= Tariff of 1791 =

United States civic duties on distilled spirits

- Other short titles: 1791 Excise Whiskey Tax; Whiskey Tax Act of 1791
- Long title: An Act repealing, after the last day of June next, the duties hereto-fore laid upon Distilled Spirits imported from abroad, and laying others in their stead; and also upon Spirits distilled within the United States, and for appropriating the same.
- Nicknames: Excise Whiskey Tax of 1791
- Enacted by: the 1st United States Congress
- Effective: March 3, 1791

Citations
- Public law: Pub. L. 1–15
- Statutes at Large: 1 Stat. 199, Chap. 15

Legislative history
- Introduced in the House as H.R. 110; Passed the House on January 27, 1791 (35-21); Passed the Senate on February 12, 1791 (20-5); Agreed to by the House on February 18, 1791 (35-21) and by the Senate on February 23, 1791 (14-9); Signed into law by President George Washington on March 3, 1791

Tariff of 1791 or Excise Whiskey Tax of 1791 was a United States statute establishing a taxation policy to further reduce Colonial America public debt as assumed by the residuals of American Revolution. The Act of Congress imposed duties or tariffs on domestic and imported distilled spirits generating government revenue while fortifying the Federalist Era.

The H.R. 110 tariff legislation originated as a panacea for the Hamiltonian economic program. The Debt Assumption policy was introduced as a series of public credit and national debt reports authored by Alexander Hamilton from 1790 to 1795.

== Opposition of Federalist Economic Plan ==
Colonial America was observant of the militia insurrection in response to the progressive debt collection and tax rulings charged by the Federalist taxation plan.

Shays' Rebellion and Whiskey Rebellion were notable uprisings where American colonists, often referred as the anti-federalists, express their sentiments concerning the public debt reconciliation plan while the newly formed government fulfilled the demands of Funding Act of 1790 during the late 18th century. The colonial protests were necessitated by the enforcement of the Federalist taxation plan as submitted by Alexander Hamilton on January 14, 1790, better known as the First Report on the Public Credit.

== See also ==
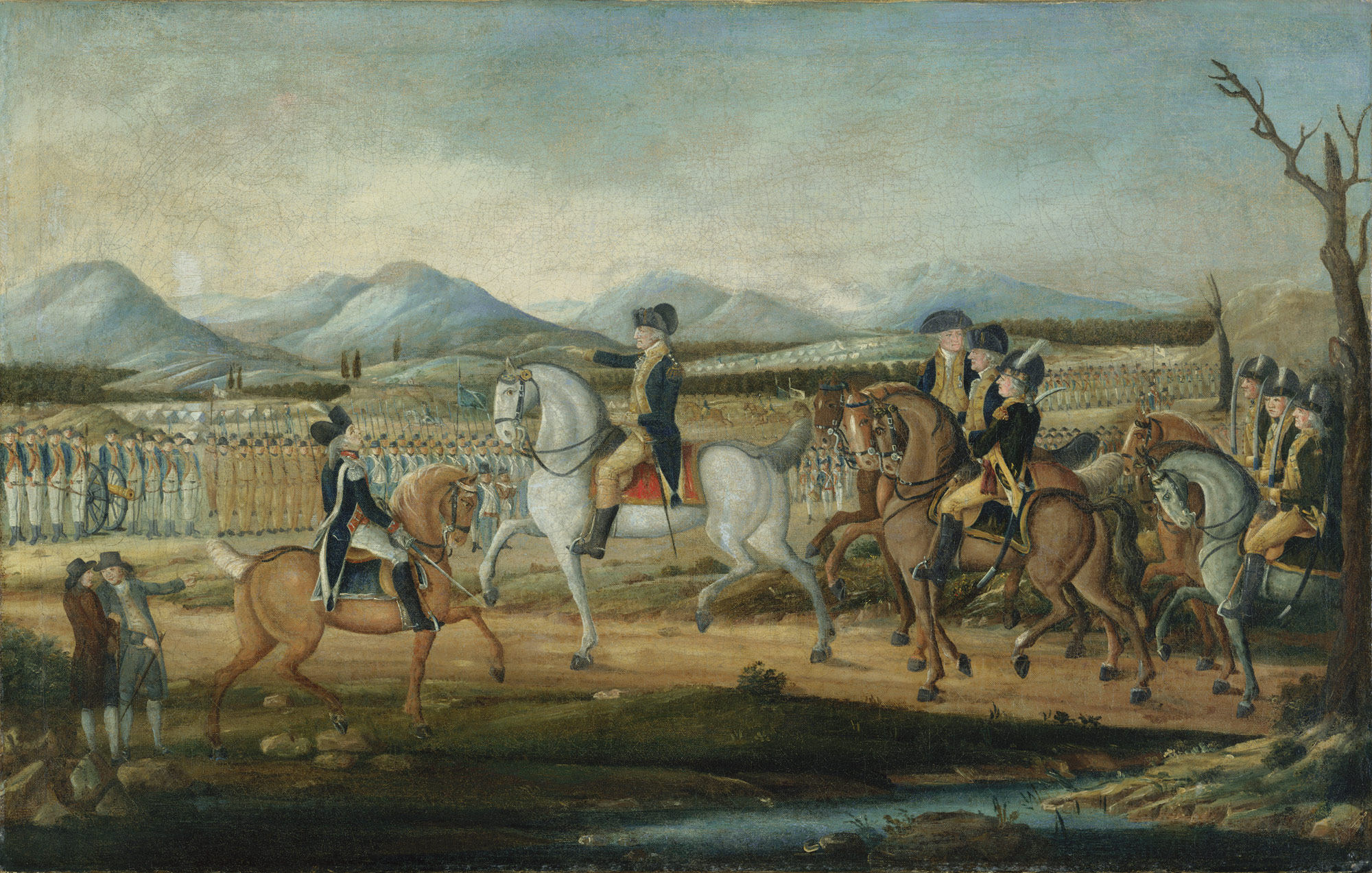
At Fort Cumberland, George Washington and troop formations to deter the Whiskey Rebellion

American Whiskey Trail	France in the American Revolutionary War
Anglo-Dutch Wars	Grievances of the United States Declaration of Independence
Bank Bill of 1791	Loyalists fighting in the American Revolution
Brick tax	No taxation without representation
Debtors' Prison Relief Act of 1792	On American Taxation
Democratic-Republican Party	Spain and the American Revolutionary War
Early American currency	Tariff in United States history
Excise tax in the United States	Taxation in medieval England
Federal Convention of 1787	The Federalist Papers
Financial costs of the American Revolutionary War	Wealth tax

Colonial and European Ambassadors, Diplomats, Financiers, Merchants, and Statesmen

William Carmichael	Gouverneur Morris
Étienne Clavière	Jacques Necker
William Duer	Joseph Nourse
Diego de Gardoqui	William Short
Henry Hope	Nicolaas van Staphorst
Jean-Joseph de Laborde	Willem Willink

== Associated Distilled Spirits Statutes ==
Chronology of 18th century colonial laws related to the duties or tariffs applied to domestic and imported distilled spirits.

U.S. Statutes Related to Funding the United States Debt

Date of Enactment	Public Law No.	U.S. Statute	U.S. Statute Chapter	U.S. Presidential Administration
August 10, 1790	Pub. L. 1–39	1 Stat. 180	Chapter XXXIX	George Washington
May 8, 1792	Pub. L. 2–32	1 Stat. 267	Chapter XXXII	George Washington
June 5, 1794	Pub. L. 3–49	1 Stat. 378	Chapter XLIX	George Washington
June 7, 1794	Pub. L. 3–53	1 Stat. 390	Chapter LIII	George Washington
June 1, 1796	Pub. L. 4–49	1 Stat. 492	Chapter XLIX	George Washington
March 3, 1797	Pub. L. 4–11	1 Stat. 504	Chapter XI	George Washington
January 29, 1798	Pub. L. 5–10	1 Stat. 539	Chapter X	John Adams
April 7, 1798	Pub. L. 5–25	1 Stat. 547	Chapter XXV	John Adams

== 18th Century Documents Related to Colonial Debt ==
- Franklin, Benjamin (September 16, 1779). "French Loan Certificate". Founders Online. U.S. National Archives and Records Administration.
- Franklin, Benjamin (February 29, 1780). "French Loan Certificate". Founders Online. U.S. National Archives and Records Administration.
- Washington, George (January 2, 1781). "Estimate on the National Debt". George Washington Papers: Series 4, General Correspondence. Washington, D.C.: The Library of Congress.
- Franklin, Benjamin (May 15, 1781). "French Loan Certificate". Founders Online. U.S. National Archives and Records Administration.
- Jefferson, Thomas (1790). "French Debt". Thomas Jefferson Papers: Series 1: General Correspondence. Washington, D.C.: The Library of Congress.
- Jefferson, Thomas (March 11, 1792). "Alexander Hamilton, March 11, 1792, Tariff, in Thomas Jefferson's Hand". Thomas Jefferson Papers: Series 1: General Correspondence. Washington, D.C.: The Library of Congress.

== Correspondence of Alexander Hamilton & George Washington ==
- Hamilton, Alexander (July 29, 1792). "To Alexander Hamilton from George Washington, 29 July 1792" [New Regulation of Allowances]. Founders Online. U.S. National Archives and Records Administration.
- Hamilton, Alexander (September 1, 1792). "To George Washington from Alexander Hamilton, 1 September 1792" [Excise Law in Western Survey of District of Pennsylvania]. Founders Online. U.S. National Archives and Records Administration.
- Hamilton, Alexander (June 15, 1793). "Enclosure Report on Obtaining New Foreign Loans, 15 June 1793". Founders Online. U.S. National Archives and Records Administration.
- Hamilton, Alexander (April 21, 1794). "To George Washington from Alexander Hamilton, 21 April 1794" [Amsterdam Commissioners Announcing the Undertaking of Loan]. Founders Online. U.S. National Archives and Records Administration.
- Hamilton, Alexander (April 25, 1794). "From Alexander Hamilton to George Washington, 25 April 1794" [Holland Loan of 1794]. Founders Online. U.S. National Archives and Records Administration.
- Hamilton, Alexander (August 5, 1794). "From Alexander Hamilton to George Washington, 5 August 1794" [Disagreeable Crisis in Western Counties of Pennsylvania]. Founders Online. U.S. National Archives and Records Administration.
- Hamilton, Alexander (September 2, 1794). "From Alexander Hamilton to George Washington, 2 September 1794" [A Spirit Hostile to Execution of the Laws]. Founders Online. U.S. National Archives and Records Administration.
- Hamilton, Alexander (January 20, 1795). "To George Washington from Alexander Hamilton, 20 January 1795" [Installment Payments of Foreign Debts]. Founders Online. U.S. National Archives and Records Administration.

== Bibliography ==
- Oldmixon, John; Moll, Herman (1708). The British Empire in America - Vol. I. Vol. I. London, G.B.: John Nicholson and Benjamin Tooke. OCLC 1041654741 – via Internet Archive.
- Oldmixon, John (1741). The British Empire in America - Vol. II. Vol. II. London, G.B.: J. Brotherton and J. Clarke. OCLC 65347255 – via Internet Archive.
- Fothergill, John (1765). Considerations Relative to the North American Colonies. London, G.B.: Henry Kent. OCLC 83457228 – via Internet Archive.
- Jenyns, Soame (1765). Objections to the Taxation of our American Colonies, by the Legislature of Great Britain, Briefly Consider'd. London, G.B.: J. Wilkie. OCLC 65351127 – via Internet Archive.
- Hopkins, Stephen (1766). The Grievances of the American Colonies Candidly Examined. London, G.B.: J. Almon, Opposite Burlington House in Picadilly. OCLC 65350684 – via Internet Archive.
- Brackenridge, Henry M. (1859). "History of the Western Insurrection in Western Pennsylvania, 1794". Internet Archive. Pittsburgh, Penn.: W.S. Haven. OCLC 1383306.
- Edler, Friedrich (1911). "The Dutch Republic and the American Revolution". Internet Archive. Baltimore, MD: The Johns Hopkins Press. OCLC 186717786.
- Perkins, James Breck (1911). "France In The American Revolution". Internet Archive. Boston, Mass.: Houghton Mifflin Company. OCLC 177577.
- Wiley, Richard T. (1912). "The Whiskey Insurrection: A General View". Internet Archive. Elizabeth, Penn.: Herald Printing Co. OCLC 9327050.
- Guthrie, William D. (1916). "America's Debt to France: The Most Unalterable Gratitude". Internet Archive. New York: American Society for the Relief of French War Orphans. OCLC 6472958.
- Penniman, James H. (1921). "I, Our Debt To France; II, What Lafayette Did For America". Internet Archive. Philadelphia, Penn.: Philadelphia. OCLC 5962930.
- Washington Lafayette Institution (1926). "Our Debt To France". Internet Archive. New York City: The Washington Lafayette Institution. OCLC 1721177.
- Miller, John C. (1960). "The Federalist Era 1789-1801". Internet Archive. New York: Harper & Brothers. OCLC 425211.
- Elkins, Stanley M.; McKitrick, Eric (1993). The Age of Federalism: The Early American Republic, 1788-1800. New York: Oxford University Press. ISBN 978-0195093810. OCLC 26720733.
- Beer, Samuel H. (1993). To Make a Nation: The Rediscovery of American Federalism. Cambridge, Mass.: Belknap Press of Harvard University Press. ISBN 978-0674893177. OCLC 25631558.

== Historical Video Archives ==
- "The Whiskey Rebellion". Internet Archive. Pathe Exchange. 1924.
- "George Washington and The Whiskey Rebellion: Testing the Constitution". Internet Archive. Learning Corporation of America. 1974.
- Whiskey Rebellion on YouTube
- The Crises of the 1790s & the Birth of American Nationalism on YouTube
- The Anti-Federalists Papers playlist on YouTube
- The Federalist Papers playlist on YouTube
- Alexander Hamilton Funds the National Debt on YouTube
- Alexander Hamilton: First Secretary of the Treasury on YouTube
- Alexander Hamilton, Shaping the New Nation on YouTube
