= American School (economics) =

Historical macroeconomic policy in the United States

The American School, also known as the National System, represents three different yet related constructs in politics, policy and philosophy. The policy existed from the 1790s to the 1970s, waxing and waning in actual degrees and details of implementation. Historian Michael Lind describes it as a coherent applied economic philosophy with logical and conceptual relationships with other economic ideas.

It is the macroeconomic philosophy that dominated United States national policies from the time of the American Civil War until the mid-20th century. Closely related to mercantilism, it can be seen as contrary to classical economics. It consisted of these three core policies:

1. Protecting industry through selective high tariffs (especially 1861–1932).
2. Government investments in infrastructure creating targeted internal improvements (especially in transportation).
3. A national bank with policies that promote the growth of productive enterprises rather than speculation.

The American School's key elements were promoted by John Quincy Adams and his National Republican Party, Henry Clay and the Whig Party and Abraham Lincoln through the early Republican Party which embraced, implemented and maintained this economic system.

== History ==
=== Origins ===
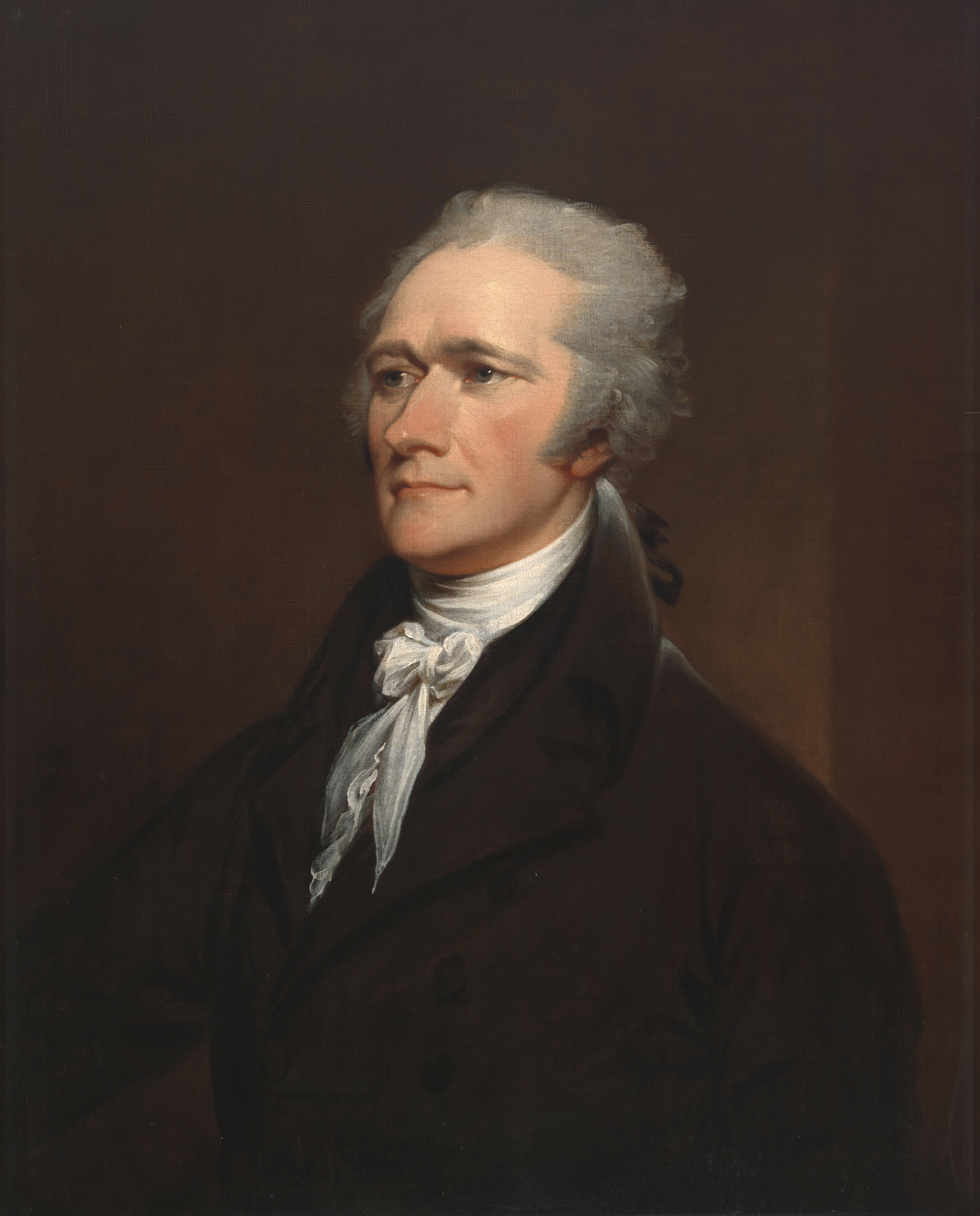
Alexander Hamilton's ideas and three Reports to Congress formed the philosophical basis of the American School.

The American School of economics represented the legacy of Alexander Hamilton, who in his Report on Manufactures, argued that the U.S. could not become fully independent until it was self-sufficient in all necessary economic products. Hamilton rooted this economic system, in part, in the successive regimes of Colbert's France and Elizabeth I's England, while rejecting the harsher aspects of mercantilism, such as seeking colonies for markets. As later defined by Senator Henry Clay who became known as the Father of the American System because of his impassioned support thereof, the American System was to unify the nation north to south, east to west, and city to farmer.

Frank Bourgin's 1989 study of the Constitutional Convention shows that direct government involvement in the economy was intended by the Founders. The goal, most forcefully articulated by Hamilton, was to ensure that dearly won political independence was not lost by being economically and financially dependent on the powers and princes of Europe. The creation of a strong central government able to promote science, invention, industry and commerce, was seen as an essential means of promoting the general welfare and making the economy of the United States strong enough for them to determine their own destiny.

Jefferson and Madison strongly opposed Hamilton's program, but were forced to implement it by the exigencies of the embargo, begun in December 1807 under the Non-Intercourse Act, and the War of 1812 against Britain.

A number of programs by the federal government undertaken in the period prior to the Civil War gave shape and substance to the American School. These programs included the establishment of the Patent Office in 1802, the creation of the Survey of the Coast (later renamed the United States Coast Survey and then the United States Coast and Geodetic Survey) in 1807 and other measures to improve river and harbor navigation created by the 1824 Rivers and Harbors Act.

Other developments included the various Army expeditions to the west, beginning with Lewis and Clark's Corps of Discovery in 1804 and continuing into the 1870s (see for example, the careers of Major Stephen Harriman Long and Major General John C. Frémont), almost always under the direction of an officer from the Army Corps of Topographical Engineers, and which provided crucial information for the overland pioneers that followed (see, for example, the career of Brigadier General Randolph B. Marcy), the assignment of Army Engineer officers to assist or direct the surveying and construction of the early railroads and canals, and the establishment of the First Bank of the United States and Second Bank of the United States as well as various protectionist measures such as the Tariff of 1828.

Leading proponents were economists Friedrich List (1789–1846) and Henry Carey (1793–1879). List was a leading 19th Century German and American economist who called it the "National System" and developed it further in his book The National System of Political Economy Carey called this a Harmony of Interests in his book by the same name, a harmony between labor and management, and as well a harmony between agriculture, manufacturing, and merchants.

The name "American System" was coined by Clay to distinguish it, as a school of thought, from the competing theory of economics at the time, the "British System" represented by Adam Smith in his work Wealth of Nations.

=== Central policies ===
The American School included three cardinal policy points:

1. Support industry: the advocacy of protectionism, and opposition to free trade – particularly for the protection of "infant industries" and those facing import competition from abroad. Examples: Tariff Act of 1789, Tariff Act of 1816 and Morrill Tariff.
2. Create physical infrastructure: government finance of internal improvements to speed commerce and develop industry. This involved the regulation of privately held infrastructure, to ensure that it meets the nation's needs. Examples: Cumberland Road and Union Pacific Railroad.
3. Create financial infrastructure: a government sponsored National Bank to issue currency and encourage commerce. This involved the use of sovereign powers for the regulation of credit to encourage the development of the economy, and to deter speculation. Examples: First Bank of the United States, Second Bank of the United States, and National Banking Act.

Henry C. Carey, a leading American economist and adviser to Abraham Lincoln, in his book Harmony of Interests, displays two additional points of this American School economic philosophy that distinguishes it from the systems of Adam Smith or Karl Marx:

1. Government support for the development of science and public education through a public 'common' school system and investments in creative research through grants and subsidies.
2. Rejection of class struggle, in favor of the "Harmony of Interests" between: owners and workers, farmers and manufacturers, the wealthy class and the working class.

In a passage from his book, The Harmony of Interests, Carey wrote concerning the difference between the American System and British System of economics:

Two systems are before the world; ... One looks to increasing the necessity for commerce; the other to increasing the power to maintain it. One looks to underworking the Hindoo [sic], and sinking the rest of the world to his level; the other to raising the standard of man throughout the world to our level. One looks to pauperism, ignorance, depopulation, and barbarism; the other to increasing wealth, comfort, intelligence, combination of action, and civilization. One looks towards universal war; the other towards universal peace. One is the English system; the other we may be proud to call the American system, for it is the only one ever devised the tendency of which was that of elevating while equalizing the condition of man throughout the world.

In the Civil War, a shortage of specie led to the issue of such a fiat currency, called United States Notes, or "greenbacks". Towards the end of the Civil War in March 1865, Henry C. Carey, Lincoln's economic advisor, published a series of letters to the Speaker of the House entitled "The Way to Outdo England Without Fighting Her." Carey called for the continuance of the greenback policy even after the War, while also raising the reserve requirements of the banks to 50%. This would have allowed the US to develop its economy independent of foreign capital (primarily British gold). Carey wrote:

The most serious move in the retrograde direction is that one we find in the determination to prohibit the further issue of [United States Notes] ... To what have we been indebted for [the increased economic activity]? To protection and the " greenbacks"! What is it that we are now laboring to destroy? Protection and the Greenback! Let us continue on in the direction in which we now are moving, and we shall see ... not a re-establishment of the Union, but a complete and final disruption of it.

Carey's plans did not come to fruition as Lincoln was assassinated the next month and new President Andrew Johnson supported the gold standard, and by 1879 the U.S. was fully back on the gold standard.

=== Advocacy ===
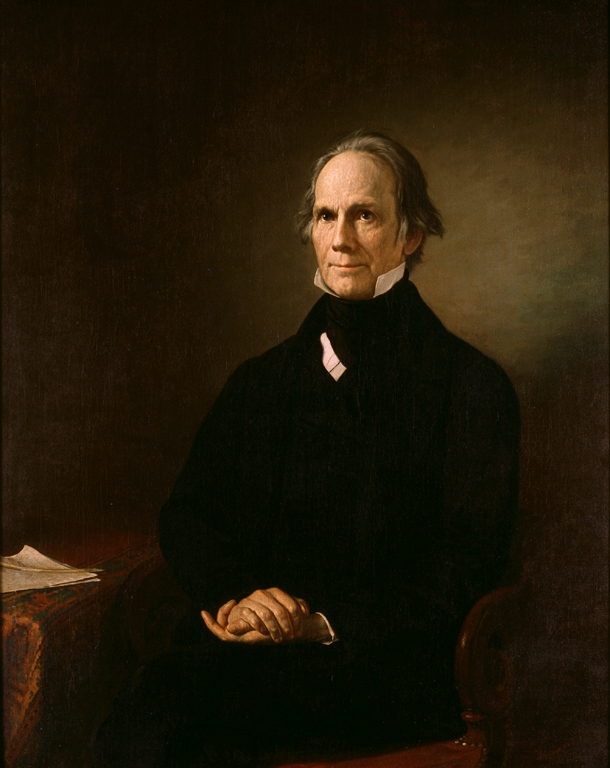
U.S. Senator Henry Clay, leader of the Whig Party and advocate for the American System

The "American System" was the name given by Henry Clay in a speech before Congress advocating an economic program based on the economic philosophy derived from Alexander Hamilton's economic theories. Clay's policies called for a high tariff to support internal improvements such as road-building, and a national bank to encourage productive enterprise and to form a national currency as Hamilton had advocated as Secretary of the Treasury.

Clay first used the term "American System" in 1824, although he had been working for its specifics for many years previously. Portions of the American System were enacted by Congress. The Second Bank of the United States was rechartered in 1816 for 20 years. High tariffs were maintained from the days of Hamilton until 1832. However, the national system of internal improvements was never adequately funded; the failure to do so was due in part to sectional jealousies and constitutional scruples about such expenditures.

Clay's plan became the leading tenet of the National Republican Party of John Quincy Adams and the Whig Party of himself and Daniel Webster.

The "American System" was supported by New England and the Mid-Atlantic, which had a large manufacturing base. It protected their new factories from foreign competition.

The South opposed the "American System" because its plantation owners were heavily reliant on production of cotton for export, and the American System produced lower demand for their cotton and created higher costs for manufactured goods. After 1828 the United States kept tariffs low until the election of Abraham Lincoln in 1861.

=== Executive opposition to the American System by the Jacksonians ===
Opposition to the economic nationalism embodied by Henry Clay's American System came primarily from the Democratic Party of Andrew Jackson, Martin van Buren, and James K. Polk. These three presidents styled themselves as the peoples' politicians, seeking to protect both the agrarian frontier culture and the strength of the Union. Jackson in particular, the founder of the movement, held an unflinching commitment to what he viewed as the sanctity of the majority opinion. In his first annual message to Congress, Jackson proclaimed that "the first principle of our system [is] that the majority govern". This ideology governed Jackson's actions throughout his presidency, and heavily influenced his protégé Martin van Buren as well as the final Jacksonian president, James K. Polk.

This commitment to the majority and to the voiceless came in direct conflict with many elements of the American System. The Jacksonian presidents saw key tenets of the American System, including the support for the Second Bank of the United States and advocacy of protectionist tariffs, as serving moneyed or special interests rather than the majority of Americans. The Jacksonians opposed other elements of Clay's ideology, including support for internal infrastructural improvements, on the grounds that they represented governmental overstretch as well. Several key events, legislative conflicts, and presidential vetoes shaped the substantive opposition to the American System.

==== Second Bank of the United States and the Bank War ====
The first and most well-known battle between Jacksonians and Clay focused on the struggle over renewing the charter of the Second Bank of the United States. In Andrew Jackson's first annual message to Congress in 1829, he declared that "[b]oth the constitutionality and the expediency of the law creating this bank are well questioned by a large portion of our fellow-citizens, and it must be admitted by all that it has failed in the great end of establishing a uniform and sound currency". He further attacked the proponents of renewing the bank's charter, scathingly referring to the "stockholders" seeking a renewal of their "privileges".

This rhetoric, portraying the supporters of the bank as privileged individuals, and claiming the opposition of "a large portion of our fellow-citizens" crystallizes Jackson's majoritarian distaste for the special interest serving economic nationalism embodied in the American System. Jackson's Secretary of the Treasury Roger B. Taney effectively summed up Jackson's opposition to the Second Bank of the United States: ""It is a fixed principle of our political institutions to guard against the unnecessary accumulation of power over persons and property in any hands. And no hands are less worthy to be trusted with it than those of a moneyed corporation".

The two sides of the debate became even more starkly defined as a result of the actions of Second Bank President Nicholas Biddle and Henry Clay himself. Upon hearing of Jackson's distaste for his bank, Biddle immediately set about opening new branches of the bank in key political districts in hopes of manipulating Congressional opinion. Although this action indeed helped acquire the votes necessary to pass the bill in Congress, it enraged Jackson. Jackson saw this manipulation as clear evidence of the penchant of a national bank to serve private, non-majoritarian interests.

Henry Clay's American System supported the necessity for central institutions to "take an activist role in shaping and advancing the nation's economic development". The bank thus fit well into Clay's worldview, and he took advantage of Biddle's manipulation in order to pass the renewal bill through Congress, despite expecting Jackson's inevitable veto. Clay hoped that when Jackson vetoed the bill, it would more clearly differentiate the two sides of the debate which Clay then sought to use to his advantage in running for president. With battle lines set, Jackson's majoritarian opposition to the Second Bank of the United States helped him be elected to a second term.

==== Tariff question ====
The question of protective tariffs championed by the American System proved one of the trickiest for Jacksonian presidents. Tariffs disproportionately benefited the industrial interests of the North while causing injury to the import-dependent agrarian South and West. As a result, the issue proved extremely divisive to the nation's unity, something Jacksonian presidents sought to protect at all costs. The Jacksonian presidents, particularly the southern-born Jackson, had to be extremely cautious when lowering tariffs in order to maintain their support in the North.

However, the tariffs indeed represented an economic nationalism that primarily benefited the Northern States, while increasing the cost of European imports in the South. This ran strongly contrary to Jacksonian ideals. In the end, despite Northern objections, both President Jackson and President Polk lowered tariffs. Jackson reformed the Tariff of 1828 (also known as the Tariff of Abominations) by radically reducing rates in the Tariff of 1832. This helped stave off the Southern nullification crisis, in which Southern states refused to enact the tariff, and threatened secession if faced with governmental coercion.

The bill that reduced the Tariff of 1828 was co-authored by Henry Clay in a desperate attempt to maintain national unity. Polk, on the other hand, in his characteristically efficient way, managed to push through significant tariff reductions in the first 18 months of his term.

==== Opposition to government-financed internal improvements ====
The final bastion of Jacksonian opposition to Clay's American System existed in relation to the use of government funds to conduct internal improvements. The Jacksonian presidents feared that government funding of such projects as roads and canals exceeded the mandate of the federal government and should not be undertaken. Van Buren believed very strongly that "[t]he central government, unlike the states", had no obligation to provide relief or promote the general welfare.

This stance kept faith with the tenets of Jeffersonian republicanism, notably its agrarianism and strict constructionism, to which van Buren was heir". As heir to the legacy of Van Buren and Jackson, Polk was similarly hostile to internal improvement programs, and used his presidential veto to prevent such projects from reaching fruition.

=== Implementation ===
An extra session of congress was called in the summer of 1841 for a restoration of the American system. When the tariff question came up again in 1842, the compromise of 1833 was overthrown, and the protective system placed in the ascendant.

Due to the dominance of the then Democratic Party of Van Buren, Polk, and Buchanan the American School was not embraced as the economic philosophy of the United States until the election of Abraham Lincoln in 1860, who, with a series of laws during the American Civil War, was able to fully implement what Hamilton, Clay, List, and Carey theorized, wrote about, and advocated.

Abraham Lincoln, an "Old Henry Clay tariff Whig" by his own definition, enacted much of the American School's core policies into law during his tenure as President from 1861 through 1865.

As soon as Lincoln took office, the old Whig coalition finally controlled the entire government. It immediately tripled the average tariff, began to subsidize the construction of a transcontinental railroad in California even though a desperate war was being waged, and on February 25, 1862, the Legal Tender Act empowered the secretary of the treasury to issue paper money ('greenbacks') that were not immediately redeemable in gold or silver.

The United States continued these policies throughout the later half of the 19th century.

President Ulysses S Grant acknowledged the perceived efficacy of tariff protection in reference to Britain's success during the Industrial Revolution, when tariff rates on manufactures peaked at 57%:

For centuries England has relied on protection, has carried it to extremes and has obtained satisfactory results from it. There is no doubt that it is to this system that it owes its present strength.

President William McKinley (1897–1901) stated at the time:

[They say] if you had not had the Protective Tariff things would be a little cheaper. Well, whether a thing is cheap or dear depends upon what we can earn by our daily labor. Free trade cheapens the product by cheapening the producer. Protection cheapens the product by elevating the producer. Under free trade the trader is the master and the producer the slave. Protection is but the law of nature, the law of self-preservation, of self-development, of securing the highest and best destiny of the race of man. [It is said] that protection is immoral ... Why, if protection builds up and elevates 63,000,000 [the U.S. population] of people, the influence of those 63,000,000 of people elevates the rest of the world. We cannot take a step in the pathway of progress without benefitting mankind everywhere. Well, they say, 'Buy where you can buy the cheapest'...Of course, that applies to labor as to everything else. Let me give you a maxim that is a thousand times better than that, and it is the protection maxim: 'Buy where you can pay the easiest.' And that spot of earth is where labor wins its highest rewards.

The American System was important in the election politics for and against Grover Cleveland, the first Democrat elected after the Civil War, who, by reducing tariffs protecting American industries in 1893, began rolling back federal involvement in economic affairs, a process that became dominant by the 1920s and continued until Herbert Hoover's attempts to deal with the worsening Great Depression.

=== Evolution ===
As the United States entered the 20th century, the American School was the policy of the United States under such names as American Policy, economic nationalism, National System, Protective System, Protection Policy, and protectionism, which alludes only to the tariff policy of this system of economics.

This continued until 1913 when the administration of Woodrow Wilson initiated his The New Freedom policy that replaced the National Bank System with the Federal Reserve System, and lowered tariffs to revenue-only levels with the Underwood Tariff.

The election of Warren G. Harding and the Republican Party in 1920 represented a partial return to the American School through restoration of high tariffs. A subsequent further return was enacted as President Herbert Hoover responded to the 1929 crash and the subsequent bank failures and unemployment by signing the Smoot-Hawley Tariff Act, which some economists considered to have deepened the Great Depression, while others disagree.

The New Deal continued infrastructure improvements through the numerous public works projects of the Works Progress Administration (WPA) as well as the creation of the Tennessee Valley Authority (TVA); brought massive reform to the banking system of the Federal Reserve while investing in various ways in industry to stimulate production and control speculation; but abandoned protective tariffs while embracing moderate tariff protection (revenue based 20–30% the normal tariff under this) through reciprocity, choosing to subsidize industry as a replacement. At the close of World War II, the United States now dominant in manufacturing with little competition, the era of free trade had begun.

In 1973, when the "Kennedy" Round concluded under President Richard Nixon, who cut U.S. tariffs to all time lows, the New Deal orientation towards reciprocity and subsidy ended, which moved the United States further in the free market direction, and away from its American School economic system.

== Other nations ==
Friedrich List's influence among developing nations has been considerable. Japan has followed his model. It has also been argued that Deng Xiaoping's post-Mao policies were inspired by List as well as recent policies in India.

== See also ==
- American System (economic plan)
- Protectionism in the United States
- Henry Charles Carey
- Anders Chydenius
- Daniel Raymond
- Friedrich List
- Economic history of the United States
- Import substitution industrialization, a key feature of the American System adopted in much of the Third World during the 20th century
- Johann Heinrich von Thünen
- Lincoln's expansion of the federal government's economic role
- National Policy, a similar economic plan used by Canada circa 1867–1920s
- William Petty
- Report on Manufactures
- First Report on the Public Credit
- Second Report on Public Credit
- Report on a Plan for the Further Support of Public Credit

General:

- History of economic thought
- Economic nationalism
- Eden Agreement
- Historical school of economics
