= Madisonian Economic Model =

Debt repayment plan proposed by James Madison

The Madisonian Economic Model was James Madison's plan for the repayment of domestic debts after the American Revolution. It was referred to by Madison as "discrimination" and was proposed in opposition to Hamilton's First Report on the Public Credit.

Besides placing an unfair burden of taxation on southern states (who had paid off their state debt), Madison feared the assumption plan cheated domestic creditors. After the American Revolution, veterans were granted securities as a promise to repay debt that the nation owed them. The nation was now ready to pay off this debt, and was willing to pay at par. Many original security holders, however, had sold their securities to speculators at a fraction of their worth. Madison thus proposed a plan that would honor the original holders' justice and the speculators' contracts.

"One of three things must be done; either pay both (the original holders and the speculators), reject wholly one or the other, or make a composition between them on some principle of equity."

The Madisonian model favored this equity, but was rejected in favor of Hamilton's assumption plan.
