= American System (economic plan) =

Protectionist economic policies of the early 19th-century United States

The American System was an economic plan that played an important role in American policy during the first half of the 19th century, rooted in the "American School" ideas and of the Hamiltonian economic program of Alexander Hamilton.

A plan to strengthen and unify the nation, the American System was advanced by the Whig Party and a number of leading politicians including Henry Clay and John Quincy Adams. Clay was the first to refer to it as the "American System". Motivated by a growing American economy bolstered with major exports such as cotton, tobacco, native sod, and tar, the politicians sought to create a structure for expanding trade. This System included such policies as:

- Support for a high tariff to protect American industries and generate revenue for the federal government
- Maintenance of high public land prices to generate federal revenue
- Preservation of the Bank of the United States to stabilize the currency and rein in risky state and local banks
- Development of a system of internal improvements (such as roads and canals) which would knit the nation together and be financed by the tariff and land sales.

Clay protested that the West, which opposed the tariff, should support it since urban factory workers would be consumers of western foods. In Clay's view, the South (which also opposed high tariffs) should support them because of the ready market for cotton in northern mills. This last argument was the weak link. The South never strongly supported the American System and had access to plenty of foreign markets for its cotton exports.

Portions of the American System were enacted by the United States Congress. The Second Bank of the United States was rechartered in 1816 for 20 years. High tariffs were first suggested by Alexander Hamilton in his 1791 Report on Manufactures but were not approved by Congress until the Tariff of 1816. Tariffs were subsequently raised until they peaked in 1828 after the so-called Tariff of Abominations. After the Nullification Crisis in 1833, tariffs remained the same rate until the Civil War. However, the national system of internal improvements was never adequately funded; the failure to do so was due in part to sectional jealousies and constitutional squabbles about such expenditures.

In 1830, President Andrew Jackson rejected a bill which would allow the federal government to purchase stock in the Maysville, Washington, Paris, and Lexington Turnpike Road Company, which had been organized to construct a road linking Lexington and the Ohio River, the entirety of which would be in the state of Kentucky. Jackson's Maysville Road veto was due to both his personal conflict with Clay and his ideological objections.

== Main points ==
The establishment of a protective tariff, a 20%–25% tax on imported goods, would protect a nation's business from foreign competition. Congress passed a tariff in 1816 which made European goods more expensive and encouraged consumers to buy relatively cheap American-made goods.

The establishment of a national bank would promote a single currency, making trade easier, and issue what was called sovereign credit, i.e., credit issued by the national government, rather than borrowed from the private banking system. In 1816, Congress created the Second Bank of the United States.

The improvement of the country's infrastructure, especially transportation systems, made trade easier and faster for everyone. Poor roads made transportation slow and costly.

The American System became the leading tenet of the Whig Party of Henry Clay and Daniel Webster. It was opposed by the Democratic Party of Andrew Jackson, Martin Van Buren, James K. Polk, Franklin Pierce, and James Buchanan prior to the Civil War, often on the grounds that the points of it were unconstitutional.

Among the most important internal improvements created under the American System was the Cumberland Road:

Henry Clay's "American System," devised in the burst of nationalism that followed the War of 1812, remains one of the most historically significant examples of a government-sponsored program to harmonize and balance the nation's agriculture, commerce, and industry. This "System" consisted of three mutually reinforcing parts: a tariff to protect and promote American industry; a national bank to foster commerce; and federal subsidies for roads, canals, and other "internal improvements" to develop profitable markets for agriculture. Funds for these subsidies would be obtained from tariffs and sales of public lands. Clay argued that a vigorously maintained system of sectional economic interdependence would eliminate the chance of renewed subservience to the free-trade, laissez-faire "British System."

— United States Senate website

== Reception and debate ==
=== Jacksonian opposition ===
Historians note that Jacksonian Democrats opposed Clay’s program as a centralizing scheme that privileged chartered corporations and national coordination over local control. Contemporary documents frame the dispute: in the Maysville Road veto of May 27, 1830, Jackson argued that Congress lacked authority to fund a purely intrastate project and warned that approving such bills would “sanction … unlimited power over the subject of internal improvements.” In the Bank Veto of July 10, 1832, he denounced the Second Bank’s charter for conferring “privileges” and fostering an “interest separate from that of the people,” while defending the Executive’s independent constitutional judgment.

Legal-historical scholarship interprets this stance as rooted in a populist-republican distrust of monopoly and elite coordination, coupled with a preference for politically accountable (rather than technocratically insulated) administration. Jerry L. Mashaw argues that Jacksonian ideology emphasized a “small and frugal federal government,” and that administrative accountability was “preeminently a matter of … political oversight,” even as Bank War policies required new capacities within the Treasury. Clay’s own description of the American System—as a tariff, national bank, and federal support for internal improvements intended to “harmonize and balance” the nation through “sectional economic interdependence”—is frequently cited as evidence of its national-coordination aims; Jacksonians disputed that harmonizing vision on constitutional and political-economy grounds.

==== Themes in the Jacksonian critique ====
Contemporary Jacksonian documents and later scholarship frame the opposition to Clay’s program around concerns about centralization and elite coordination. Jackson’s Maysville Road veto (1830) rejected federal funding of intrastate internal improvements on constitutional grounds and warned that such appropriations would “sanction … unlimited power over the subject of internal improvements.” In the Bank Veto (1832), Jackson argued that the Bank charter conferred “privileges” and fostered an interest “separate from that of the people,” positioning the issue as one of concentrated power and political accountability.

Clay’s own description of the American System emphasized a tariff, a national bank, and federal support for internal improvements intended to “harmonize and balance” agriculture, commerce, and industry through “sectional economic interdependence.” Historians of the period note that this harmonizing vision aimed to knit regions into an integrated national market under federal auspices, a goal that Jacksonian Democrats criticized as privileging chartered corporations and national coordination over local decision-making. Legal-historical work likewise interprets Jacksonian administrative thought as favoring politically accountable (rather than technocratically insulated) governance and expressing distrust of monopoly and elite coordination.

Within this framework, critics argued that a nationally coordinated scheme could concentrate decision-making authority, limit local diversification, and create long-term dependencies; by contrast, they favored dispersed authority and locally embedded institutions (municipal boards, courts, associations, and state-chartered entities) as checks on concentration and as instruments of development.

== Interpretations and later scholarship ==
Some later scholarship examines U.S. economic development through the lens of centralized coordination among firms and sectors, and discusses how such coordination scaled from regional to national and international levels in the twentieth century. Economist John R. Munkirs argues that large U.S. enterprises developed networks of board interlocks, equity and debt ties, and other “planning instruments” that produced technological, financial, and administrative interdependence both within and across industries; he terms the overall pattern “centralized private sector planning.” In this account, interindustry interdependence sustains coordinated decision-making and long-range planning at regional, national, and international scales.

Munkirs also discusses the globalization of production and governance inside large firms, outlining a progression of organizational forms—international, multinational, transnational, supranational, and what he calls the “anational corporation”—to describe corporate structures whose operations and planning can extend beyond the effective control of any single state. Proponents in this literature emphasize cross-border production efficiencies and integrated supply chains, while critics raise questions about democratic accountability and concentrated private power at scale.

Although this literature addresses later periods, editors and scholars sometimes juxtapose those twentieth-century coordination debates with earlier U.S. efforts that sought to “harmonize and balance” sectors and to build integrated national markets, in order to compare different models of coordination (public-led, private-led, or mixed). Interpretations differ on how far such analogies can be taken and whether they illuminate, or depart from, the early-nineteenth-century program commonly associated with Henry Clay’s proposed “American System.”

== Annual message of 1815 (Six Points) ==
- Funds for national defense
- Frigates for the Navy
- A standing army and federal control of the militia
- Federal aid for building roads and canals
- A protective tariff to encourage manufacturers
- Re-establishing the National Bank
- Federal assumption of some state debt

== See also ==
- American School (economics)
- Economic nationalism
- Protectionism
- Tariffs
- Tariffs in United States history
- Protectionism in the United States
- Friedrich List, German-American economist
- Import substitution industrialization, a key feature of the American System adopted in much of the Third World during the twentieth century
- Lincoln's expansion of the federal government's economic role
- National Policy, a similar economic plan used by Canada circa 1867–1920s
- Australian settlement
