= Report on Manufactures =

1791 report on economic policy by U.S. Treasury Secretary Alexander Hamilton

Portrait of Alexander Hamilton, John Trumbull, 1792

In United States history, the Report on the Subject of Manufactures, generally referred to by its shortened title Report on Manufactures, is the third of four major reports, and magnum opus, of American Founding Father and first U.S. Treasury Secretary Alexander Hamilton. It was presented to the Congress on December 5, 1791. In the report, Hamilton argued for industrial policy to support modern manufacturing technologies in the United States.

It laid forth economic principles rooted in both the mercantilist system of Elizabeth I's England and the practices of Jean-Baptiste Colbert of France. The main ideas of the Report would later be incorporated into the "American System" program by US Senator Henry Clay of Kentucky and his Whig Party. Abraham Lincoln, who called himself a "Henry Clay tariff Whig" during his early years, would later make the principles cornerstones, together with his opposition to the institution and the expansion of slavery, of the fledgling Republican Party.

Hamilton's ideas would form the basis for the American School of economics.

== Economic plan ==
Hamilton reasoned that to secure American independence, the United States needed to have a sound policy of encouraging the growth of manufacturing and ensure its future as a permanent feature of the economic system of the nation. He argued these could be achieved by bounties or subsidies to industry, regulation of trade with moderate tariffs (which were intended not to discourage imports but to raise revenue to support American manufacturing by subsidies), and other government encouragement. These policies would not only promote the growth of manufacturing but also provide diversified employment opportunities and promote immigration to the young United States. They would also expand the applications of technology and science for all quarters of the economy, including agriculture. In his report, Hamilton advocated rewarding those bringing "improvements and secrets of extraordinary value" to the United States. That contributed to making the United States a haven for industrial spies.

=== Tariffs ===
Hamilton reasoned that tariffs issued in moderation would raise revenue to fund the nation. The tariff could also be used to encourage domestic or national manufacturing and growth of the economy by applying the funds raised in part towards subsidies, then called bounties, to manufacturers. Hamilton sought to use the tariff for the following:

- Protect domestic infant industries until they could achieve economies of scale and be able to compete with more established firms abroad.
- Raise revenue to pay the expenses of government.
- Raise revenue to directly support manufacturing through bounties (subsidies).

=== Industrial subsidies ===
Hamilton reasoned that bounties (subsidies) to industry, which would rely on funds raised by moderate tariffs, would be the best means of growing manufacturing without decreasing the supply or increasing the prices of goods. Such encouragement by direct support would make American enterprise competitive and independent along with the nation as a whole. In part subsidies would be used for the following:

- Encourage the nation's spirit of enterprise, innovation, and invention.
- Support internal improvements, including roads and canals to increase and to encourage domestic commerce.
- Grow the infant nation to a manufacturing power that would be independent of control by foreign powers by relying on their goods for domestic, especially defense supplies.

== Adoption by Congress ==
Though Congress refused to accept Hamilton's proposals in 1791 because of opposition from Madison and his supporters, much of Hamilton's third report would later be adopted by the US Congress despite continued opposition to the support of industry by subsidies. Both sides agreed that manufacturing independence was desirable and necessary but disagreed on how to obtain it. The Jeffersonian Democratic-Republican Party's main objection to subsidy was their fear that subsidy would lead to corruption and favoritism of certain sections of the new nation over others: the north over the agrarian south. That divide would return again and again in issues of economic policy until the outbreak of the American Civil War.

It is often thought that Hamilton's report was completely ignored, but "Hamilton worked to ensure that Congress enacted virtually every tariff recommendation in the report within five months of its delivery."

Hamilton's revenue-based trade policy, with its more moderate tariffs, meant that by 1794, manufacturers had switched their support from the Federalists to the Democratic-Republicans, who favored higher, more protectionist tariffs.

== Opposition ==
Leading opponents of Alexander Hamilton's economic plan included Thomas Jefferson (until later years) and James Madison, who were opposed to the use of subsidy to industry, along with most of their fledgling Democratic-Republican Party. Instead of bounties they reasoned in favor of high tariffs and restrictions on imports to increase manufacturing, which was favored by the manufacturers themselves, who desired protection of their home market. Although the Jeffersonian stance originally favored an "agrarian" economy of farmers, it changed over time to encompass many of Hamilton's original ideas: Also, "the Madison administration helped give rise to the first truly protectionist tariff in U.S. history."

== Evaluation by modern historians ==
According to economic historian Douglas Irwin Alexander Hamilton’s protectionist reputation is often overstated. While Hamilton is commonly associated with high tariffs, Irwin notes that the report is “much more nuanced than is commonly portrayed.” Although Hamilton supported the promotion of domestic manufacturing at a time when the United States had little industrial development, he favored “subsidies and encouragements to invest rather than high tariffs” and believed that tariffs were not particularly effective in fostering industrial growth. According to Irwin, Hamilton aimed to support manufacturing without necessarily shielding it from foreign competition, recognizing that excessive protection could lead to inefficiency and reduce overall trade. Irwin emphasizes the importance of historical context, pointing out that the United States had just emerged from war with Britain and was still predominantly an agricultural society with very different conditions than in later centuries.

== See also ==
- First Report on the Public Credit – Hamilton's report on public finance
- Second Report on Public Credit – Hamilton's report on national banking
- Federalist Party – Hamilton's political party
- Political economy – overview of economic theory research
- Free trade economics – opposing school of thought
- Report on a Plan for the Further Support of Public Credit – Hamilton's report on dealing with public credit after his resignation

== Sources ==
- Irwin, Douglas A. (2004). "The Aftermath of Hamilton's 'Report on Manufactures'" (PDF). The Journal of Economic History. 64 (3): 800–821. doi:10.1017/s0022050704002979. JSTOR 3874820. S2CID 154744569.
- Nelson, John R. (1979). "Alexander Hamilton and American Manufacturing: A Reexamination". The Journal of American History. 65 (4): 971–995. doi:10.2307/1894556. JSTOR 1894556.
