= Bank Bill of 1791 =

- Long title: An Act to incorporate the subscribers to the Bank of the United States.
- Enacted by: the 1st United States Congress
- Effective: February 25, 1791

Citations
- Public law: Pub. L. 1–10, Session III
- Statutes at Large: 1 Stat. 191, Chap. 10

Legislative history
- Introduced in the Senate as S. 17; Passed the House on February 8, 1791 (39-20); Signed into law by President George Washington on February 25, 1791

The Bank Bill of 1791 is a common term for two bills passed by the First Congress of the United States of America on February 25 and March 2 of 1791.

== Background ==
After Alexander Hamilton became Secretary of the Treasury in 1790, he promoted the expansion of the federal government through a variety of controversial bills. Hamilton argued that a federal bank would be beneficial to the national economy. The opening paragraph of the bill sums up his arguments:

Whereas it is conceived that the establishment of a bank for the United States, upon a foundation sufficiently extensive to answer the purposes intended thereby, and at the same time upon the principles which afford adequate security for an upright and prudent administration thereof, will be very conducive to the successful conducting of the national finance; will tend to give facility to the obtaining of loans, for the use of the government, in sudden emergencies; and will be productive of considerable advantages to trade and industry in general:

== Rights and restrictions ==
This bill grants that a "bank of the United States" shall be granted limited legal rights in order to manage the national finance, to obtain loans for the federal government in case of sudden emergencies, and to promote trade and industry. The bank was granted the following legal rights and restrictions:

=== Bank stock ===
The corporation was granted the right to issue paper stock under the following restrictions:

- The corporation was granted the legal right to sell a maximum of 25,000 shares of stocks at $400 each for a total of $10,000,000, beginning April 1, 1791. Any individual, partnership or body politic could purchase up to 1,000 shares.
- The corporation was granted the legal right to accept payment for these shares at the fixed ratio of two currencies: $1 in gold or silver for every $3 in federal debt bonds, which were issued under the Funding Act of 1790 and bore interest at an annual rate of 6%.
- The corporation was required to pay dividends to shareholders at $9 per share every six months, the nominal equivalent of 6% annual interest on the $300 in debt bonds that shareholders initially used to purchase the bank stock. These dividends would be paid at a fixed ratio of two currencies: $1 in gold or silver for every $3 in debt bonds.

=== Corporate personhood ===
The shareholders of the bank were granted the legal right of corporate personhood and the corporation was granted several rights:

- Shareholders were granted the legal right to form a corporation, "The President, Directors and Company, of the Bank of the United States", with its own legal seal, continuing until March 4, 1811.
- The corporation was granted the legal rights of corporate person: "to sue and be sued, plead and be impleaded, answer and be answered, defend and be defended, in courts of record, and any other place whatsoever."
- The corporation was granted the right to buy "lands, rents, tenements, hereditaments, goods, chattels, and effects of what kind, nature or quality soever" and to "sell, grant, demise, aliene, or dispose of" the commodities above.
- The corporation may only hold lands, tenements and hereditaments "requisite for its immediate accommodation in relation to the convenient transacting of" the corporation's business.
- The corporation was granted the right of monopoly in that no other bank would be established by the federal government during its continuance.

=== Self-governance ===
The corporation would be self-governed according to the following organizational structure:

- Shares would initially be sold under the supervision of "not less than three" superintendents, appointed by the president of the United States.
- Whenever the corporation would obtained $400,000 in gold and silver from shareholders, the corporation would be required to elect 25 shareholders as directors of the bank and then reelect 25 directors each January 1.
- Shareholders cast votes in proportion to the number of shares that they hold. Only shareholders, citizens of the United States, are eligible as directors. The directors choose one of themselves as president after each election.
- 7 directors constitute a quorum.
- Any group of at least 60 people in possession of at least 200 shares can call a general meeting.
- The directors are personally responsible for any debts beyond the allowed limit without exempting the corporation's holdings from legal confiscation. However, absentee or dissenting directors may excuse themselves from liability.

=== Accounting ===
- The nominal value of the corporation's commodities was capped at $15,000,000 including the $2,500,000 of gold and silver, and the $7,500,000 in debt bonds potentially obtained through the sale of stocks (see above).
- The total debt of the corporation was capped at $10,000,000 beyond any monies deposited at the bank.
- The corporation was granted the right to sell the debt bonds obtained through the sale of stock, but was prohibited from buying debt bonds.
- The corporation was prohibited from charging more than 6% on loans or discounts.
- The corporation was prohibited from trading anything except "bills of exchange, gold and silver boullion, or in the sale of goods really and truly pledged for money lent and not redeemed in due time; or of goods which shall be the produce of its lands."
- The corporation was granted the right to lend up to $100,000 to the federal government and up to $50,000 to any individual state.
- The corporation was prohibited from making loans to any foreign prince or state without legal authorization from the United States.
- The corporation was required to provide the Secretary of the Treasury with "statements of the amount of the capital stock of the said corporation, and of the debts due to the same; of the monies deposited therein; of the notes in circulation, and of the cash in hand" and the secretary was granted the right to inspect the accounting of the bank.
- Any bills issued by the bank were declared legal tender for payments to the United States
- Any fraud or wrongdoing in relation to the bank would be punished by a fine of three times the cost of the crime committed.

== See also ==
- First Bank of the United States
- Monetary sovereignty
- Second Report on Public Credit
- Report on a Plan for the Further Support of Public Credit

== Concerning the First National Bank in Colonial America ==
- Jefferson, Thomas (December 13, 1790). "Introductory Note: Second Report on the Further Provision Necessary for Establishing Public Credit (Report on a National Bank), 13 December 1790". Founders Online. U.S. National Archives and Records Administration.
- Hamilton, Alexander (December 13, 1790). "Final Version of the Second Report on the Further Provision Necessary for Establishing Public Credit (Report on a National Bank), 13 December 1790". Founders Online. U.S. National Archives and Records Administration.
- Madison, James (February 2, 1791). "The Bank Bill, 2 February 1791". Founders Online. U.S. National Archives and Records Administration.
- Madison, James (February 8, 1791). "The Bank Bill, 8 February 1791". Founders Online. U.S. National Archives and Records Administration.
- Jefferson, Thomas (February 15, 1791). "To George Washington from Thomas Jefferson, 15 February 1791". Founders Online. U.S. National Archives and Records Administration.
- Jefferson, Thomas (February 15, 1791). "Opinion on the Constitutionality of the Bill for Establishing a National Bank, 15 February 1791". Founders Online. U.S. National Archives and Records Administration.
- Hamilton, Alexander (February 23, 1791). "Enclosure: Opinion on the Constitutionality of an Act to Establish a Bank, 23 February 1791". Founders Online. U.S. National Archives and Records Administration.
- Hamilton, Alexander (February 23, 1791). "Final Version of an Opinion on the Constitutionality of an Act to Establish a Bank, 23 February 1791". Founders Online. U.S. National Archives and Records Administration.

== Historical Video Archives ==
- Alexander Hamilton: First Secretary of the Treasury on YouTube
- Alexander Hamilton Funds the National Debt on YouTube
- Alexander Hamilton, Shaping the New Nation on YouTube
- Why a National Bank on YouTube
