= Hamiltonian economic program =

1791–95 policies proposed by U.S. Founding Father Alexander Hamilton

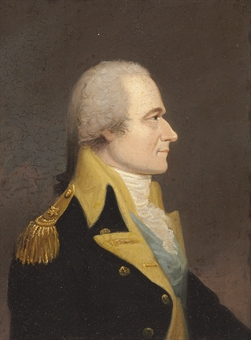
Alexander Hamilton, a portrait by William J. Weaver now housed in the U.S. Department of State

In United States history, the Hamiltonian economic program was the set of measures that were proposed by American Founding Father and first Secretary of the Treasury Alexander Hamilton in four notable reports and implemented by Congress during George Washington's first term. They outlined a coherent program of national mercantilism government-assisted economic development.

- First Report on the Public Credit – pertaining to the assumption of federal and state debts and finance of the United States government (1790). Hamilton included his plan to tax distilled spirits among other domestic goods to boost revenue. He thought that a tax on spirits would be the least objectionable way to make money, as it could be philosophically equated to a pigouvian or sin tax. However, his new tax set off the Whiskey Rebellion which highlighted separation in social classes as rural Pennsylvanian farmers fought against the government. Eventually, the tax was repealed, but the incident greatly emphasized the government's willingness and ability to suppress violent resistance to its laws.
- Second Report on Public Credit – pertaining to the establishment of a national bank (1790)
- Report on Manufactures – pertaining to the policies to be followed to encourage manufacturing and industry in the United States (1791)
- Report on a Plan for the Further Support of Public Credit – pertaining to how to deal with the system of public credit after Hamilton's resignation, including complete extinguishment of the public debt (1795)

== See also ==
- American School, the Hamiltonian American School of economics practiced by the United States from 1790s–1970s rooted in the three Reports, based on tariffs which built the American industrial infrastructure
- American System, economic plan based on the ideas of Henry Clay
- Federalist Party, Hamilton's political party, which supported his program and pushed most of it through Congress
