= Internal improvements =

Historical term for public works in the US

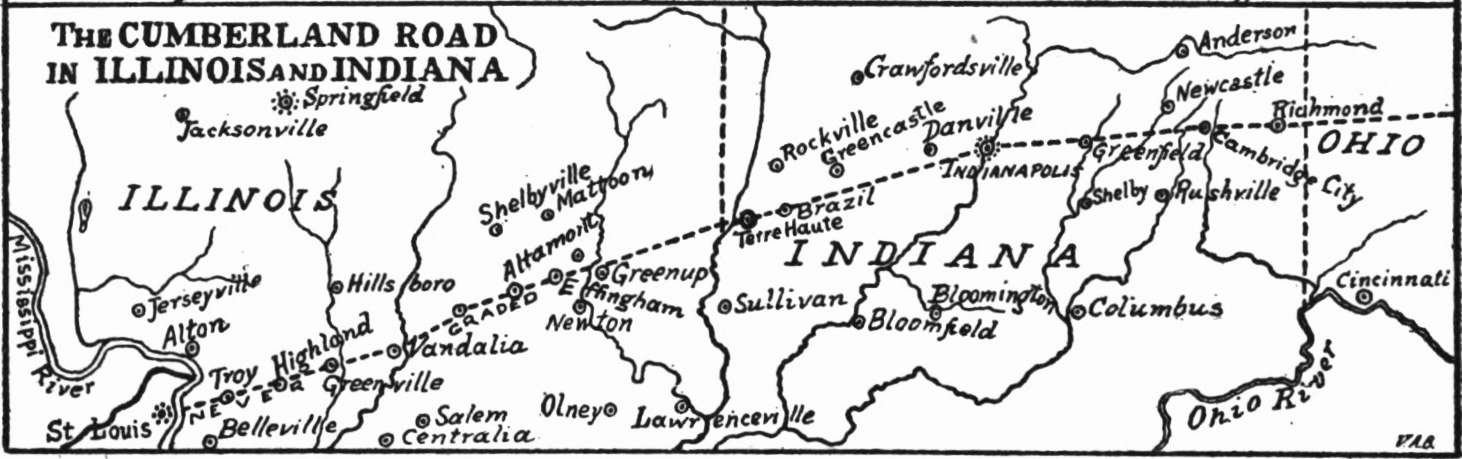
Cumberland Road (National Road) through Illinois and Indiana, mapped 1904

Internal improvements is the term used historically in the United States for public works from the end of the American Revolution through much of the 19th century, mainly for the creation of a transportation infrastructure: roads, turnpikes, canals, harbors and navigation improvements. This older term carries the connotation of a political movement that called for the exercise of public spirit as well as the search for immediate economic gain. Improving the country's natural advantages by developments in transportation was, in the eyes of George Washington and many others, a duty incumbent both on governments and on individual citizens.

== Background ==
While the need for inland transportation improvements was universally recognized, there were great differences over the questions of how these should be planned, funded, developed, and constructed. Also, with various routes available, questions of where these improvements should be made, and by whom (the federal government, the individual states, or local jurisdictions), became the basis of political and regional contention. Federal assistance for "internal improvements" evolved slowly and haphazardly; it became the product of contentious congressional factions and an executive branch generally concerned with avoiding unconstitutional federal intrusions into state affairs.

Late project successes, both European and pre-revolutionary, demonstrated the time and cost savings as well as greater potential commerce and profit which these improvements created, but the early inability of Congress to develop a system of appropriations hobbled federal efforts; this threw responsibility for internal improvements on the states, following the veto of the Bonus Bill of 1817. New York scored fabulous success in 1825 with completion of its Erie Canal, but other state programs sank due to a combination of excessive ambition, shaky financing, and internal squabbling. One early government-funded project was the Cumberland Road, which Congress approved in 1806 to build a road between the Potomac River and the Ohio River; it was later pressed on through Ohio and Indiana and halfway through Illinois, as well along what is now U.S. Route 40. It became the National Road and was the single largest project of the antebellum era, with nearly US$7 million in federal dollars spent between 1806 and 1841. The debates on Ohio statehood and on the Cumberland Road apparently included no significant discussion of the Constitutional questions involved.

The issue of government subsidies for internal improvements was a key point of contention between the two major political factions in America for the first sixty years of the 19th century, specifically the mercantilist Hamiltonian Federalists and the more-or-less laissez faire Jeffersonian Democratic-Republicans. Political support began with Alexander Hamilton and his Report on Manufactures at the turn of the 19th century, and continued with the Whig Party, led by Henry Clay from 1832 until its demise in 1852, and then by the Republican Party from its formation in 1856. Support for internal improvements became a part of the economic plan, and the economic school of thought that would develop, but it would not come easily.

While the Federalist strand of republicanism defended internal improvements as agents of the "general welfare" or "public good", another strand unraveled from the republican tapestry to denounce such schemes as "corruption", taxing the many to benefit the few. Critics of internal improvement schemes did not have to dig deep under the veneer of "public good" to uncover self-interest. Washington's scheme for Potomac River improvement also happened to pass conveniently by his Mount Vernon estate and extend westward toward some 60,000 acres (24,000 ha) of undeveloped land in his possession. By the end of the 1790s, leaders of the emerging Democratic-Republican Party regularly assaulted the "monied gentry" and their improvement plans as visionary and extravagant, and gradually eroded public confidence in government action and authority. In their assaults on the Federalists' national agenda, Old Republicans perfected a language of opposition that provided the template for almost all future critiques of federal power: fear of centralized power, burdening taxpayers, taxing one locale for the benefit of another, creating self-perpetuating bureaucracies, distant governments undermining local authority, and subsidizing the schemes of the wealthy at public expense.

== Early development ==
The federal role in funding and constructing internal improvements was one of the most persistent and contentious issues of American politics in the years after the revolution. With independence, elites based in the various regional economies of the American coastal plain did share an interest in developing the transportation infrastructure of the country. Unlike Europe, they were isolated from one another by poor inland transportation links and the legacy of their colonial trading patterns, and separated from their interior lands by formidable geographic obstacles. George Washington repeatedly pressed his vision of a network of canals and highways to be created and overseen through the auspices of wise leaders at the head of an active republican government. This initial thrust for internal improvements fell victim to what Washington considered the narrow-minded and provincial outlook of the individual states, and federal authority hamstrung by the Articles of Confederation to the point of impotence.

The fledgling government, however, set historic precedent and broad transportation policy in 1787 concerning new lands west of the original colonies in the Northwest Ordinance; it established free usage of its inland waterways and their connecting portages, and expressed this intent for any other lands and resources in future states. While some consider that Washington watched as rivalries between the states of Maryland and Virginia gradually rendered his Potomac Company null and void by withholding public monies, out of fear that a rival state might derive greater benefit from their own appropriations, others consider these events in a different light. The preliminary report of the Inland Waterways Commission issued in 1908, provides a unique topical perspective on these and other concurrent historical events ongoing at the time. It notes: "The earliest movement toward developing the inland waterways of the country began when, under the influence of George Washington, Virginia and Maryland appointed commissioners primarily to consider the navigation and improvement of the Potomac; they met in 1785 in Alexandria and adjourned to Mount Vernon, where they planned for extension, pursuant to which they reassembled with representatives of other States in Annapolis in 1786; again finding the task a growing one, a further conference was arranged in Philadelphia in 1787, with delegates from all the States. There the deliberations resulted in the framing of the Constitution, whereby the thirteen original States were united primarily on a commercial basis —the commerce of the times being chiefly by water."

Although the country already had an extensive coastline, inland river systems, and the largest freshwater lake system in the world, the 1803 Louisiana Purchase greatly enhanced the area claimed, as well as the need for developmental improvement. The acquisition brought the combined lands of the Missouri, Ohio, and Mississippi River basins all under federal control.

Many Americans also shared the belief that increased inter-regional communications would strengthen the fragile union by fostering shared economic interests. The case for federally funded internal improvements was thus strong, because such a program could serve both local and national economic interests as well as a critical nation-building role. Promoters furthermore made a convincing case that only the federal government could effect the desired projects, since the federal budget typically operated in surplus while the states lacked adequate resources, and the states faced difficult coordination problems best solved through national political institutions. Secretary of the Treasury Albert Gallatin's 1808 Report on the Subject of Public Roads and Canals was one such early plan.

== Later efforts ==
Henry Clay's American System, devised in the burst of nationalism that followed the War of 1812, remains one of the most historically significant examples of a government-sponsored program to harmonize and balance the nation's agriculture, commerce, and industry. This "System" consisted of three mutually reinforcing parts: a tariff to protect and promote American industry; a national bank to foster commerce; and federal subsidies for roads, canals, and other "internal improvements" to develop profitable markets for agriculture. Funds for these subsidies would be obtained from tariffs and sales of public lands. Clay argued that a vigorously maintained system of sectional economic interdependence would eliminate the chance of renewed subservience to the free-trade, laissez-faire "British System." In the years from 1816 to 1828, Congress enacted programs supporting each of the American System's major elements. After the 1829 inauguration of Andrew Jackson, with his administration's emphasis on a limited role for the federal government and sectional autonomy, the American System became the focus of anti-Jackson opposition that coalesced into the new Whig Party under the leadership of Henry Clay.

== See also ==
- Old Buncombe Road
- Maysville Road veto
