= Report on a Plan for the Further Support of Public Credit =

1795 report on fiscal policy by U.S. Treasury Secretary Alexander Hamilton

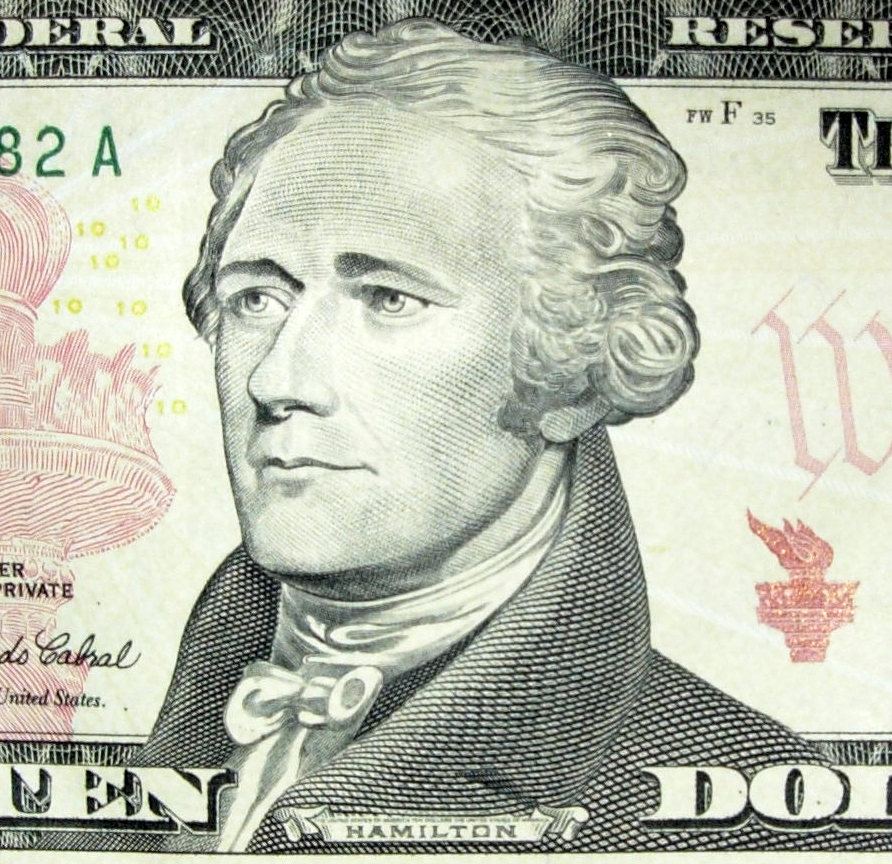
Alexander Hamilton on the $10 Bill

In United States history, the Report on a Plan for the Further Support of Public Credit is the "valedictory" report issued to the US Congress on January 16, 1795 by the first Secretary of the Treasury, Alexander Hamilton. In addition to defending the fiscal programs that he had imposed thus far and extolling a system of finance that was "prosperous beyond all expectations", the report enumerated existing sources of revenue, outlined the plan for the "Redemption of the public debt" and its accruing interest to stabilize the current system of funding, and proposed amendments to the System of Public Credit that were designed to "prevent that progressive accumulation of Debt which must ultimately endanger all Government."

Essentially, his report was submitted to address the fears of the Democratic-Republicans that the public debt would later become unmanageable. Hamilton subsequently discussed resolutions adopted by Congress for the sequestration of British debts in the United States and how they were "not only unwarranted by principle or usage, but entirely subversive of the sound maxims of public Credit."

He finished by defending the need for credit in an ever-developing world as not only a public defense of sovereignty but also a private tool for prosperity.

== Outline ==
=== Existing Revenue Sources ===
- Imported Articles (permanent and commensurate with the existence of debt)
- The Tonnage of Ships and Vessels (permanent and commensurate with the existence of debt)
- Spirits distilled within the United States & Stills (permanent and commensurate with the existence of debt; surplus to be applied to payment on principal)
- The Postage of Letters (no permanent or particular appropriation)
- Fees on Patents (no permanent or particular appropriation)
- Dividends of Bank Stock (permanent and commensurate with the duration of the property in the stock)
- Snuff manufactured within the United States (temporary; two year from respective passings)
- Sugar refined within the United States
- Sales at Auction
- Licenses to retail Wines & distilled Spirits
- Carriages for the Conveyance of Persons

=== Existing Expenditures and Debts ===
- $600,000 for the support of the Government of the United States and their common defence.
- Interest on the foreign loans.
- Interest on the Stock created by the Loan in domestic debt, or more properly in the original debt of the United States.
- Interest on the Stock created by the loan in the Debts of the respective States.
- Interest on the Balances due to creditor States, which dispositions establish priorities according to the order in which they are here enumerated.
- That the temporary duties are charged with a specific Sum of $1,292,137.38 and with the payment of Interest on a sum of 1,000,000 of dollars authorised to be borrowed for the expenses of foreign intercourse.
- That the funded domestic Debt of the United States consists of three species of Stock: one bearing a present interest of 6 per Centum per Annum(%), another bearing an equal interest after the year 1800, a third bearing a present Interest of 3%; the interest in each case payable quarter Yearly.
- That the 6% Stock present and deferred can be redeemed in no greater proportion than at the rate of 8% of the original sum on Account both of principal & interest; but the 3% Stock is redeemable at pleasure.
- That the provision for subscribing to the Loan in Domestic Debt expired on the last of December 1794, & that no further provision has been made for the unsubscribed residue.
- That the funding Act expressly confirms the contracts and rights of the Creditors of the United States, who shall not think fit to subscribe to the loan, and gives an expectation to them of further and other arrangements upon the event of the propositions made to them.
- That the proceeds of all the Lands of the United States in the western Territory are appropriated to the redemption of all that part of the public debt, for which prior to the funding Act, or by virtue thereof, the United States were or are liable.
- That, in addition to this, a regular sinking fund has been successively constituted, to be applied under the direction of five principal Officers of the United States with the approbation of the president, hitherto composed of three parts: 1st the Surplus of the duties on imports & Tonnage to the end of 1790; 2ndly. the proceeds of loans not exceeding 2.000.000 of Dollars authorised to be borrowed for the purpose (these two funds to be invested in purchases); and 3rdly (in which the two former resolve themselves) the Interest on the public debt purchased redeemed or paid into the Treasury, together with the surpluses, if any, of monies appropriated for Interest; to be applied 1st to purchases of the debt till the fund is equal to 2% of the outstanding Stock bearing a present interest of 6% 2nd to the redemption of that Stock, & lastly to purchases of any unredeemed residue of the public debt. But there is reserved out of this fund a sum not exceeding 8%, towards the payment of Interest & reimbursing of principal of the loans made for purchases of the Debt.

== Propositions ==
Following his outline Hamilton proposed what he believed to be 10 necessary amendments to ensure its stability and survival but not immortality in the years ahead.

== Conclusion ==
=== Seigniorage and Sequestration ===
Hamilton's conclusion included two philosophical questions, both of which had far reaching implications on the idea of public credit. In essence, did a government have the right to tax its own funds, and did the government have a right to sequester or confiscate the funds of a foreign creditor in the event of a disagreement or war with that individual's nation?

Hamilton believed that a government entering into a contract with a creditor enters into that contract with an individual in the state of nature, rather than as part of its or another's society. Firstly, to take a percentage of revenue due to a creditor from within its own borders amounts to a broken promise, which upends the faith upon which credit derives its value. If a reasonable creditor cannot expect a contract with the government to be upheld, others will not venture into precarious future investments, and the availability of funds will shrink. As availability of funds relates directly to the leverage a government can use to grow its economy, the breach of faith can have fatal consequences on the future of economic stability. Also, a tax on creditor citizens would then be wildly inestimable but definitively disproportionate. The creditors would be charged not only the normal taxes subjected upon consumption but also those on investment. Therefore, those who had faith in government to invest in their success would unreasonably be charged the most for that success.

As to the question of foreign creditors, some believed that a government had the right to confiscate all properties of those citizens residing within the borders of belligerent nations. Perhaps, Hamilton agreed, property obtained under the protection and the security of a belligerent nation, which is paid for through taxes to that nation ought to be, at least politically, subject to confiscation. However, when the property in question is secured under the faith of the government and the laws of the debtor nation, that faith should not be upended:

What in fact is property but a fiction, without the beneficial use of it? In many cases indeed the income or annuity is the property itself: And though general usage may controul the principle, it can only be as far as the usage clearly goes. It must not be extended by analogy.

=== Credit ===
Hamilton reminded Congress that the United States was still quite young and so needed to maintain its vitality and energy through the "invigorating principle" of credit to compete with the European powers, rather than to subject itself to their whims through the necessity of their manufactures.

It is impossible for a Country to contend on equal terms, or to be secure against the enterprises of other nations without being able equally with them to avail itself of [credit]. And to a young Country with moderate pecuniary Capital and not a very various industry, it is still more necessary than to Countries, more advanced in both.

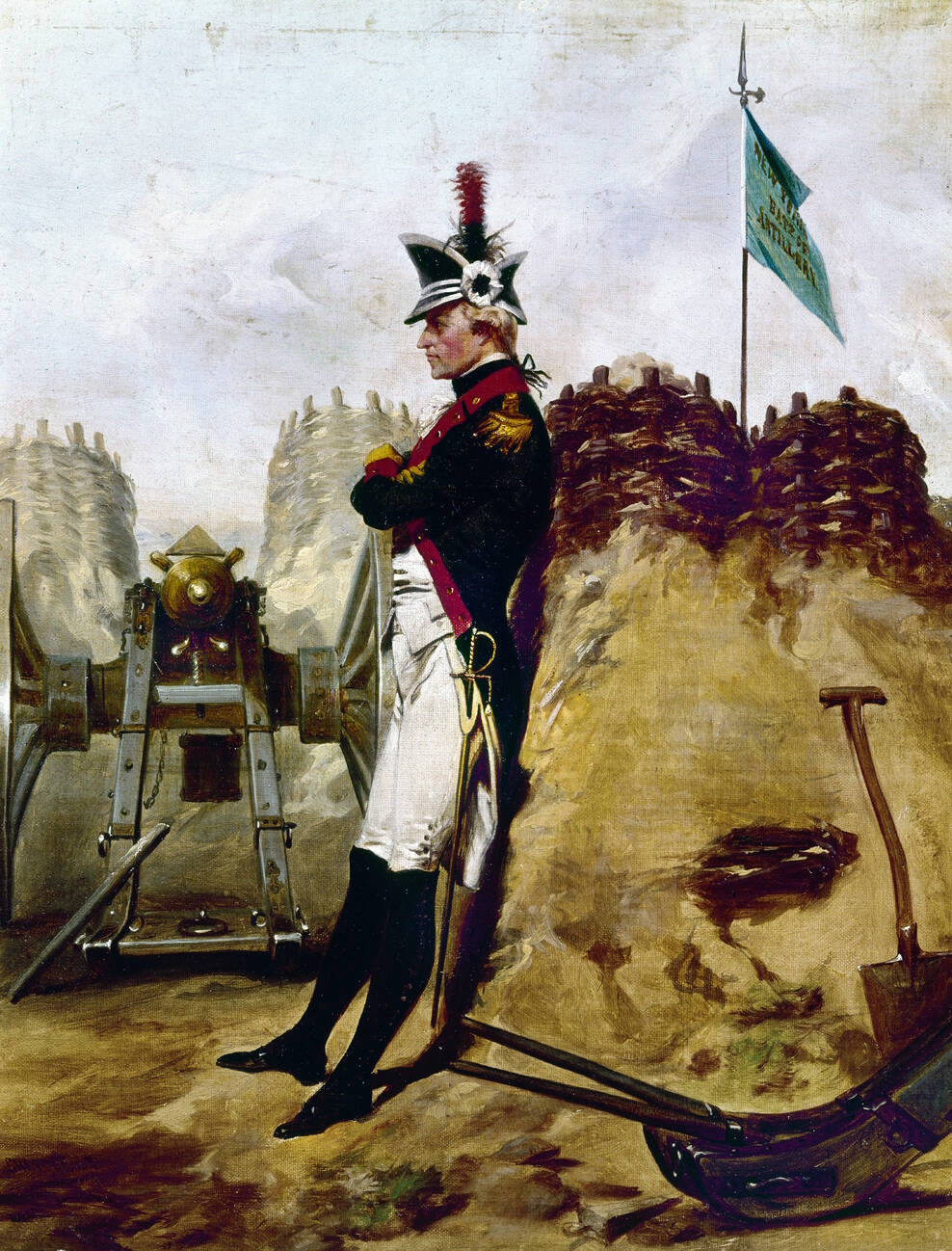
Alexander Hamilton in the Uniform of the New York Artillery, by Alonzo Chappel

In addition to the external benefits and potential ills, Hamilton stated that public and private credit were inevitably tied and that private credit was equally necessary in a developing country for people of all occupations to begin their endeavors.

'Tis Wisdom in every case to cherish what is useful and guard against its abuse. 'Twill be the truest policy in the United States to give all possible energy to Public Credit, by a firm adherence to its strictest maxims, and yet to avoid the ills of an excessive employment of it, by true œconomy and system, in, the public expenditures, by steadily cultivating peace, and by using sincere, efficient and persevering endeavors to diminish present debts, prevent the accumulation of new, and secure the discharge within a reasonable period of such as it may be matter of necessity to contract. 'Twill be wise to cultivate and foster private Credit by an exemplary observance of the principles of public Credit, and to guard against the misuse of the former by a speedy and vigorous administration of Justice, and by taking away every temptation to run in debt founded on the hope of evading the Just claims of Creditors.

== Resignation from Treasury ==
On January 31, 1795, Hamilton stepped down from his position as Secretary of the Treasury and returned to his legal private practice in New York.

== See also ==
- Bibliography of Alexander Hamilton
- First Report on the Public Credit
- Second Report on Public Credit
- Report on Manufactures
- The Federalist Papers
- Federalist Party
