= First Bank of the United States =

American national bank (1791–1811)

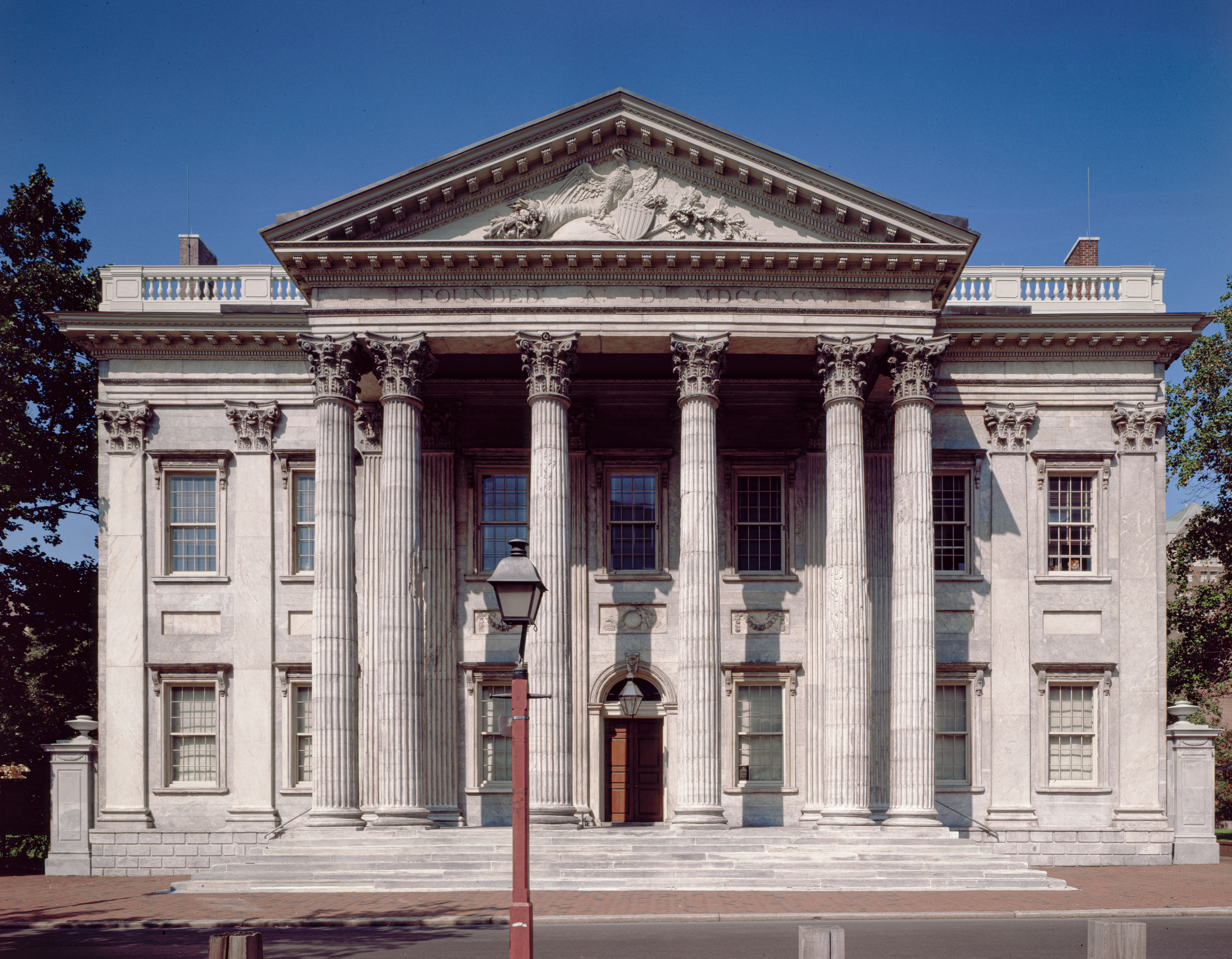
- 3rd Street façade
- Type: Public–private partnership
- Industry: Banking
- Founded: 1791
- Defunct: 1811; 215 years ago
- Fate: Liquidated
- Successor: Second Bank of the United States (federal); Girard Bank (building)
- Headquarters: Philadelphia, Pennsylvania, U.S.
- Key people: Alexander Hamilton (proposal); Thomas Willing (president 1791–1807); George Washington

Bank Bill of 1791
- Long title: An Act to incorporate the subscribers to the Bank of the United States.
- Nicknames: First Bank of the United States Act
- Enacted by: the 1st United States Congress
- Effective: February 25, 1791

Citations
- Statutes at Large: 1 Stat. 191

Legislative history
- Introduced in the Senate as S. 17 by Alexander Hamilton (proposed) on December 23, 1790; Passed the Senate on January 20, 1791 (Voice vote); Passed the House on February 8, 1791 (39–20); Signed into law by President George Washington on February 25, 1791

United States Supreme Court cases
- McCulloch v. Maryland, 17 U.S. 316 (1819)

The President, Directors and Company of the Bank of the United States, commonly known as the First Bank of the United States, was a national bank, chartered for a term of twenty years, by the United States Congress on February 25, 1791. It followed the Bank of North America, the nation's first de facto national bank. However, neither served the functions of a modern central bank: they did not set monetary policy, regulate private banks, hold their excess reserves, or act as a lender of last resort. They were national insofar as they were allowed to have branches in multiple states and lend money to the US government. Other banks in the US were each chartered by, and only allowed to have branches in, a single state.

Establishment of the Bank of the United States was part of a three-part expansion of federal fiscal and monetary power, along with a federal mint and excise taxes, championed by Alexander Hamilton, first secretary of the treasury. Hamilton believed a national bank was necessary to stabilize and improve the nation's credit, and to improve handling of the financial business of the United States government under the newly enacted Constitution.

The First Bank building, located in Philadelphia, Pennsylvania, within Independence National Historical Park, was completed in 1797, and is a National Historic Landmark for its historic and architectural significance.

== Origins and history ==
=== Background ===
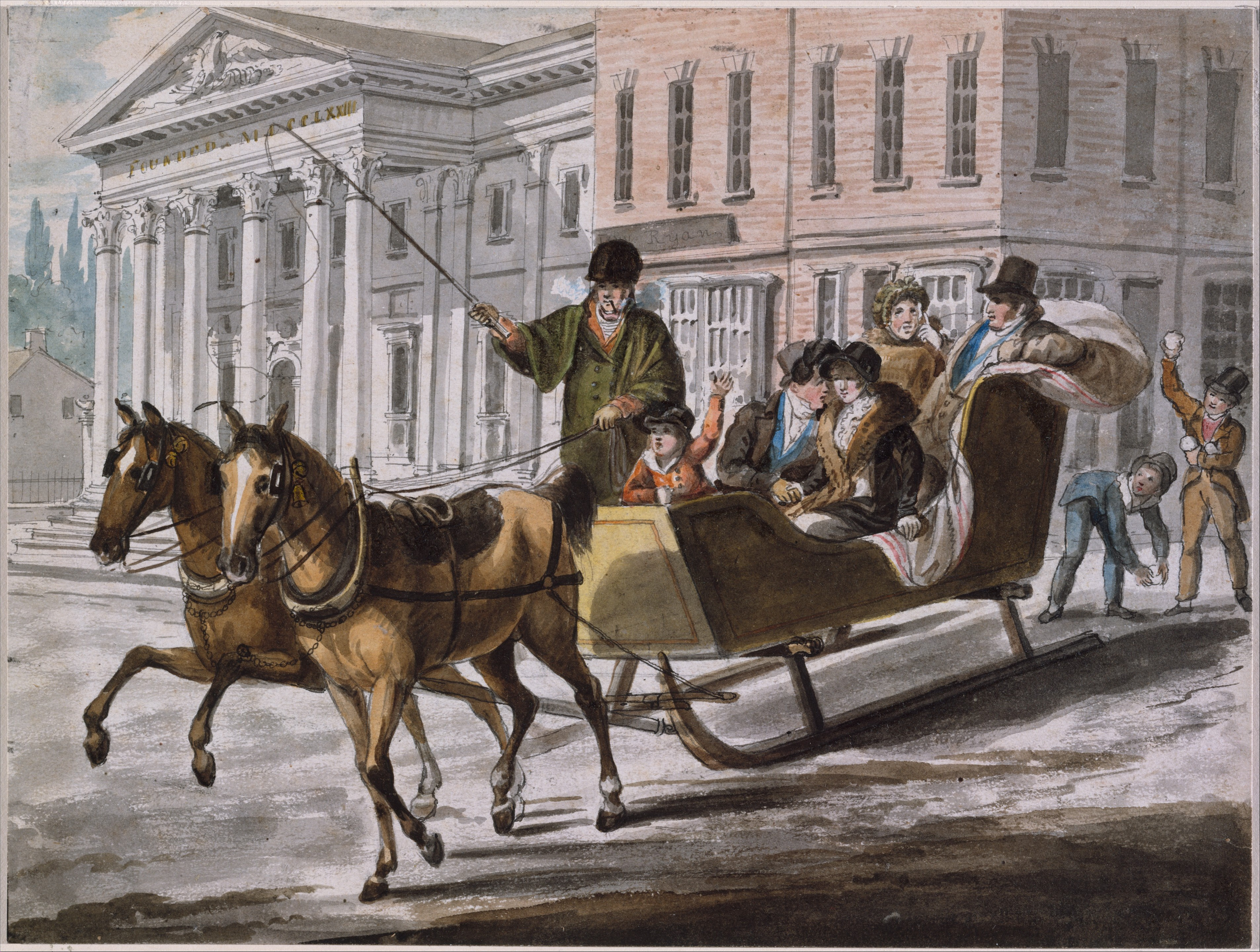
John Lewis Krimmel, Winter Scene in Philadelphia (ca.1813)

Alexander Hamilton was the first secretary of the treasury. In addition to sponsoring a national bank, Hamilton's other measures included an assumption of the state war debts by the U.S. government, establishment of a mint and imposition of a federal excise tax. The goals of Hamilton's measures were to:

- Establish financial order, clarity, and precedence in and of the newly formed United States.
- Establish credit—both within the country and overseas—for the new nation.
- Resolve the issue of the fiat currency, issued by the Continental Congress immediately prior to and during the American Revolutionary War—the "Continental".

In simpler words, Hamilton's four goals were to:

- Have the Federal Government assume the Revolutionary War debts of the several states
- Pay off the war debts
- Raise money for the new government
- Establish a national bank and create a common currency

The tendency of a national bank is to increase public and private credit. The former gives power to the state for the protection of its rights and interests, and the latter facilitates and extends the operations of commerce amongst individuals.

— Alexander Hamilton, December 1790 report to George Washington

=== Proposal ===
According to the plan put before the first session of the First Congress in 1789, Hamilton proposed establishing the initial funding for the First Bank of the United States through the sale of $10 million in stock of which the United States government would purchase the first $2 million in shares. Hamilton, foreseeing the objection that this could not be done since the U.S. government did not have $2 million, proposed that the government purchase the stock using money lent to it by the bank; the loan to be paid back in ten equal annual installments. The remaining $8 million of stock would be available to the public, both in the United States and overseas. The chief requirement of these non-government purchases was that one-quarter of the purchase price had to be paid in gold or silver; the remaining balance could be paid in bonds, acceptable scrip, etc.

Unlike the Bank of England, the primary function of the bank would be to issue credit to the government and private interests, for internal improvements and other economic development, per Hamilton's system of Public Credit. The business would be involved in on behalf of the federal government—a depository for collected taxes, making short-term loans to the government to cover real or potential temporary income gaps, serving as a holding site for both incoming and outgoing monies—was considered highly important but still secondary in nature.

There were other, non-negotiable conditions for the establishment of the First Bank of the United States. Among these were:

- That the bank would have a twenty-year charter running from 1791 to 1811, after which time it would be up to the Congress to approve or deny renewal of the bank and its charter; however, during that time no other federal bank would be authorized; states, for their part, would be free to charter however many intrastate banks they wished.
- That the bank, to avoid any appearance of impropriety, would:
  1. be forbidden to buy a government bond.
  2. have a mandatory rotation of directors.
  3. neither issue notes nor incur debts beyond its actual capitalization.
- That foreigners, whether overseas or residing in the United States, would be allowed to be First Bank of the United States stockholders, but would not be allowed to vote.
- That the Secretary of the Treasury would be free to remove government deposits, inspect the books, and require statements regarding the bank's condition as frequently as once a week.

To ensure that the government could meet both the current and future demands of its governmental accounts, an additional source of funding was required, "for interest payments on the assumed state debts would begin to fall due at the end of 1791...those payments would require $788,333 annually, and... an additional $38,291 was needed to cover deficiencies in the funds that had been appropriated for existing commitments." To achieve this, Hamilton repeated a suggestion he had made nearly a year before—increase the duty on imported spirits, plus raise the excise tax on domestically distilled whiskey and other liquors. Local opposition to the tax led to the Whiskey Rebellion.

=== Opposition ===
Jefferson's views:
"Hamilton's financial system had then passed. It had two objects; 1st, like a puzzle, to exclude popular understanding and inquiry; 2nd, as a machine for the corruption of the legislature; for he avowed the opinion, that man could be governed by one of two motives only, force or interest; force, he observed, in this country was out of the question, and the interests, therefore, of the members must be laid hold of, to keep the legislative in unison with the executive. And with grief and shame, it must be acknowledged that his machine was not without effect; that even in this, the birth of our government, some members were found sordid enough to bend their duty to their interests, and to look after personal rather than public good.

It is well known that during the war the greatest difficulty we encountered was the want of money or means to pay our soldiers who fought, or our farmers, manufacturers, and merchants, who furnished the necessary supplies of food and clothing for them. After the expedient of paper money had exhausted itself, certificates of debt were given to the individual creditors, with an assurance of payment so soon as the United States should be able. But the distresses of these people often obliged them to part with these for the half, the fifth, and even a tenth of their value; and speculators had made a trade of cozening them from the holders by the most fraudulent practices, and persuasions that they would never be paid. In the bill for funding and paying these, Hamilton made no difference between the original holders and the fraudulent purchasers of this paper."

— Thomas Jefferson, February 4 entry in The Anas

Hamilton's bank proposal faced widespread resistance from opponents of increased federal power. Secretary of State Thomas Jefferson and James Madison led the opposition, which claimed that the bank was unconstitutional, and that it benefited merchants and investors at the expense of the majority of the population.

Like most of the Southern members of Congress, Jefferson and Madison also opposed a second of the three proposals of Hamilton: establishing an official government Mint. They believed this centralization of power away from local banks was dangerous to a sound monetary system and was mostly to the benefit of business interests in the commercial north, not southern agricultural interests, arguing that the right to own property would be infringed by these proposals. Furthermore, they contended that the creation of such a bank violated the Constitution, which specifically stated that Congress was to regulate weights and measures and issue coined money (rather than mint and bills of credit).

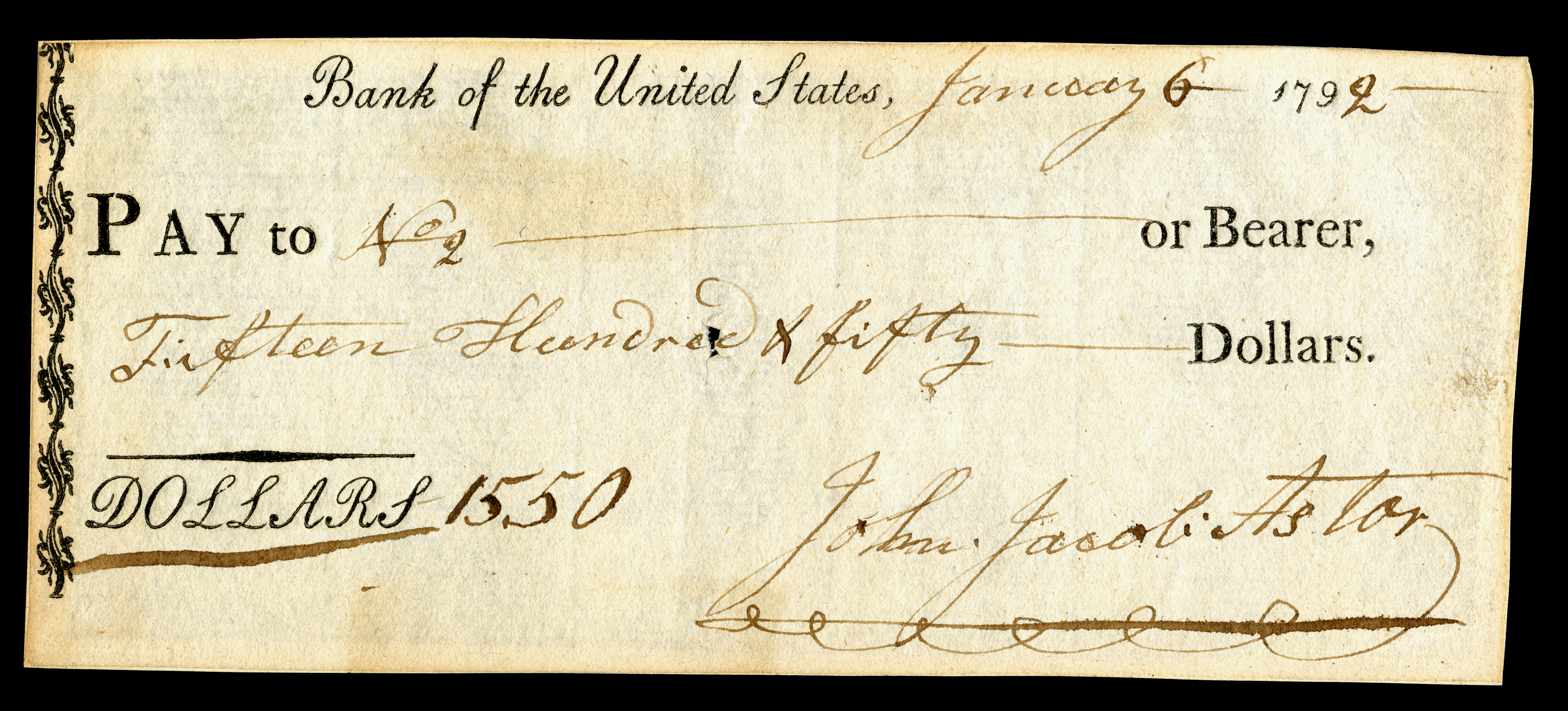
Bank of the United States check signed by John Jacob Astor in 1792

The first part of the bill, the concept, and establishment of a national mint, met with no real objection, and sailed through; it was assumed the second and third part (the bank and an excise tax to finance it) would likewise glide through, and in their own way they did: The House version of the bill, despite some heated objections, easily passed. The Senate version of the bill did likewise, with considerably fewer, and milder, objections. It was when "the two bills changed houses, complications set in. In the Senate, Hamilton's supporters objected to the House's alteration of the plans for the excise tax."

The establishment of the bank also raised early questions of constitutionality in the new government. Hamilton, then secretary of the treasury, argued that the bank was an effective means to utilize the authorized powers of the government implied under the law of the Constitution. Secretary of State Thomas Jefferson argued that the bank violated traditional property laws and that its relevance to constitutionally authorized powers was weak. Another argument came from James Madison, who believed Congress had not received the power to incorporate a bank or any other governmental agency. His argument rested primarily on the Tenth Amendment: that all powers not endowed to Congress are retained by the States (or the people). Additionally, his belief was that if the Constitution's writers had wanted Congress to have such power, they would have made it explicit. The decision would ultimately fall on President George Washington, following his deliberate investigation of the cabinet members' opinions.

=== Presidential approval ===
George Washington initially declared that he was hesitant to sign the "bank bill" into law. Washington asked for the written advice and supporting reasons from all his cabinet members—most particularly from Hamilton. Attorney General Edmund Randolph from Virginia felt that the bill was unconstitutional. Jefferson, also from Virginia, agreed that Hamilton's proposal was against both the spirit and letter of the Constitution. Hamilton, who, unlike his fellow cabinet members, came from New York, quickly responded to those who claimed incorporation of the bank unconstitutional. While Hamilton's rebuttals were many and varied, chief among them were these two:

- What the government could do for a person (incorporate), it could not refuse to do for an "artificial person", a business. And the First Bank of the United States is privately owned and not a government agency, was a business. "Thus...unquestionably incident to sovereign power to erect corporations to that of the United States, in relation to the objects entrusted to the management of the government."
- Any government by its very nature was sovereign "and includes by force of the term a right to attainment of the ends...which are not precluded by restrictions & exceptions specified in the constitution...

On February 25, 1791, convinced that the constitution authorized the measure, Washington signed the "bank bill" into law.

On March 19, 1791 Washington appointed three Commissioners for the taking of subscriptions for this new bank: Thomas Willing, David Rittenhouse, and Samuel Howell.

Willing was later elected as President on October 25, 1791, until he resigned due to ill health on November 10, 1807. The bank's Philadelphia branch opened its doors on December 12, 1791. Willing was succeeded by David Lenox, serving until the expiration of its charter on March 4, 1811.

=== Expiration of charter ===
After Hamilton left office in 1795, the new secretary of the treasury Oliver Wolcott Jr. informed Congress that, due to the existing state of government finances, more money was needed. This could be achieved either by selling the government's shares of stock in the bank or by raising taxes. Wolcott advised the first choice. Congress quickly agreed. Hamilton objected, believing that the dividends on that stock had been inviolably pledged for the support of the sinking fund to retire the debt. Hamilton tried to organize opposition to the measure but was unsuccessful.

=== Purchase by Girard ===
After the charter for the First Bank of the United States expired in 1811, Stephen Girard purchased most of its stock as well as the building and its furnishings on South Third Street in Philadelphia and opened his own bank, later known as Girard Bank. Girard hired George Simpson, the cashier of the First Bank of the United States, as cashier of the new bank, and with seven other employees, opened for business on May 18, 1812. He allowed the Trustees of the First Bank of the United States to use some offices and space in the vaults to continue the process of winding down the affairs of the closed bank at a nominal rent.

Over its early history the bank was known as "Girard's Bank," or as "Girard Bank" or also as "Stephen Girard's Bank" or even the "Bank of Stephen Girard." Girard was the sole proprietor of his bank, and thus avoided the Pennsylvania state law which prohibited an unincorporated association of persons from establishing a bank, and which required a charter from the legislature for a banking corporation.

In 1816, the Second Bank of the United States was created, modeled on the expired First Bank.

== Bank building and branches ==
- First Bank of the United States
- U.S. National Register of Historic Places
- U.S. National Historic Landmark
- Measured drawing of the First Bank from the Historic American Buildings Survey.
- Location: 120 S 3rd Street; Philadelphia, Pennsylvania
- Coordinates: 39°56′53″N 75°08′47″W
- Built: 1797
- Architects: Samuel Blodgett, and James Hoban
- Architectural style: Greek Revival
- NRHP reference No.: 87001292
- Added to NRHP: May 4, 1987

The First Bank of the United States was established in Philadelphia, Pennsylvania, while the city served as the national capital, from 1790 to 1800. The bank began operations in Carpenters' Hall in 1791, some 200 feet from its permanent home. Branches opened in Boston, New York, Charleston, and Baltimore in 1792, followed by branches in Norfolk (1800), Savannah (1802), Washington, D.C. (1802), and New Orleans (1805).

Design of the bank building is credited to Samuel Blodgett, Superintendent of Buildings for the new capital in Washington, DC, although it has also been attributed to James Hoban. It was completed in 1797 and was the first building specifically for the new federal government.

The First Bank of the United States has received various designations as a historic building. It was included in Independence National Historical Park when the park was formed in 1956. The building's architecture was studied by the Historic American Buildings Survey in 1958. With the rest of Independence National Historical Park, it was listed on the National Register of Historic Places on October 15, 1966, and the bank was then declared a National Historic Landmark on May 4, 1987. It is described in the landmark designation as an early masterpiece of monumental Classical Revival design.

The building was closed to the public since beginning in the 1970s until 2026. Until about 2000, the building housed offices for Independence National Historical Park. A proposal to have it house the collection of the Philadelphia Civil War Museum was abandoned when funding from the state of Pennsylvania was not forthcoming.

In June 2023, Independence National Historical Park received $22 million from the Great American Outdoors Act to renovate the building and develop a museum about the early American economy. The museum opened on July 1, 2026.

== See also ==
- Bank Bill of 1791
- Federal Reserve Act
- History of central banking in the United States
- United States Department of the Treasury
- Stephen Simpson (writer), journalist and outspoken critic of the bank and its practices
- List of National Historic Landmarks in Philadelphia
- McCulloch v. Maryland, Supreme Court case holding that Maryland could not tax the First Bank of the United States
- National Register of Historic Places listings in Center City, Philadelphia
