= Thomas Machin =

British-American soldier and construction engineer

- Born: March 20, 1744; England
- Died: April 3, 1816 (aged 72); Charleston, Montgomery County, New York, U.S.
- Military career
- Allegiance: (United States)
- Branch: Artillery
- New York Artillery: (United States) 1776–1780
- Rank: (United States) Second Lieutenant; (United States) Captain Lieutenant; (United States) Captain
- Units: 2nd Continental Artillery Regiment; Sullivan Expedition
- Known for: Machin's Mills Currency Mint; Hudson River Chains Placement; Surveying Cape Cod Canal
- American Revolutionary War: American Revolutionary War; Sullivan Expedition; Battle of Newtown; Yorktown campaign

Thomas Machin (March 20, 1744 – April 3, 1816) was a British-born American soldier and construction engineer. Machin was born in Staffordshire, England, and in his youth was apprenticed to English canal builder James Brindley. After arriving in America he was commissioned a Lieutenant of the artillery and then in July 1776, a Captain in Lamb's Artillery in which capacity he served for the duration of the conflict. (The commission, for various reasons, was not approved by congress until 1780.) In 1776 he was dispatched by George Washington to the Hudson Highlands to assist in defending the Hudson River and creating emplacements an obstructions in an alongside the river from Fort Montgomery up to Kingston. He was singularly responsible for emplacing the chain at Fort Montgomery prior to the British attack on that post in the fall of 1777. The Fort Montgomery chain was breached on October 7, 1777 when the British overran the forts. 'The Great Chain' at West Point, was emplaced by Machin the subsequent year at the direction of then New York Governor, George Clinton. That chain was never breached and remained in place until the end of the war, being rolled up and placed on the bank during the winter months when there was ice in the river. Following his service in the Hudson Valley he was attached to the Sullivan Expedition and was instrumental in the defeat of Joseph Brant's forces at the Battle of Newtown. He also participated in the Yorktown Campaign where he won a bet for his commander, Henry Knox, who had made a wager with French General Rochambeau regarding the relative accuracy of French and American Artillery, by destroying a British troopship. Following the war, he moved to Montgomery County, New York where he pursued his surveying and engineering activities. His son, Thomas Machin Jr. was a Brigadier General in the War of 1812. He died on April 3, 1816. He was a member of the Order of Cincinnati.

As a civil engineer Machin was conscripted for the planning of the Cape Cod Canal immediately following the Siege of Boston and was responsible for damming Lake Otsego (New York) to allow James Clinton's army to float down to Tioga along the Mohawk to join with Sullivan in August 1779.

== Machin's Mill ==
After the American Revolutionary War, Thomas Machin established Machin's Mill near Orange Lake, New York in 1787. Thomas Machin's Mint milled a variety of Early American currency some of which were stamped with a delicate and weightless copper originating from Great Britain consequently bearing a forgery for Colonial America's mill.

Colonial establishments producing milled coinage from imitation transatlantic coinage metal and copper coerced the Copper Panic of 1789. The copper crisis situated Colonial America's banks to barter paper back notes to reciprocate the devaluation of the copper coin and its net worth.

In response to the fraudulence of copper in circulation, the 2nd United States Congress passed the Coinage Act of 1792 and the Copper Coinage Act of 1792. The volume one statutes were enacted into law by first president of the United States George Washington.

== Bibliography ==
- Newman, Eric P. (1948). "Machin's Mills Mint". Internet Archive. Eric P. Newman Numismatic Education Society.
- Newman, Eric P. (1949). "Machin's Mills Correspondence". Internet Archive. Eric P. Newman Numismatic Education Society.
- Lifshitz, Kenneth B. (2010). Donderburg's Pumpkin Vine. CreateSpace Independent Publishing Platform. ISBN 978-1453804612.
