= Copper Coinage Act of 1792 =

- Long title: An Act to provide for a Copper Coinage.
- Enacted by: the 2nd United States Congress
- Effective: May 8, 1792

Citations
- Public law: Pub. L. 2–39
- Statutes at Large: 1 Stat. 283, Chap. 39

Legislative history
- Introduced in the Senate by Paine Wingate (F–NH) on May 8, 1792; Signed into law by President George Washington on May 8, 1792

Copper Coinage Act of 1792 is a United States statute authorizing copper coinage to be engraved and issued by the United States Mint. The Act of Congress confirmed the procurement of copper not to exceed a weight of 150 short tons (300,000 lb). The United States Mint procured a shipment of copper at a weight of 15 short tons (30,000 lb) as endorsed by the first director of the mint David Rittenhouse.

In 1792, the United States Mint petitioned Henry Voigt as the Chief Coiner providing craftsmanship as an artwork engraver for the United States copper coinage and early American currency. Mr. Rittenhouse commissioned the artisan talents of Robert Scot and Joseph Wright to assist the skillful engraving efforts of Henry Voigt as the Chief Engraver of the United States Mint.

== Declaration of the Act ==
Copper Coinage Act of 1792 was penned as two sections providing authorizations and rulings for the issuance of authentic copper currency by the United States Mint.

- U.S. Mint Director, appointed and endorsed by the Coinage Act of 1792, was authorized to contract and purchase a quantity of a group 11 element being pure or unalloyed copper. The coinage metal was to be defined as a federal standard having a consistency in uniformity and weight.
- Copper purchase quantity not to exceed a weight of 150 short tons (300,000 lb)
- Copper to be coined into cents as authorized by the Coinage Act of 1792
- U.S. Mint Director to publish when a monetary sum has been paid into the United States Treasury
- Forfeiture of copper planchets offered as milled coinage holding incredulous purchasing power which was not issued from the new foundry of the United States Mint

== Copper Coin Contract of 1787 ==
James Jarvis was a coin minter utilizing artistic repoussé and chasing techniques in Colonial America. In 1785, Abel Buell and James Jarvis established a currency mint in New Haven, Connecticut sustaining operations of milled coinage until 1788.

On April 21, 1787, the Continental Congress endorsed a contract for 300 short tons (600,000 lb) of copper coin being of federal standard from James Jarvis. The copper coinage was milled as the first standardized coin of Colonial America known as the Fugio cent.

Correspondence affirming a narrative concerning the Copper Coin Contract of 1787 with James Jarvis:

- Continental Congress (April 9, 1787). "Report of Board of Treasury on Proposals for Coining Copper". Journals of the Continental Congress, 1774-1789. XXXII (Monday, April 9, 1787). United States Library of Congress: 160–164. LCCN 05000059.
- Continental Congress (April 21, 1787). "Report on Copper Coinage of 1787" [Board of Treasury to contract copper coin of Federal standard from James Jarvis]. Journals of the Continental Congress, 1774-1789. XXXII (Saturday, April 21, 1787). United States Library of Congress: 223–225. LCCN 05000059.
- Broome, Samuel (August 13, 1788). "To Alexander Hamilton from Samuel Broome". Founders Online. U.S. National Archives and Records Administration.
- Board of Treasury (New York) (June 10, 1789). "To George Washington from the Board of Treasury". Founders Online. U.S. National Archives and Records Administration.
- Jarvis, James (February 10, 1790). "To Alexander Hamilton from James Jarvis". Founders Online. U.S. National Archives and Records Administration.
- Bailey, John (April 17, 1790). "To George Washington from John Bailey". Founders Online. U.S. National Archives and Records Administration.
- Jarvis, James (March 19, 1791). "To Alexander Hamilton from James Jarvis". Founders Online. U.S. National Archives and Records Administration.
- Bronson, M.D., Henry (1865). "A Historical Account of Connecticut Currency, Continental Money, and the Finances of the Revolution" [Chapter XIII: First United States Coinage ~ Connecticut Coppers]. Internet Archive. New Haven Colony Historical Society. pp. 175–182.
- Douglas, Damon G. (1949). "James Jarvis and the Fugio Coppers" [Unpublished Manuscript with Corrections]. Internet Archive. American Numismatic Society.

== Diplomatic correspondence concerning early American copper coinage ==
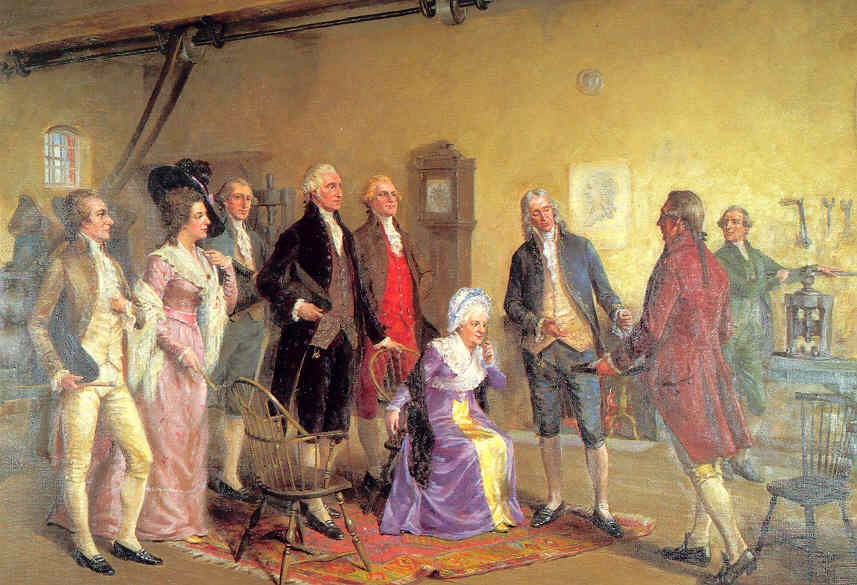
First coins of America July 13, 1792

- Bridgen, Edward (September 17, 1779). "To Benjamin Franklin from Edward Bridgen". Founders Online. U.S. National Archives and Records Administration.
- American Peace Commissioners (December 20, 1782). "The American Peace Commissioners to Robert R. Livingston". Founders Online. U.S. National Archives and Records Administration.
- Franklin, Benjamin (December 24, 1782). "From Benjamin Franklin to Robert R. Livingston". Founders Online. U.S. National Archives and Records Administration.
- Fitch, John; Voigt, Henry (February 26, 1790). "To George Washington from John Fitch and Henry Voigt". Founders Online. U.S. National Archives and Records Administration.
- Mitchell, John H. (March 22, 1790). "John H. Mitchell to Thomas Tudor Tucker". Founders Online. U.S. National Archives and Records Administration.
- Jefferson, Thomas (April 14, 1790). "Editorial Note: Report on Copper Coinage". Founders Online. U.S. National Archives and Records Administration.

== See also ==
- Copper Panic of 1789
- Philadelphia Mint
- Higley copper
- Vermont copper
- Bullion
- Hôtel des Monnaies, Paris
- Matthew Boulton
- James Watt
- Jean-Pierre Droz
- Committee of Five
- John Bailey
- Tench Coxe
- Continental Committee for United States Copper Coinage
  - William Samuel Johnson
  - Rufus King
  - William Pierce
  - Abraham Clark
  - Charles Pettit
