= Copper Panic of 1789 =

1789 monetary crisis in the United States

The Copper Panic of 1789 was a monetary crisis of the early United States that was caused by debasement and loss of confidence in copper coins that occurred under the presidency of George Washington. Following the American Revolutionary War, several U.S. states began minting their own coins, largely using copper. As copper was relatively easy to counterfeit, counterfeiters in states which were minting coins began to produce counterfeit currency, which forced minters to debase their coins in order to remain in business. This occurred at a time when the Washington administration had only recently been formed, and the lack of the existence of a Department of the Treasury and collapse in the value of colonial and confederation-era coins only compounded the problems facing the new administration.

As more counterfeiters produced counterfeit copper coins, the value of copper began to fall. Several laws were passed during this time period, including the prohibiting of debased coins from being considered legal tender. The State of New York prohibited the circulation of copper coins entirely. The State of New Jersey in 1787 declared it would no longer accept any legal tender of other states for any debts. This furthered the decline in copper prices, forcing many minters to shut down, leaving only counterfeiters who produced extremely low quality coins.

By 1789, the market was completely flooded with debased copper coins that were officially illegal and thus caused the citizens to lose all confidence in them. The Federal government attempted to value them at 48 coppers to the shilling, but merchants refused to cooperate and the coins became almost entirely worthless. At the height of the debasement, there was a 430% inflation rate for copper and commerce ceased, forcing several businesses and manufacturers to close down.

The situation was alleviated when the Bank of Philadelphia ― Second Bank of the United States ― began issuing paper bank notes to replace the copper coins. State governments sought to cooperate with the plan and thus established the small fiat currency as an active medium of trade. With stability returning to the economy the value of copper also rose again, until it was almost back to normal values in most areas. Commerce began to flourish again as the monetary system had confidence restored. This event was largely a factor for the federal government establishing a stronger federal currency standard and initiating more federal taxes to empower a central authority.

== See also ==
• Higley copper	• Numismatic history of the United States
• Gresham's law	• Vermont copper
• Hammered coinage	• Thomas Machin's Mint
• Milled coinage

Cooper Coinage of Colonial America
◇ Nova Constellatio (1783)	◇ Wreath cent (1793)
◇ Fugio cent (1787)	◇ Flowing Hair cent (1793)
◇ Chain cent (1793)	◇ Coronet large cent (1816)
