= Presidency of George Washington =

U.S. presidential administration from 1789 to 1797

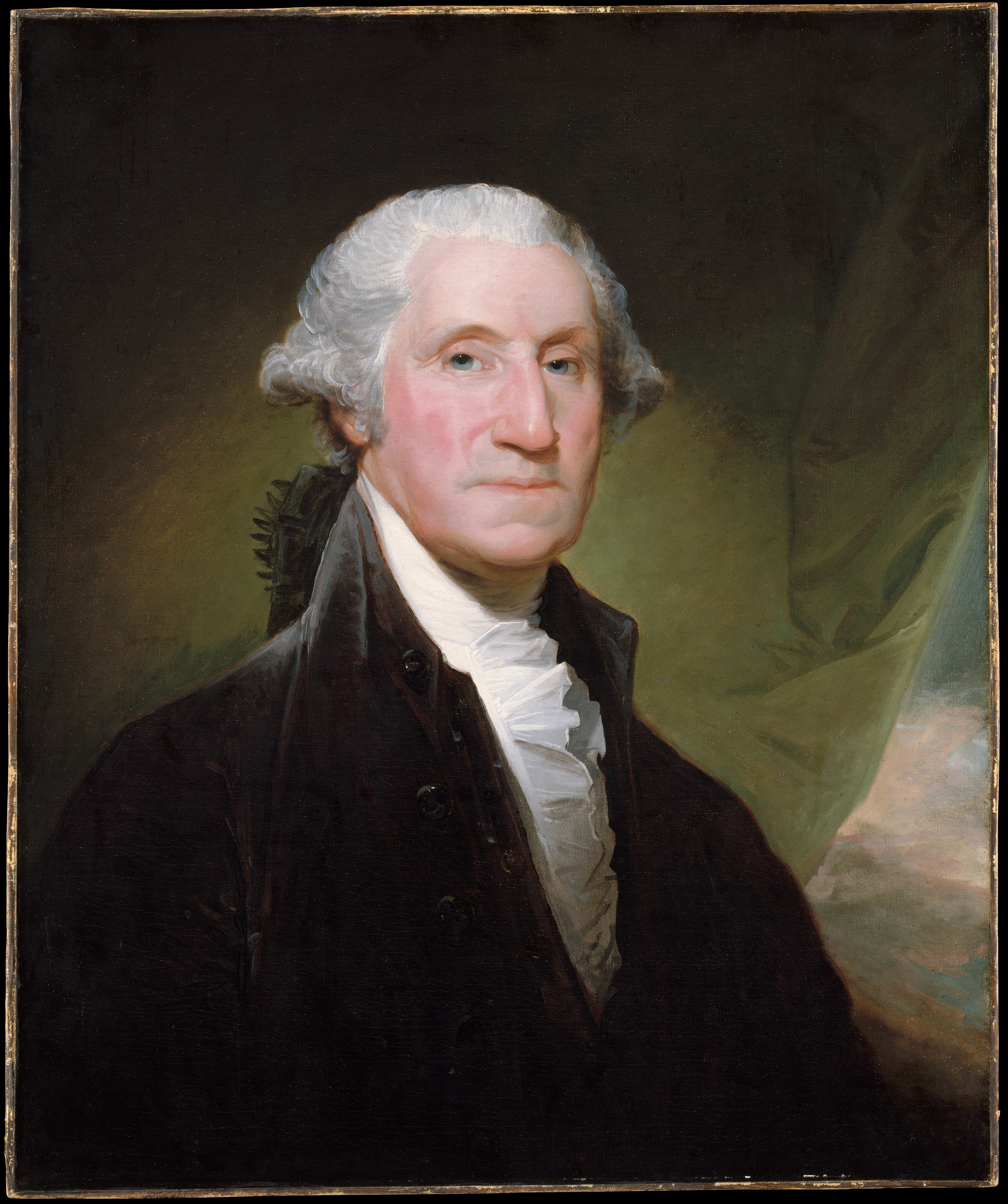
- Gibbs-Channing-Avery Portrait by Gilbert Stuart, 1795
- Presidency of George Washington; April 30, 1789 – March 4, 1797
- Vice President: John Adams
- Cabinet: See list
- Party: Independent
- Election: 1788–1789; 1792
- Seat: Samuel Osgood House; Alexander Macomb House; President's House
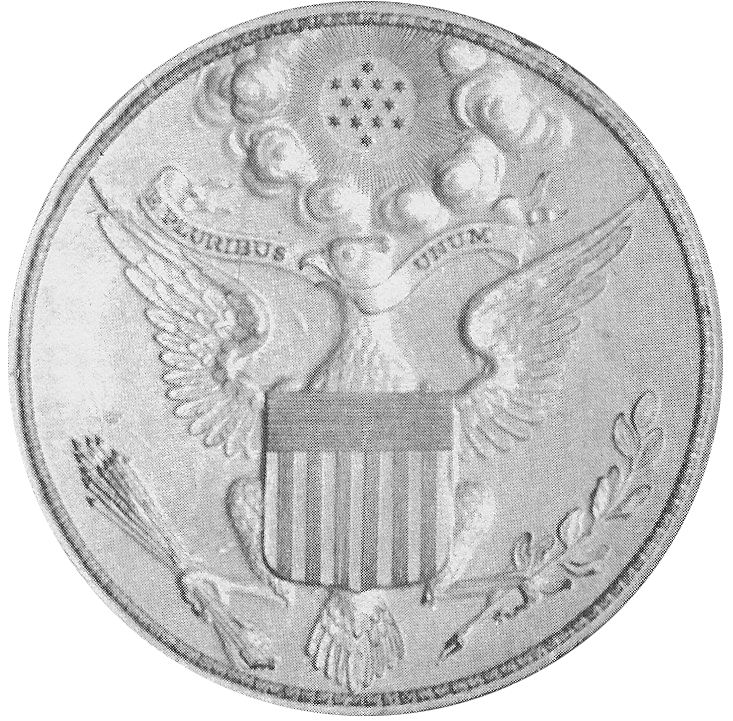
- Dorsett seal

George Washington's tenure as the inaugural president of the United States began on April 30, 1789, the day of his first inauguration, and ended on March 4, 1797. Washington took office after he was elected unanimously by the Electoral College in the 1788–1789 presidential election, the nation's first quadrennial presidential election. Washington was re-elected unanimously in 1792 and chose to retire after two terms. He was succeeded by his vice president, John Adams of the Federalist Party.

Washington, who had established his preeminence among the new nation's Founding Fathers through his service as Commander-in-Chief of the Continental Army during the American Revolutionary War and as president of the 1787 constitutional convention, was widely expected to become the first president of the United States under the new Constitution, though he desired to retire from public life. In his first inaugural address, Washington expressed both his reluctance to accept the presidency and his inexperience with the duties of civil administration, though he proved an able leader.

He presided over the establishment of the new federal government, appointing all of the high-ranking officials in the executive and judicial branches, shaping numerous political practices, and establishing the site of the permanent capital of the United States. He supported Alexander Hamilton's economic policies whereby the federal government assumed the debts of the state governments and established the First Bank of the United States, the United States Mint, and the United States Customs Service. Congress passed the Tariff of 1789, the Tariff of 1790, and an excise tax on whiskey to fund the government and, in the case of the tariffs, address the trade imbalance with Britain.

Washington personally led federalized soldiers in suppressing the Whiskey Rebellion, which arose in opposition to the administration's taxation policies. He directed the Northwest Indian War, which saw the United States establish control over Native American tribes in the Northwest Territory. In foreign affairs, he assured domestic tranquility and maintained peace with the European powers despite the raging French Revolutionary Wars by issuing the 1793 Proclamation of Neutrality. He also secured two important bilateral treaties, the 1794 Jay Treaty with Great Britain and the 1795 Treaty of San Lorenzo with Spain, both of which fostered trade and helped secure control of the American frontier. To protect American shipping from Barbary pirates and other threats, he re-established the United States Navy with the Naval Act of 1794.

Greatly concerned about the growing partisanship within the government and the detrimental impact political parties could have on the fragile unity of the nation, Washington struggled throughout his eight-year presidency to hold rival factions together. He was, and remains, the only U.S. president never to be formally affiliated with a political party. Despite his efforts, debates over Hamilton's economic policy, the French Revolution, and the Jay Treaty deepened ideological divisions. Those who supported Hamilton formed the Federalist Party, while his opponents coalesced around Secretary of State Thomas Jefferson and formed the Democratic-Republican Party. While criticized for furthering the partisanship he sought to avoid by identifying himself with Hamilton, Washington is nonetheless considered by scholars and political historians as one of the greatest presidents in American history, usually ranking in the top three with Abraham Lincoln and Franklin D. Roosevelt.

== Election of 1788–1789 ==
Following the Philadelphia Constitutional Convention of 1787, a fatigued Washington returned to his estate in Virginia, Mount Vernon. He seemed intent on resuming his retirement and letting others govern the nation with its new frame of government. The American public at large, however, wanted Washington to be the nation's first president. The first U.S. presidential campaign was in essence what today would be called a grassroots effort to convince Washington to accept the office. Letters poured into Mount Vernon – from the people, from former comrades in arms, and from across the Atlantic – informing him of public sentiment and imploring him to accept. Gouverneur Morris urged Washington to accept, writing "[Among the] thirteen horses now about to be coupled together, there are some of every race and character. They will listen to your voice and submit to your control. You therefore must, I say must mount this seat." Alexander Hamilton was one of the most dedicated in his efforts to get Washington to accept the presidency, as he foresaw himself receiving a powerful position in the administration. The comte de Rochambeau urged Washington to accept, as did the Marquis de Lafayette, who exhorted Washington "not to deny your acceptance of the office of President for the first years." Washington replied, "Let those follow the pursuits of ambition and fame, who have a keener relish for them, or who may have more years, in-store, for the enjoyment." In an October 1788 letter, Washington further expounded on his feelings regarding the election, stating,

I should unfeignedly rejoice, in case the Electors, by giving their votes to another person would save me from the dreaded dilemma of being forced to accept or refuse... If that may not be–I am, in the next place, earnestly desirous of searching out the truth, and knowing whether there does not exist a probability that the government would be just as happily and effectually carried into execution without my aid."

Less certain was the choice for the vice presidency, which contained little definitive job description in the constitution. The only official role of the vice president was as the president of the United States Senate, a duty unrelated to the executive branch. The Constitution stipulated that the position would be awarded to the runner-up in the presidential election, or the person with the second highest number of electoral votes. Being from Virginia, Washington (who remained neutral on the candidates) assumed that a vice president would be chosen from Massachusetts to ease sectional tensions. In an August 1788 letter, Thomas Jefferson wrote that he considered John Adams, John Hancock, John Jay, James Madison, and John Rutledge to be contenders for the vice presidency. In January 1789, upon hearing that Adams would probably win the vice presidency, Washington wrote to Henry Knox, saying "[I am] entirely satisfied with the arrangement for filling the second office."

Each state's presidential electors gathered in their state's capital on February 4, 1789, to cast their votes for the president. As the election occurred before ratification of the Twelfth Amendment, each elector cast two votes for the presidency, though the electors were not allowed to cast both votes for the same person. Under the terms of the constitution, the individual who won the most electoral votes would become president while the individual with the second-most electoral votes would become vice president. Each state's votes were sealed and delivered to Congress to be counted. (Note: Only ten of the thirteen states cast electoral votes in this election. North Carolina and Rhode Island did not participate as they had not yet ratified the Constitution. The New York legislature failed to appoint its allotted electors in time, so there were no voting electors from New York.)

Before the votes were counted, Washington had declared his willingness to serve and was preparing to leave Mount Vernon for New York City, the nation's temporary capital. On April 6, 1789, the House and Senate, meeting in joint session, counted the electoral votes and certified that Washington had been elected President of the United States with 69 electoral votes. They also certified that Adams, with 34 electoral votes, had been elected as vice president. The other 35 electoral votes were scattered. Informed of his election on April 14, Washington wrote in a letter to Edward Rutledge that in accepting the presidency, he had given up "all expectations of private happiness in this world."

== Start of first presidential and vice-presidential terms ==
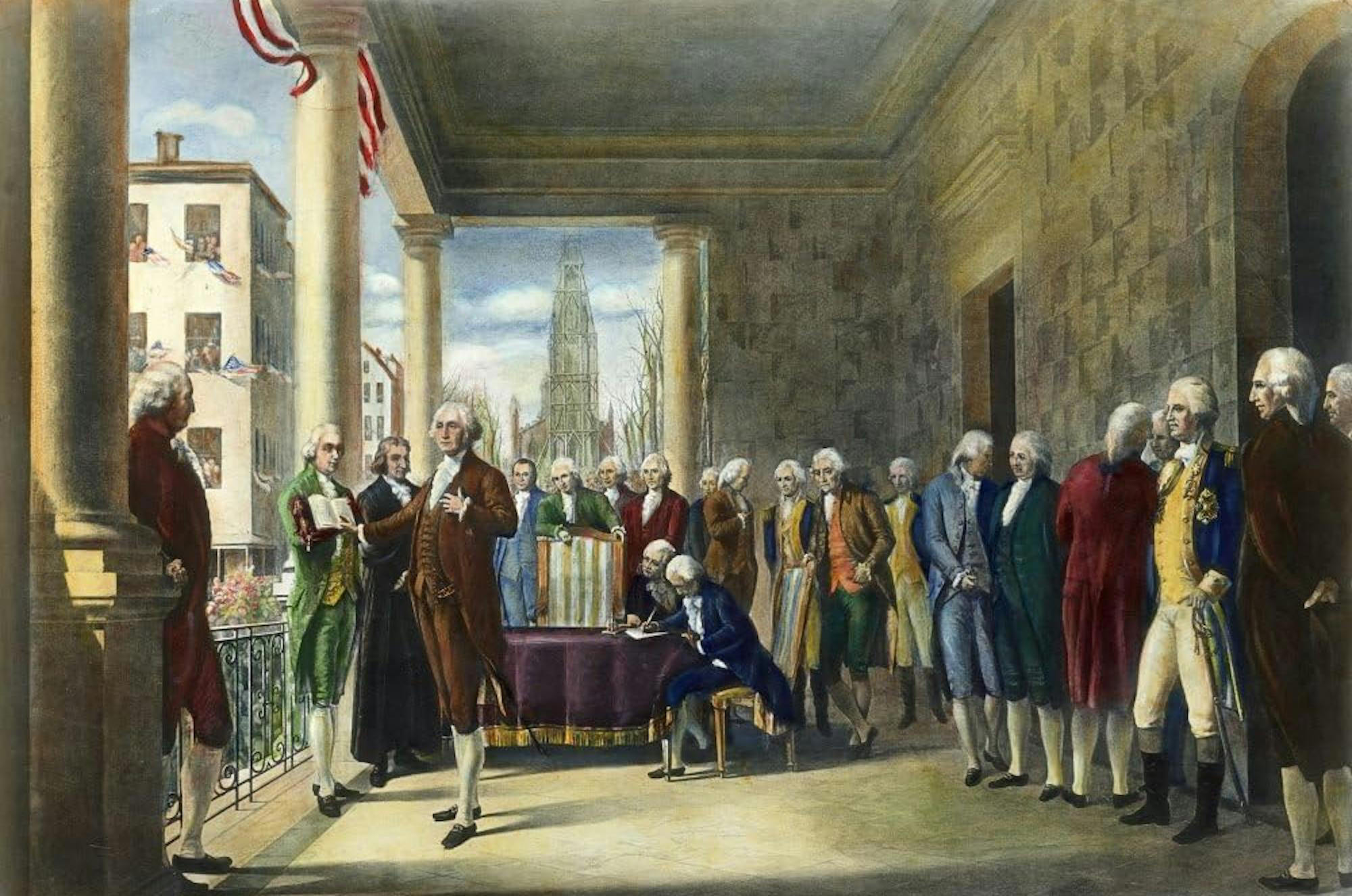
Washington's first inauguration, April 30, 1789, Federal Hall, New York City

The Congress of the Confederation had set March 4, 1789, as the date for the beginning of operations of the new federal government under the new Constitution. Owing to the formidable difficulties of long-distance travel in 18th-century America, Congress was unable to reach a quorum until April. The House finally achieved a quorum on April 1, and the Senate on April 6, at which time the electoral votes were counted. Washington and Adams were certified as elected.

Adams arrived in New York on April 20 and was inaugurated as vice president on the next day. On his way to New York City, Washington received triumphal welcomes in almost every town he passed through, including Alexandria, Virginia; Georgetown, Maryland; Baltimore; Philadelphia; and Trenton. He arrived in New York City on April 23, where he was greeted by New York Governor George Clinton as well as many congressmen and citizens. Washington was inaugurated as the first President of the United States on April 30, 1789, at Federal Hall in New York, then the nation's capitol. As judges of the federal courts had not yet been appointed, the presidential oath of office was administered by Chancellor Robert Livingston, the highest judicial officer in the state of New York. Washington took the oath on the building's second-floor balcony, because of throngs of people gathered on the streets. The Bible used in the ceremony was from St. John's Lodge No. 1, Ancient York Masons, and was opened at random to Genesis 49:13 ("Zebulun shall dwell at the haven of the sea; and he shall be for an haven of ships; and his border shall be unto Zidon"). Afterward, Livingston shouted "Long live George Washington, President of the United States!" Historian John Richard Alden indicates that Washington added the words "so help me God" to the oath prescribed by the Constitution.

In his inaugural address, Washington again touched upon his reluctance to accept the presidency.

== Election of 1792 ==
As the presidential election of 1792 approached, Washington, pleased with the progress his administration had made in establishing a strong, stable federal government, hoped to retire rather than seek a second term. He complained of old age, sickness, the in-fighting plaguing his cabinet, and the increasing hostility of the partisan press. The members of his cabinet—especially Jefferson and Hamilton—worked diligently through the summer and autumn to persuade Washington not to retire. They apprised him of the potential impact the French Revolutionary Wars might have on the country and insisted that only someone with his popularity and moderation could lead the nation effectively during the volatile times ahead. In the end, "Washington never announced his candidacy in the election of 1792," wrote John Ferling in his book on Washington, "he simply never said that he would not consider a second term."

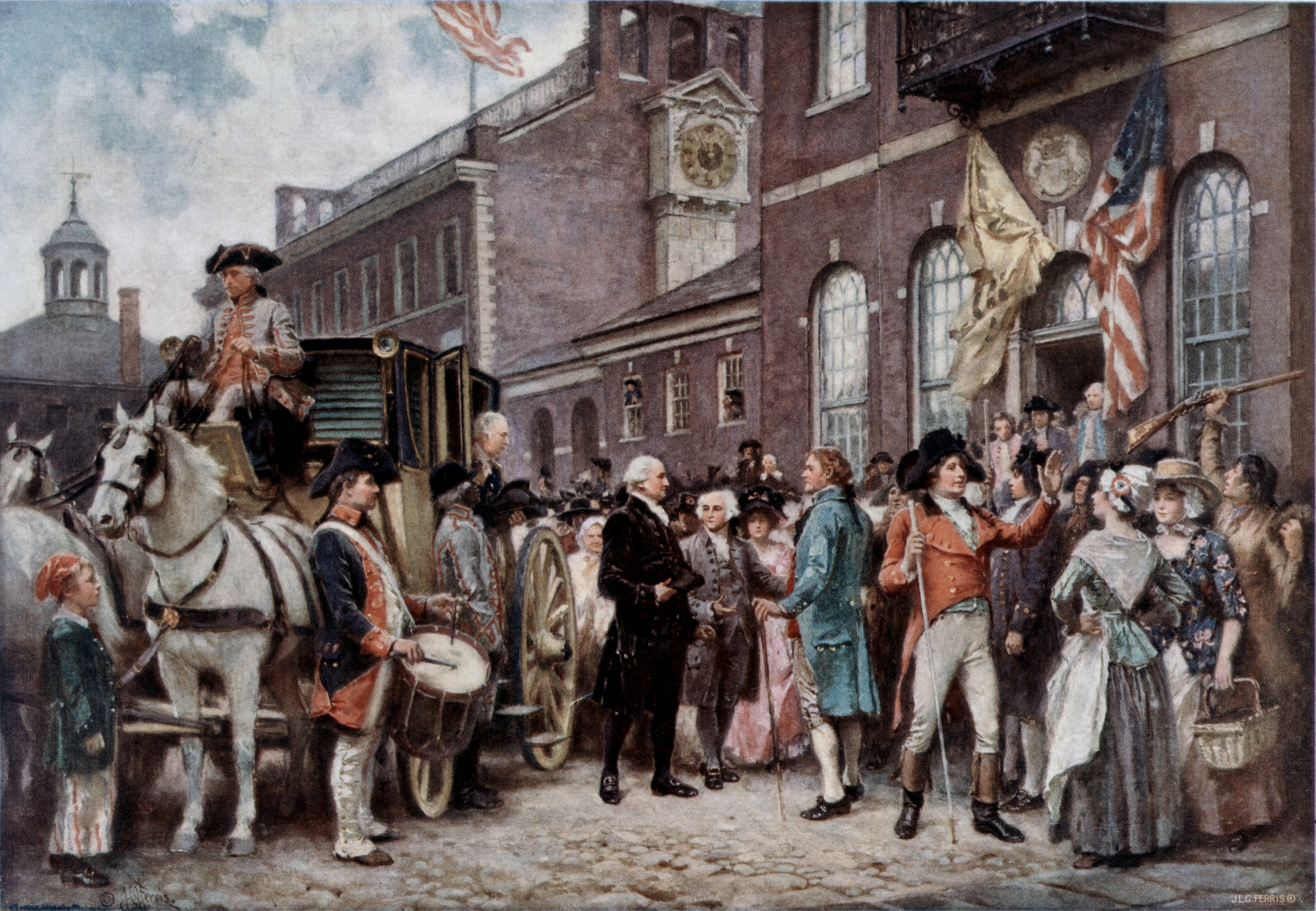
Washington arriving at Congress Hall in Philadelphia to take the presidential oath of office for the second time, March 4, 1793

The 1792 elections were the first ones in U.S. history to be contested on anything resembling a partisan basis. In most states, the congressional elections were recognized in some sense as a "struggle between the Treasury Department and the republican interest", as Jefferson strategist John Beckley wrote. Because few doubted that Washington would receive the greatest number of electoral votes, the vice presidency became the focus of popular attention. The speculation here also tended to be organized along partisan lines – Hamiltonians supported Adams and Jeffersonians favored New York governor George Clinton. Both were technically candidates for president competing against Washington, as electoral rules of the time required each presidential elector to cast two votes without distinguishing which was for president and which for vice president. The recipient of the most votes would then become president, and the runner-up vice president.

Washington was unanimously re-elected president, receiving 132 electoral votes (one from each elector), and Adams was re-elected vice president, receiving 77 votes. The other 55 electoral votes were divided among: George Clinton (50), Thomas Jefferson (4), and Aaron Burr (1).

Washington's second inauguration took place in the Senate Chamber of Congress Hall in Philadelphia, Pennsylvania, on March 4, 1793. The presidential oath of office was administered by Supreme Court associate justice William Cushing. Washington's inaugural address was just 135 words, the shortest ever. The short and simple inauguration was viewed in a stark contrast to that of 1789, which was perceived by many as almost a monarchical coronation.

Although his second term began simultaneously with Washington's, John Adams was sworn into office for that term on December 2, 1793, when the Senate reconvened, in the Senate Chamber of Congress Hall. The vice-presidential oath was administered by the president pro tempore of the Senate John Langdon.

== Administration ==
=== Cabinet ===
Washington cabinet
Office	Name	Term
President	George Washington	1789–1797
Vice President	John Adams	1789–1797
Secretary of State	John Jay (acting)	1789–1790
Thomas Jefferson	1790–1793
Edmund Randolph	1794–1795
Timothy Pickering	1795–1797
Secretary of the Treasury	Alexander Hamilton	1789–1795
Oliver Wolcott Jr.	1795–1797
Secretary of War	Henry Knox	1789–1794
Timothy Pickering	1795
James McHenry	1796–1797
Attorney General	Edmund Randolph	1789–1794
William Bradford	1794–1795
Charles Lee	1795–1797

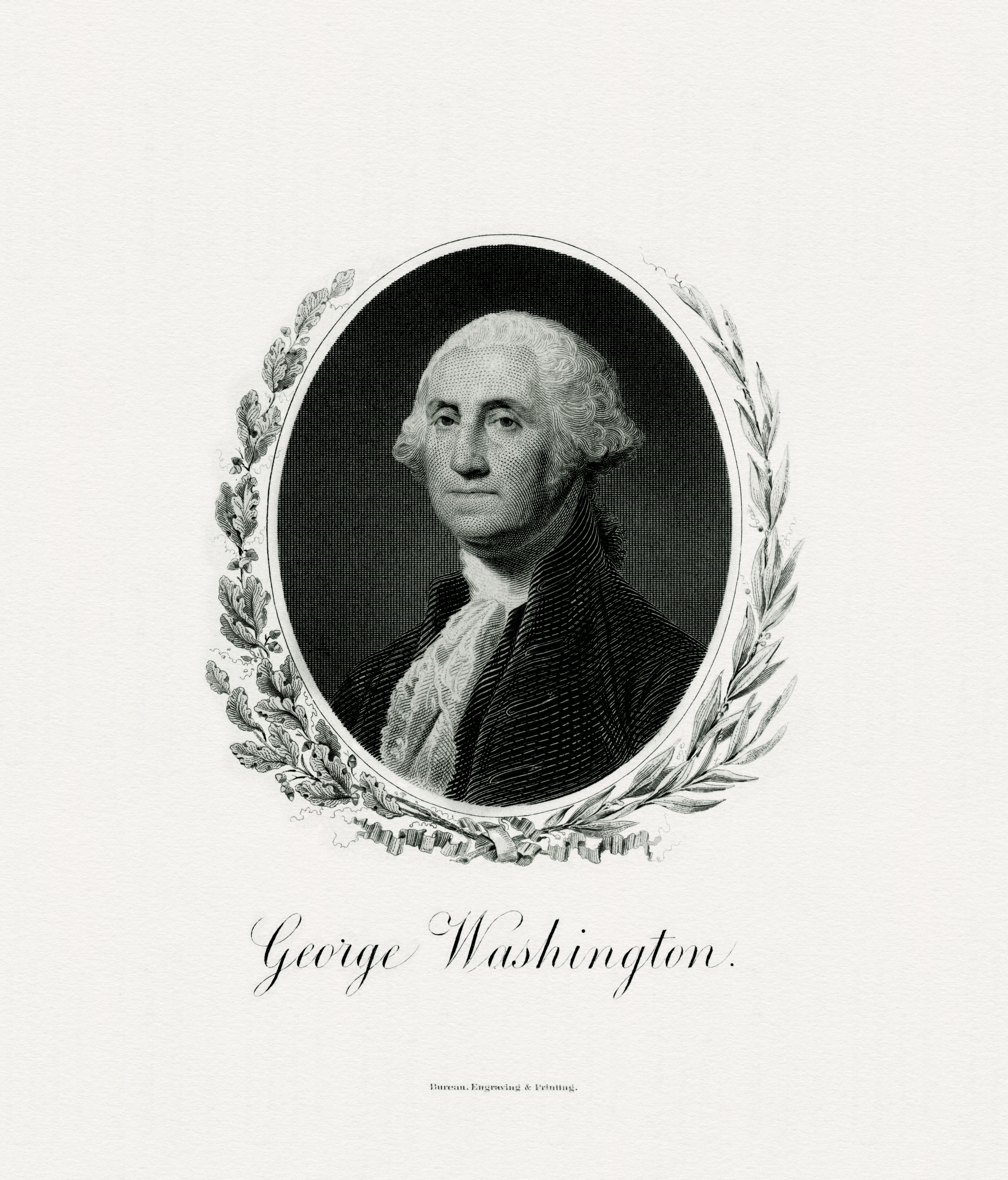
BEP engraved portrait of Washington as President

The new Constitution empowered the president to appoint executive department heads with the consent of the Senate. Three departments had existed under the Articles of Confederation: the Department of War, the Ministry of Foreign Affairs, and the Finance Office. The Ministry of Foreign Affairs was re-established on July 27, 1789, and would be renamed to the Department of State in September. The Department of War was retained on August 7, while the Finance Office was renamed as the Department of the Treasury on September 2. Congress also considered establishing a Home Department to oversee Native American affairs, the preservation of government documents, and other matters, but the proposed department's duties were instead folded into the State Department. In September 1789, Congress established the positions of attorney general, to serve as the chief legal adviser to the president; and postmaster general, to serve as the head of the postal service. (Note: The Attorney General would not lead an executive department until the establishment of the Department of Justice in 1870, and the Postmaster-General would not become a cabinet-level position until 1829.) Initially, Washington met individually with the leaders of the executive departments and the Attorney General, but he began to hold joint meetings in 1791, with the first meeting occurring on November 26. The four positions of secretary of war, secretary of state, secretary of the treasury, and attorney general became collectively known as the cabinet, and Washington held regular cabinet meetings throughout his second term.

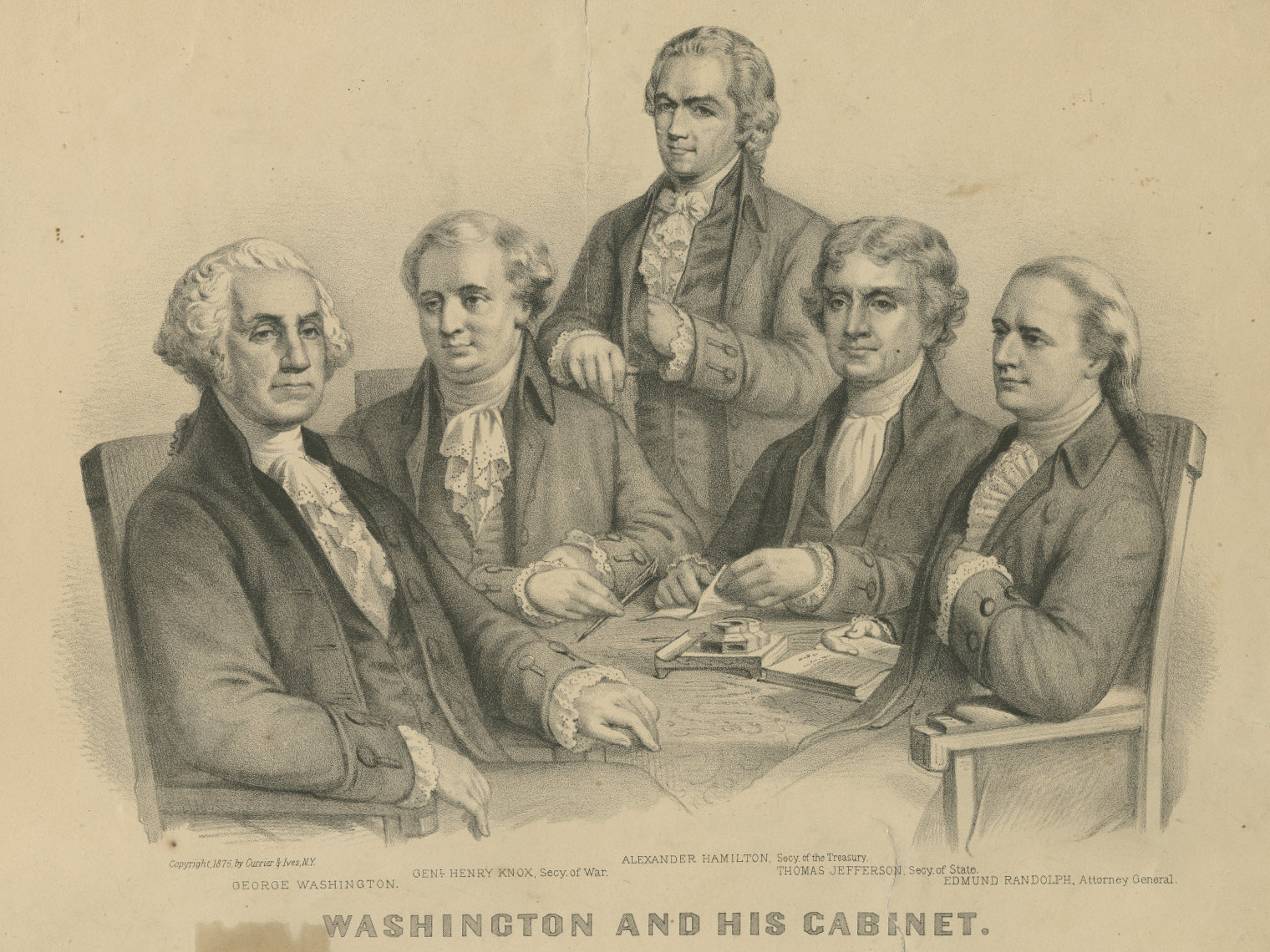
Washington and his cabinet. From left to right George Washington, Henry Knox, Alexander Hamilton, Thomas Jefferson, and Edmund Randolph

Edmund Randolph became the first attorney general, while Henry Knox retained his position as head of the Department of War. Washington initially offered the position of secretary of state to John Jay, who had served as the secretary of foreign affairs since 1784 and acted as the interim Secretary of State. After Jay expressed his preference for a judicial appointment, Washington selected Thomas Jefferson as the first permanent secretary of state. For the key post of secretary of the Treasury, which would oversee economic policy, Washington chose Alexander Hamilton, after his first choice, Robert Morris, declined. Morris had recommended Hamilton instead, writing "But, my dear general, you will be no loser by my declining the secretaryship of the Treasury, for I can recommend a far cleverer fellow than I am for your minister of finance in the person of your aide-de-camp, Colonel Hamilton." Washington's initial cabinet consisted of one individual from New England (Knox), one individual from the Mid-Atlantic (Hamilton), and two Southerners (Jefferson and Randolph).

Washington considered himself to be an expert in both foreign affairs and the Department of War, and as such, according to Forrest McDonald, "he was in practice his own Foreign Secretary and War Secretary." Jefferson left the cabinet at the end of 1793, and was replaced by Randolph, while William Bradford took over as attorney general. Like Jefferson, Randolph tended to favor the French in foreign affairs, but he held very little influence in the cabinet. Knox, Hamilton, and Randolph all left the cabinet during Washington's second term; Randolph was forced to resign during the debate over the Jay Treaty. Timothy Pickering succeeded Knox as secretary of war, while Oliver Wolcott Jr. became secretary of the treasury and Charles Lee took the position of attorney general. In 1795, Pickering became the secretary of state, and James McHenry replaced Pickering as secretary of war.

Hamilton and Jefferson had the greatest impact on cabinet deliberations during Washington's first term. Their deep philosophical differences set them against each other from the outset, and they frequently sparred over economic and foreign policy issues. With Jefferson's departure, Hamilton came to dominate the cabinet, and he remained very influential within the administration even after he left the cabinet during Washington's second term to practice law in New York City.

=== Vice presidency ===
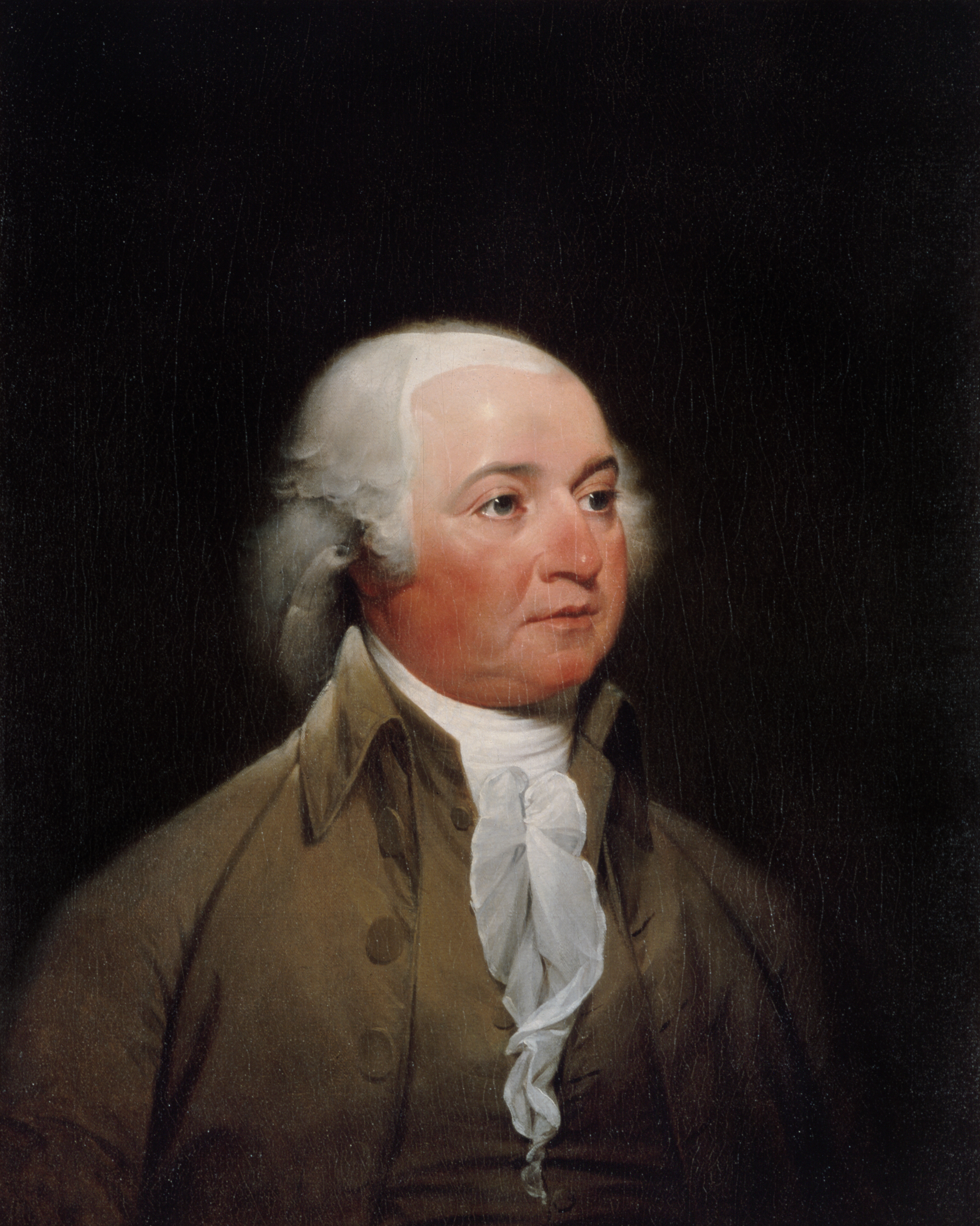
Vice President John Adams by John Trumbull

During his two vice-presidential terms, Adams attended few cabinet meetings, and the President sought his counsel only infrequently. Nonetheless, the two men, according to Adams biographer, John E. Ferling, "jointly executed many more of the executive branch's ceremonial undertakings than would be likely for a contemporary president and vice-president." In the Senate, Adams played a more active role, particularly during his first term. He often participated in debates in the Senate. On at least one occasion, Adams persuaded senators to vote against legislation he opposed, and he frequently lectured the body on procedural and policy matters. He cast 29 tie-breaking votes.

His first incursion into the legislative realm occurred shortly after he assumed office, during the Senate debates over titles for the president and executive officers of the new government. Although the House of Representatives agreed in short order that the president should be addressed simply as George Washington, President of the United States, the Senate debated the issue at some length. Adams favored the adoption of the style of Highness (as well as the title of Protector of Their [the United States'] Liberties) for the president. Others favored the variant of Electoral Highness or the lesser Excellency. Anti-federalists objected to the monarchical sound of them all. All but three senators eventually agreed upon His Highness the President of the United States and Protector of the Rights of the Same. In the end, Washington yielded to the various objections and the House decided that the title of "Mr. President" would be used. In practice, however, he was very frequently addressed as "Your Excellency" by Americans and foreign visitors.

While Adams brought energy and dedication to the presiding officer's chair, he found the task "not quite adapted to my character." Ever cautious about going beyond the constitutional limits of the vice-presidency or of encroaching upon presidential prerogative, Adams often ended up lamenting what he viewed as the "complete insignificance" of his situation. To his wife Abigail he wrote, "My country has in its wisdom contrived for me the most insignificant office that ever the invention of man . . . or his imagination contrived or his imagination conceived; and as I can do neither good nor evil, I must be borne away by others and meet the common fate."

=== First presidential veto ===
The Constitution granted the president the power to veto legislation, but Washington was reluctant to encroach on legislative affairs, and he only exercised his veto power twice. He exercised his presidential veto power for the first time on April 5, 1792, to stop an apportionment act from becoming law. The bill would have redistributed House seats among the states in a way that Washington considered unconstitutional. After attempting but failing to override the veto, Congress soon wrote new legislation, the Apportionment Act of 1792, which Washington signed into law on April 14.

=== Salary ===
On September 24, 1789, Congress voted to pay the president a salary of $25,000 a year, and the vice president an annual salary of $5,000. Washington's salary was equal to two percent of the total federal budget in 1789.

== Judicial appointments ==
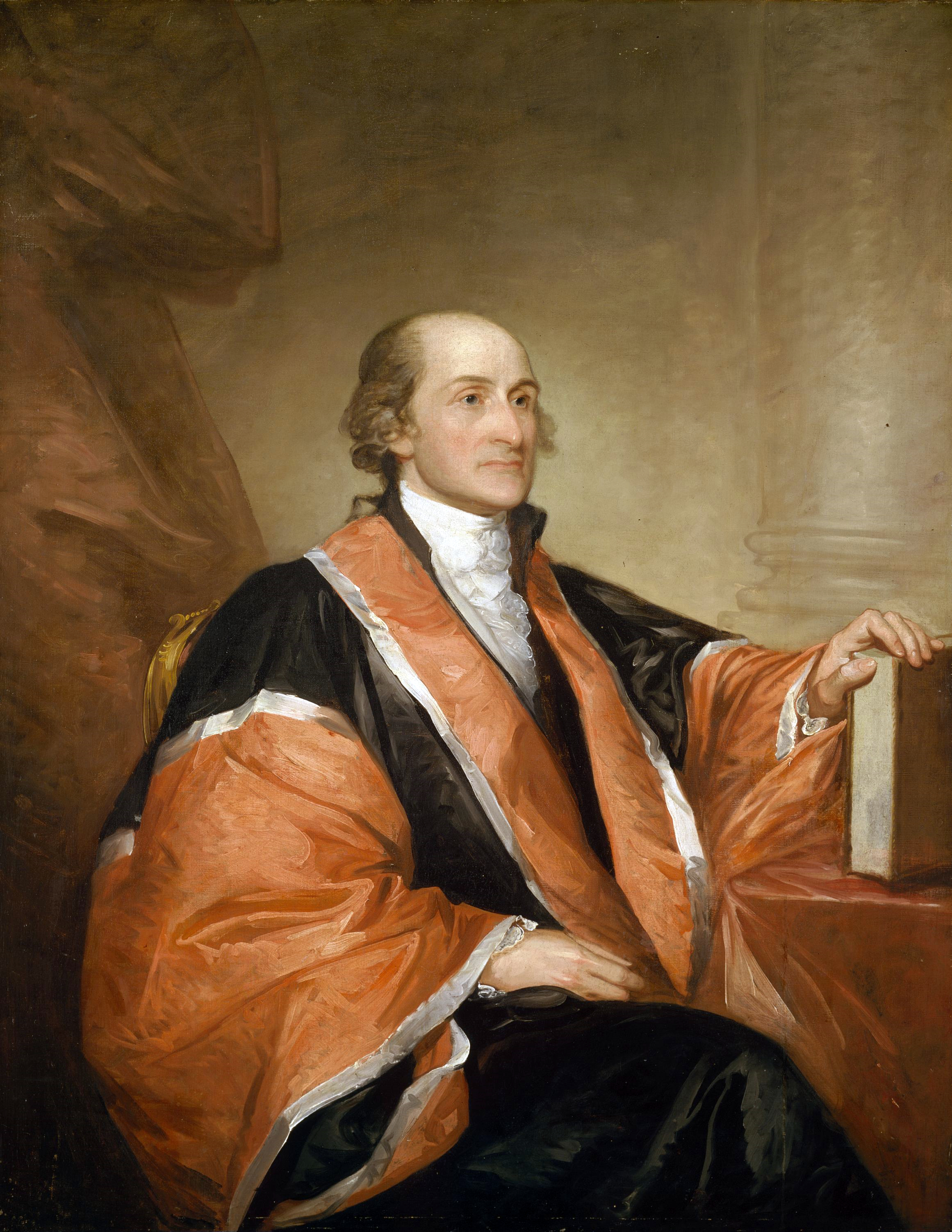
John Jay, first Chief Justice of the United States

Article Three of the Constitution established the judicial branch of the federal government but left several issues to the discretion of Congress or the president. Unresolved issues included the size of the Supreme Court, the identity of the first Supreme Court Justices, the number and establishment of federal courts below the Supreme Court, and the relationship between state and federal courts. In September 1789, Congress passed the Judiciary Act of 1789, primarily written by Connecticut senator Oliver Ellsworth. Through the Judiciary Act, Congress established a six-member Supreme Court, composed of one chief justice and five associate justices. The act also created thirteen judicial districts, along with district courts and circuit courts for each district.

As the first president, Washington was responsible for appointing the entire Supreme Court. As such, he filled more vacancies on the Court than any other president in American history. On September 24, 1789, Washington nominated John Jay as the first chief justice and nominated John Rutledge, William Cushing, James Wilson, John Blair Jr., and Robert Harrison as associate justices. All were quickly confirmed by the Senate, but after Harrison declined the appointment, Washington appointed James Iredell in 1790. The Court's first term began on February 2, 1790, at the Royal Exchange in New York City. With no cases on the docket and little pressing business (a few procedural matters decided and 26 attorneys and counselors admitted to the federal bar), the term lasted for only eight days.

As Associate Justices left the court in subsequent years, Washington appointed Thomas Johnson, William Paterson, and Samuel Chase. Jay stepped down as chief justice in 1795 and was replaced by Rutledge, who received a recess appointment as chief justice. Rutledge served for six months but resigned after his nomination was rejected by the Senate in December 1795; Rutledge had alienated several Senators with his criticism of the Jay Treaty. (Note: Rutledge was the first Supreme Court nominee to be rejected, and is the only "recess appointed" justice not to be subsequently confirmed by the Senate.) After the rejection of Rutledge's nomination, Washington appointed Oliver Ellsworth as the third Chief Justice of the United States.

The Judiciary Act also created 13 judicial districts within the 11 states that had then ratified the Constitution, with Massachusetts and Virginia each being divided into two districts. Both North Carolina and Rhode Island were added as judicial districts in 1790 after they ratified the Constitution, as were the subsequent states that Congress admitted to the Union. The act also established circuit courts and district courts within these districts. The circuit courts, which were composed of a district judge and (initially) two Supreme Court justices "riding circuit", had jurisdiction over more serious crimes and civil cases and appellate jurisdiction over the district courts, while the single-judge district courts had jurisdiction primarily over admiralty cases, along with petty crimes and lawsuits involving smaller claims. The circuit courts were grouped into three geographic circuits to which justices were assigned on a rotating basis. Washington appointed 38 judges to the federal district courts during his two terms in office.

== Domestic affairs ==
Domestic affairs under Washington addressed far-ranging issues which included the selection of a permanent U.S. capital, the passing of the Tariff of 1789, administration of the Hamiltonian economics program, curtailment of the Whiskey Rebellion, assessing the rise of party politics in federal government, the passage of several constitutional amendments including the Bill of Rights, as well as continuing debate concerning the issues of slavery and responsible policies concerning expansion into Native American territory.

=== Selection of permanent U.S. capital ===
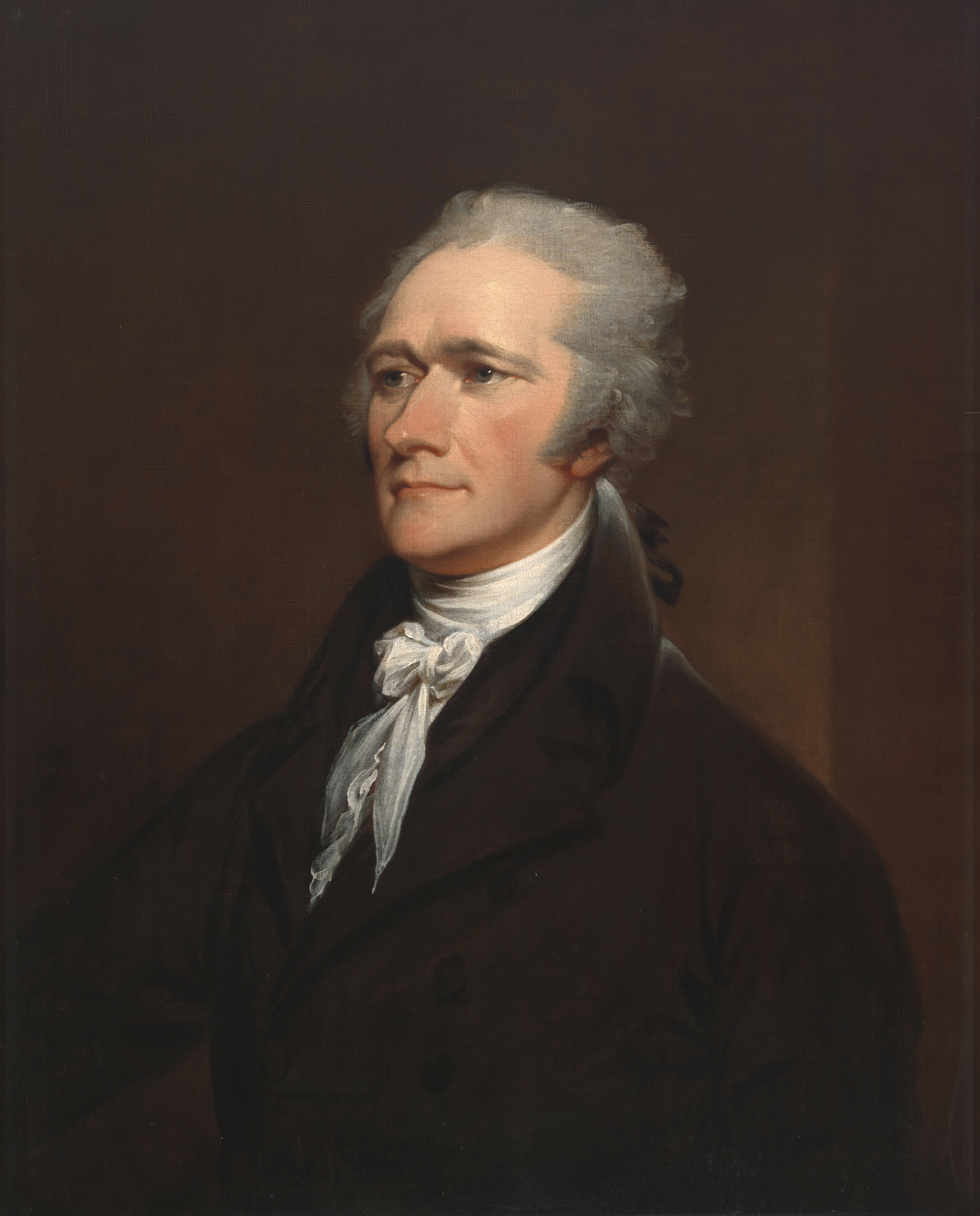
Secretary of the Treasury Alexander Hamilton

The subject of a permanent capital city had been discussed several times, but the Continental Congress could never agree on a site due to regional loyalties and tensions. New York City had served as the nation's temporary capital since 1785 but had never been intended to serve as a permanent capital. The city made numerous improvements in preparation for the new government, and the old City Hall was remodeled by Pierre L'Enfant to become Federal Hall. The Constitution said nothing about where the permanent capital would be. Interest in attracting the capital grew as people realized the commercial benefits and prestige that were at stake. There was much maneuvering by interstate coalitions that were formed and dissolved almost daily, as Congress debated the matter. More than 30 locations, including the Hudson Valley; Trenton, New Jersey; Wilmington, Delaware; Baltimore, Maryland; Norfolk, Virginia; and several locations in Pennsylvania, were proposed as the site of the capital. In 1789, discussions narrowed to a site on the Potomac River near Georgetown, a site on the Susquehanna River near Wrights Ferry (now Columbia, Pennsylvania), and a site on the Delaware River near Germantown, Pennsylvania. Both Pennsylvania sites nearly won congressional approval as the site of the permanent capital, but divisions between Pennsylvania's two senators, along with deft maneuvering by Congressman James Madison, postponed consideration of the topic into 1790.

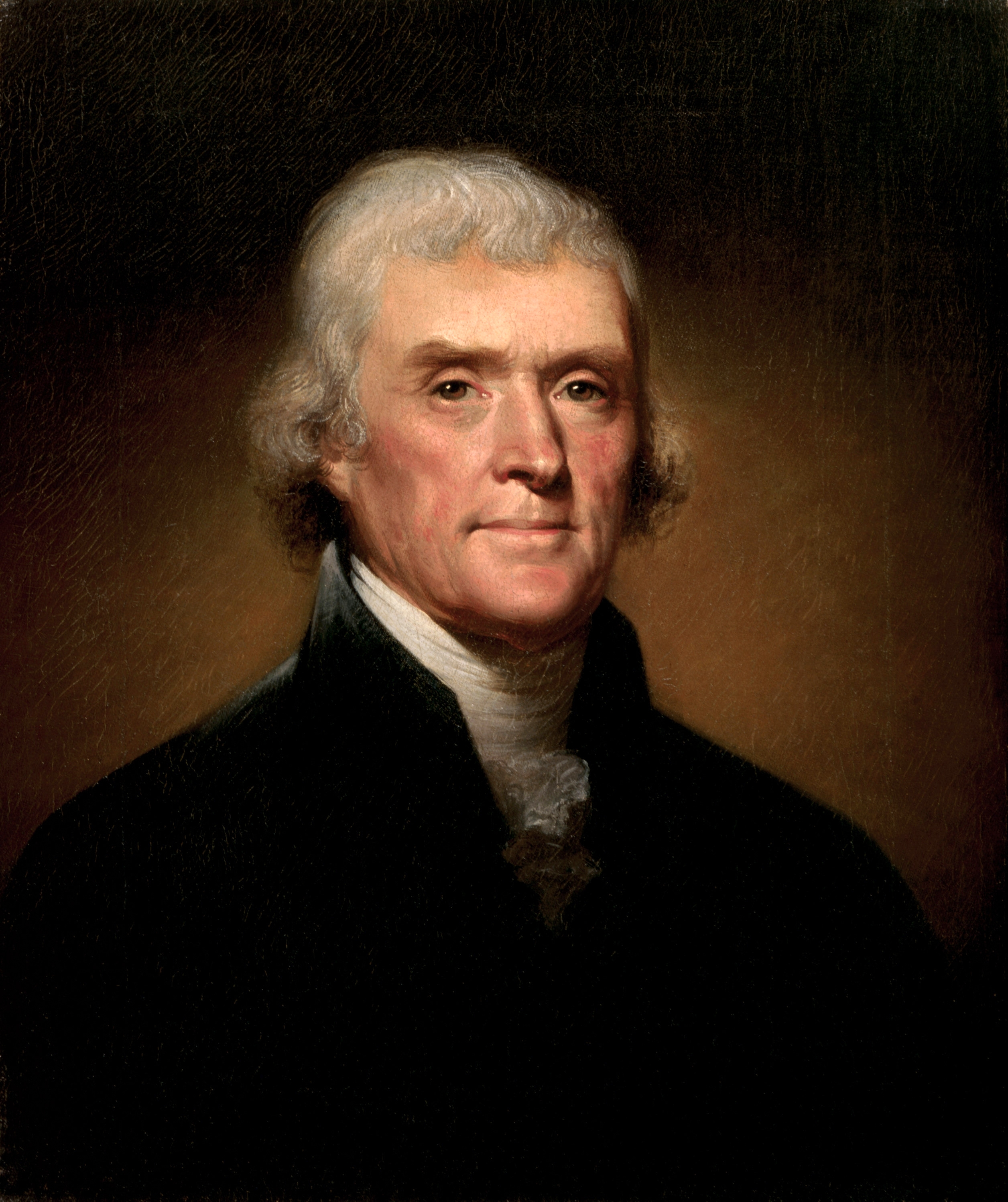
Secretary of State Thomas Jefferson

Washington, Jefferson, and Madison all supported a permanent capital on the Potomac; Hamilton backed a temporary capital in New York City, and a permanent one in Trenton, New Jersey. At the same time, Hamilton's funding proposal, a plan in which the federal government would assume debts incurred by states in waging the Revolutionary War was failing to garner enough support to pass. Jefferson, understanding that Hamilton needed southern votes to pass his funding plan, and keenly aware that the Potomac capital concept would fail without additional northern support, made use of an opportunity provided by an encounter with Hamilton to stage an informal dinner meeting at which interested parties could discuss a "mutual accommodation." The deal subsequently struck, known as the Compromise of 1790, cleared the way for passage, in July 1790, of the Residence Act. The act transferred the federal capital to Philadelphia for 10 years, while a permanent capital along the Potomac was under construction. Hamilton's debt assumption plan became law with the passage of the Funding Act of 1790.

The Residence Act authorized the president to select a specific site along the Potomac for the permanent seat of government. It also authorized him to appoint three commissioners to survey and acquire property for the federal city. Washington announced his selection of a site on January 24, 1791, and planning for the new city began afterward. Washington personally oversaw this effort through the end of his presidency. In September 1791, the commissioners named the nascent city Washington, in the president's honor, and the district Columbia, which was a poetic name for the United States commonly in use at that time.

Construction on the White House (then called the President's House) was begun in 1792. Washington laid the cornerstone for the United States Capitol (then called the Congress House) on September 18, 1793. John Adams, Washington's successor, moved into the White House in November 1800; that same month, Congress held its first session in the Capitol. The following February, Congress approved the District of Columbia Organic Act of 1801, which officially organized the District of Columbia, and, in accordance with the Constitution, named Congress as its exclusive governing authority.

=== Tariff of 1789 ===
One of the most pressing issues facing the First Congress during its inaugural session was the issue of how to raise revenue for the federal government. Because direct taxes were politically unfeasible, Congress turned to the tariff as the main source of funding. The tariffs could also protect nascent American manufacturing by increasing the cost of imported goods, many of which came from Britain. Each region sought favorable terms for the duties on various goods. Because the federal government would be unable to even pay the salaries of its officials without passage of the bill, members of Congress were strongly motivated to reach a compromise. In July, Congress finally passed the Tariff of 1789, which Washington signed into law. The act created a uniform impost on goods carried by foreign ships, while also establishing a much smaller tax on goods carried by American-owned ships. The tariffs established by this and later acts would make up the vast majority of government revenue; more than 87 percent of the federal government's revenue between 1789 and 1800 came from import duties.

To enable the federal government to collect the import duties, Congress also passed the Collection Act of 1789, which established the United States Customs Service and designated ports of entry. One year later, the Revenue-Marine was established when Washington signed legislation authorizing construction of ten cutters to enforce federal tariff and trade laws and to prevent smuggling. Until Congress established the Navy Department in 1798, it served as the nation's only armed force afloat. Renamed a century later as the Revenue Cutter Service, it and the U.S. Life-Saving Service were merged in 1915 to form the United States Coast Guard.

=== Hamiltonian economic program ===
After the passage of the Tariff of 1789, various other plans were considered to address the debt issues during the first session of Congress, but none were able to generate widespread support. In September 1789, with no resolution in sight and the close of that session drawing near, Congress directed Secretary of the Treasury Alexander Hamilton to prepare a credit report. In his Report on the Public Credit, Hamilton estimated that the state and federal governments had a combined debt of $79 million; he projected that the federal government's annual income would be $2.8 million. Drawing on the ideas of Robert Morris and others, Hamilton proposed the most ambitious and far-reaching economic plan that had ever been advanced by an American, calling for the federal assumption of state debt and the mass issuance of federal bonds. Hamilton believed that these measures would restore the ailing economy, ensure a stable and adequate money stock, and make it easier for the federal government to borrow during emergencies such as wars. He also proposed redeeming the promissory notes issued by the Continental Congress during the American Revolution at full value, thereby establishing the precedent that the government would uphold the value of its securities. Hamilton's proposal drew opposition from Madison, who was reluctant to reward the speculators who had bought up many of the promissory notes at a fraction of their value after the Revolutionary War.

Congressional delegations from Virginia, Maryland, and Georgia, which had lower or no debts, and whose citizens would effectively pay a portion of the debt of other states if the federal government assumed it, were disinclined to accept the proposal. Many in Congress argued that the plan was beyond the constitutional power of the new government. James Madison led the effort to block the provision and prevent the plan from gaining approval. Others contended that the debts should be repudiated, and the United States should refuse to pay them. Washington supported Hamilton's plan but refused to become involved in the congressional debate, and opposition mounted in the House of Representatives. The debate over assumption became entangled with the simultaneous debate over the site of the nation's capital. In the Compromise of 1790, Hamilton's assumption plan was adopted as the Funding Act of 1790, as several southern congressmen voted for the bill in exchange for a capital located on the Potomac River.

Later in 1790, Hamilton issued another set of recommendations in his Second Report on Public Credit. The report called for the establishment of a national bank and an excise tax on distilled spirits. Hamilton's proposed national bank would provide credit to fledgling industries, serve as a depository for government funds, and oversee one nationwide currency. In response to Hamilton's proposal, Congress passed the Bank Bill of 1791, establishing the First Bank of the United States. Madison and Attorney General Randolph lobbied Washington to veto the bill as an unconstitutional extension of the federal government's authority. Washington, having ten days to sign or veto the bill, sent their objections to Hamilton for comment. Hamilton persuasively argued that the Constitution granted Congress the power to establish the national bank. He asserted that the Constitution guaranteed "implied as well as express powers", and that government would be paralyzed should the latter not be acknowledged and exercised. After receiving Hamilton's letter, Washington still harbored some doubts, but he nonetheless signed the bill into law that evening.

The following year, Congress passed the Coinage Act of 1792, establishing the United States Mint and the United States dollar, and regulating the coinage of the United States. Historian Samuel Morison points to Hamilton's 1790 bank report as turning Jefferson against Hamilton. Jefferson feared that the creation of the national bank would lead to political, economic, and social inequality, with Northern financial interests dominating American society much as aristocrats dominated European society.

In December 1791, Hamilton published the Report on Manufactures, which recommended numerous policies designed to protect U.S. merchants and industries to increase national wealth, induce artisans to immigrate, cause machinery to be invented, and employ women and children. Hamilton called for federally supervised infrastructure projects, the establishment of state-owned munitions factories and subsidies for privately owned factories, and the imposition of a protective tariff. Though Congress had adopted much of Hamilton's earlier proposals, his manufacturing proposals fell flat, even in the more-industrialized North, as merchant shipowners had a stake in free trade. There were also questions raised about the constitutionality of these proposals, and opponents such as Jefferson feared that Hamilton's expansive interpretation of the Necessary and Proper Clause would grant Congress the power to legislate on any subject.

In 1792, with their relationship completely ruptured, Jefferson unsuccessfully tried to convince Washington to remove Hamilton, but Washington largely supported Hamilton's ideas, believing that they had led to social and economic stability. Dissonance over Hamilton's proposals also irrevocably broke the relationship between Washington and Madison, who had served as the president's foremost congressional ally during the first year of his presidency. Opponents of Hamilton and the administration won several seats in the 1792 congressional elections, and Hamilton was unable to win congressional approval of his ambitious economic proposals afterward.

=== Whiskey Rebellion ===
Despite the additional import duties imposed by the Tariff of 1790, a substantial federal deficit remained – chiefly due to the federal assumption of state revolution-related debts under the Funding Act. By December 1790, Hamilton believed import duties, which were the government's primary source of revenue, had been raised as high as was feasible. He therefore promoted passage of an excise tax on domestically distilled spirits. This was to be the first tax levied by the national government on a domestic product. Both Hamilton and Madison believed that an excise tax on spirits was the least objectionable tax that the government could levy at that time; a direct tax on land would be even more unpopular. The tax had the support of some social reformers, who hoped that the tax would discourage alcohol consumption. The Distilled Spirits Duties Act, commonly known as the "Whiskey Act", became law on March 3, 1791, and went into effect on June 1.

The tax on whiskey was bitterly and fiercely opposed on the frontier from the day it was passed. Western farmers considered it to be both unfair and discriminatory. As the Lower Mississippi River had been closed to American shipping for nearly a decade, farmers in western Pennsylvania were forced to turn their grain into whiskey. The substantial reduction in volume resulting from the distillation of grain into whiskey greatly reduced the cost of transporting their crops to the populous East Coast, which was the only place where there were markets for their crops. In mid-1794, the government began to crack down on tax evasion, launching prosecutions against dozens of distilleries.

On July 15, 1794, tax collector John Neville and his slaves fired at a militia that had surrounded his house, killing a member of the militia. The next day, a group of militia members seeking Neville fired on a group of federal soldiers, causing casualties on both sides. Following this confrontation, the militia captured a federal marshal and continued to clash with federal forces. As word of this rebellion spread across the frontier, a whole series of loosely organized resistance measures were taken, including robbing the mail, stopping court proceedings, and the threat of an assault on Pittsburgh.

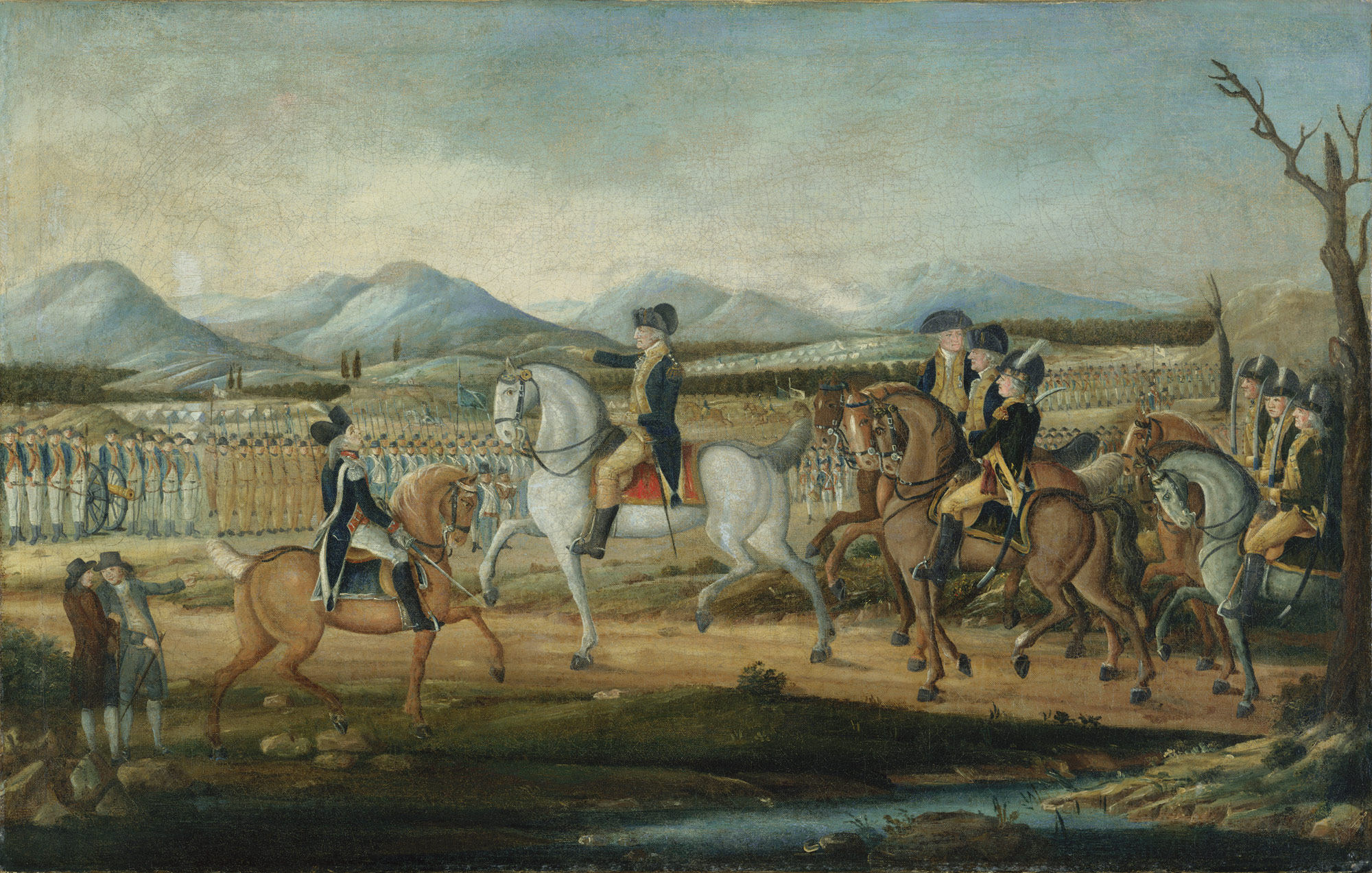
In leading the militia against the Whiskey Rebellion, Washington became one of only two sitting U.S. presidents to exercise battlefield authority.

Washington, alarmed by what appeared to be an armed insurrection in Western Pennsylvania, asked his cabinet for written opinions about how to deal with the crisis. Hamilton, Knox, and Attorney General Bradford all favored using a militia to crush the rebellion, while Secretary of State Randolph urged peaceful reconciliation. Washington heeded the advice of both factions of his cabinet – he sent commissioners to meet with the rebels, while at the same time preparing soldiers to march into Western Pennsylvania. When the final report of the commissioners recommended the use of the militia to enforce the laws, the president invoked the Militia Law of 1792 to summon the militias of Pennsylvania, Virginia and several other states. The governors sent the troops and Washington took command as Commander-in-Chief.

Washington commanded a militia force of 12,950 men, roughly the same size as the Continental Army he had commanded during the Revolutionary War. Under the personal command of Washington, Hamilton, and Revolutionary War hero General Henry "Light-Horse Harry" Lee, the army assembled in Harrisburg and marched into Western Pennsylvania (to what is now Monongahela, Pennsylvania) in October 1794. The insurrection collapsed quickly with little violence, and the resistance movements disbanded. The men arrested for rebellion were imprisoned, where one died, while two were convicted of treason and sentenced to death by hanging. Later, Washington pardoned all the men involved.

The suppression of the Whiskey Rebellion was met with widespread popular approval. This was the first time the new government had been directly opposed, and through a clear show of federal authority, Washington established the principle that federal law is the supreme law of the land, and demonstrated that the federal government had both the ability and willingness to suppress violent resistance to the nation's laws. The government's response to the rebellion was, therefore, viewed by the Washington administration as a success, a view that has generally been endorsed by historians.

=== Rise of political parties ===
Federalists used a black and white cockade as a symbol.

Initially, Jefferson and Hamilton enjoyed a friendly working relationship. While never close, they seldom clashed during the first year of the Washington administration. Even so, deep philosophical differences soon caused a rift between them, and finally drove them apart. Hamilton believed that a vigorous use of the central government was essential for the task of nation-building. He also believed that "a flourishing merchant economy would sow opportunities for all, resulting in a more philanthropic, knowledgeable and enterprising people." In Jefferson's view, centralized government was "simply European-style tyranny waiting to happen again." He idealized the yeoman farmers, for they "controlled their own destinies, and also a republic that, resting on the yeoman farmer, would keep 'alive that sacred fire' of personal liberty and virtue." These differences gained their clearest expression in the debate about the Bank of the United States.

As a split grew proponents and critics of Hamilton's economic policies, Jefferson and Madison sought to counter the influence of a Hamilton-aligned newspaper, the Gazette of the United States. They convinced Philip Freneau to establish the National Gazette, which recast the national politics not as a battle between Federalists and Anti-Federalists, but as a debate between aristocrats and republicans. By the end of 1792, political observers had begun to note the emergence of two political parties. In May 1792, Hamilton himself wrote, "Mr. Madison cooperating with Mr. Jefferson is at the head of a faction decidedly hostile to me and my administration." Washington sought to alleviate the rising tension between Jefferson and Hamilton, as well as prevent the partisan polarization of national politics, but by the end of 1792 Jefferson and his followers completely distrusted Hamilton. The faction aligned with Hamilton became known as the Federalists, while those aligned with Jefferson and Madison became known as the Republicans (often referred to as the Democratic-Republican Party to avoid confusion with the modern Republican Party). Political leaders of both groups, but especially the Federalists, were reluctant to label their faction as a political party. Nonetheless, distinct and consistent voting blocs emerged in Congress in 1793. The Democratic-Republicans were strongest in the South, and many of the party's leaders were wealthy Southern slaveowners. The Democratic-Republicans also attracted middle-class Northerners, such as artisans, farmers, and lower-level merchants, who were eager to challenge the power of the local elite. The Federalists had broad support in New England, but in other places, they relied on wealthy merchants and landowners.

Democratic-Republicans used a red, white and blue cockade as a symbol.

While economic policies were the original motivating factor in the growing partisan split, foreign policy also became a factor. Though most Americans supported the French Revolution before the execution of Louis XVI, some of Hamilton's followers began to fear the radical egalitarianism of the revolution as it became increasingly violent. Washington was particularly concerned by Britain's possible entry into the war, as he worried that American sympathy for France and hostility towards Britain would propel the United States into the conflict as well, to the ruin of the American economy. In 1793, after Britain entered the French Revolutionary Wars, several Democratic-Republican Societies were formed. These societies, centered on the middle class of several eastern cities, opposed Hamilton's economic policies and supported France. Conservatives came to fear these societies as populist movements that sought to re-make the class order. In the same year, the British began seizing American merchantmen trading with France, leading to an increase in anti-British sentiment among the American public. As Washington continued to seek peaceful relations with Britain, critics finally began to attack the president himself.

After crushing the Whiskey Rebellion, Washington publicly blamed the Democratic-Republican Societies for the rebellion, and Jefferson began to view Washington as "the head of a party" rather than "the head of a nation." Hamilton's followers, who coalesced into the Federalist Party, were thrilled by Washington's remarks, and the party sought to closely associate itself with Washington. The passage of the Jay Treaty further inflamed partisan warfare, resulting in a hardening of the divisions between the Federalists and the Democratic-Republicans. By 1795–96, election campaigns—federal, state, and local—were waged primarily along partisan lines between the two national parties, although local issues continued to affect elections, and party affiliations remained in flux.

=== Constitutional amendments ===
Congress approved 12 amendments to the U.S. Constitution on September 25, 1789, establishing specific constitutional guarantees of personal freedoms and rights, clear limitations on the government's power in judicial and other proceedings, and explicit declarations that all powers not specifically delegated to Congress by the Constitution are reserved for the states or the people, and submitted them to the state legislatures for ratification. Congressional approval of the amendments was led by James Madison. Madison had previously opposed amending the Constitution, but he hoped to prevent more far-reaching reforms by passing his package of constitutional amendments. With the support of Washington, Madison put together a package of relatively uncontroversial amendments that won the backing of both Federalist and Anti-Federalist members of Congress. Congress passed a package of constitutional amendments that were largely based on Madison's original proposals, though some of Madison's ideas were not adopted.

Although some Anti-Federalists continued to call for a new federal constitutional convention and ridiculed them, by December 15, 1791, 10 of the 12 proposed amendments had been ratified by the requisite number of states (then 11), and became Amendments One through Ten of the Constitution; collectively they are known as the Bill of Rights. (Note: One of the two amendments not ratified in 1791 was later ratified, May 7, 1992, becoming the Twenty-seventh Amendment; The other amendment is technically still pending before the states.)

On March 4, 1794, in response to the ruling in Chisholm v. Georgia, Congress approved an amendment to the United States Constitution clarifying judicial power over foreign nationals, and limiting the ability of citizens to sue states in federal courts and under federal law, and submitted it to the state legislatures for ratification. The Eleventh Amendment to the United States Constitution was ratified by the requisite number of states (then 12) on February 7, 1795, to become part of the Constitution.

=== Slavery ===
In 1790, the Pennsylvania Abolition Society engaged in an unprecedented lobbying campaign to abolish slavery. Their efforts faced intense opposition from most southern congressmen, who blocked any attempt to abolish an institution that was important to their plantation economy. After a contentious debate, congressional leaders put the proposals aside without voting on them, setting a precedent in which Congress generally avoided discussing slavery. Congress passed two acts related to slavery during the Washington administration: the Fugitive Slave Act of 1793, which made it a federal crime to assist an escaping slave, and established the legal system by which escaped slaves would be returned to their masters; and the Slave Trade Act of 1794, which limited the United States' involvement in the transportation of slaves by prohibiting the export of slaves from the country.

=== Northwest Indian War ===
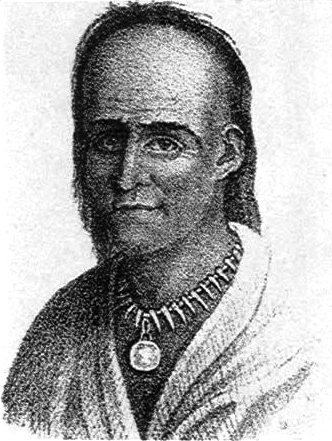
Chief Little Turtle (mihšihkinaahkwa)

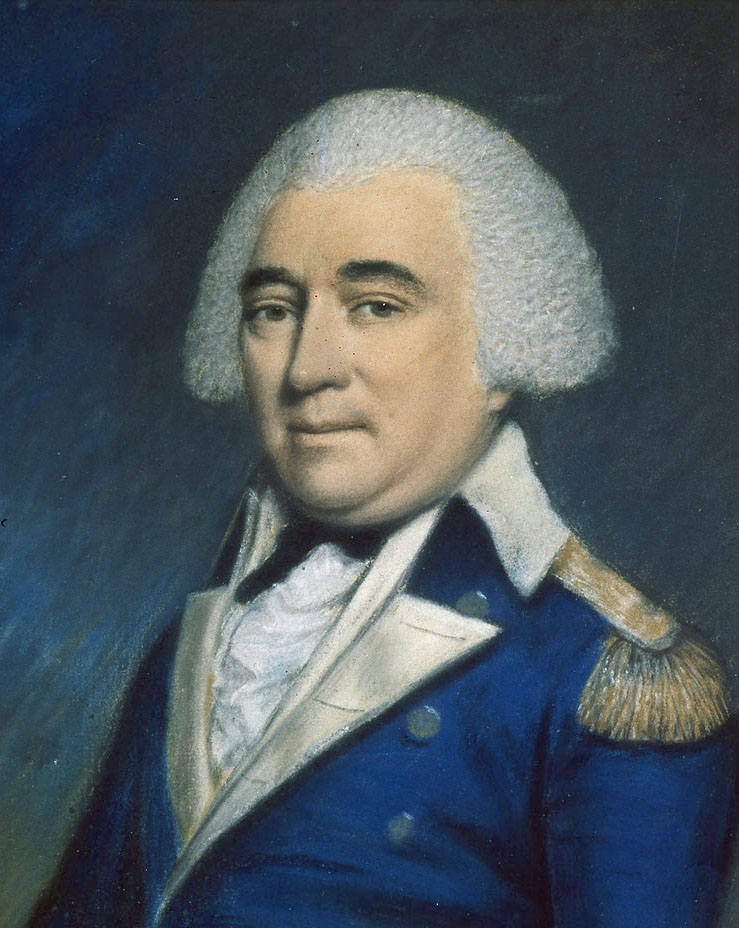
Major General Anthony Wayne

Following the adoption of the Land Ordinance of 1785, American settlers began freely moving west across the Allegheny Mountains and into the Native American-occupied lands beyond – land Great Britain had ceded to U.S. control at the end of the Revolutionary War (the Northwest Territory). As they did, they encountered unyielding and often violent resistance from a confederation of tribes. In 1789 (before Washington entered office), an agreement that was supposed to address the grievances of the tribes, the Treaty of Fort Harmar, was signed. This new treaty did almost nothing to stop the rash of violence along the frontier from confrontations between settlers and Native Americans and, the following year, Washington directed the United States Army to enforce U.S. sovereignty. Secretary of War Henry Knox ordered Brigadier General Josiah Harmar to launch a major offensive against the Shawnee and Miami Natives living in the region. In October 1790, his force of 1,453 men was assembled near present-day Fort Wayne, Indiana. Harmar committed only 400 of his men under Colonel John Hardin to attack a Native American force of some 1,100 warriors, who easily defeated Hardin's forces. At least 129 soldiers were killed.

Determined to avenge the defeat, the president ordered Major General Arthur St. Clair, who was serving as the governor of the Northwest Territory, to mount a more vigorous effort by the third quarter of 1791. After considerable trouble finding men and supplies, St. Clair was finally ready. At dawn on November 4, 1791, his poorly trained force, accompanied by about 200 camp followers, was camped near the present-day location of Fort Recovery, Ohio. A Native American force consisting of around 2,000 warriors led by Little Turtle, Blue Jacket, and Tecumseh, struck with swift and overwhelming displays of force, and, paralyzing the Americans with fear, soon overran their perimeter. St. Clair's army was almost annihilated during the three-hour encounter. The American casualty rate included 632 of 920 soldiers and officers killed (69%) and 264 wounded. Nearly all of the 200 camp followers were slaughtered, for a total of about 832.

British officials in Upper Canada were delighted and encouraged by the success of the Natives, whom they had been supporting and arming for years, and in 1792 Lieutenant Governor John Graves Simcoe proposed that the entire territory, plus a strip of New York and Vermont be erected into an Indian barrier state. While the British government did not take this proposal up, it did inform the Washington administration that it would not relinquish the Northwest forts, even if the U.S. paid its overdue debts. Also, early in 1794, the British built a new garrison, Fort Miami, along the Maumee River as a show of presence and support for the resistance.

Outraged by news of the defeat, Washington urged Congress to raise an army capable of conducting a successful offense against the Native confederacy, which it did in March 1792 – establishing more Army regiments (the Legion of the United States), adding three-year enlistments, and increasing military pay. The following month the House of Representatives conducted investigative hearings into the debacle. This was the first special congressional investigation under the federal Constitution. Afterward, Congress passed two Militia Acts: the first empowered the president to call out the militias of the several states; the second required that every free able-bodied white male citizen of the various states, between the ages of 18 and 45, enroll in the militia of the state in which they reside.

Next, Washington put Major General "Mad" Anthony Wayne in command of the Legion of the United States and ordered him to launch a new expedition against the Western Confederacy. Wayne spent months training his troops at the army's first formal basic training facility in Legionville, Pennsylvania, in military skills, forest warfare tactics, and discipline, then led them west. In late 1793, the Legion began construction of Fort Recovery at the location of St. Clair's defeat; and, on June 30 – July 1, 1794, successfully defended it from a Native American attack led by Little Turtle.

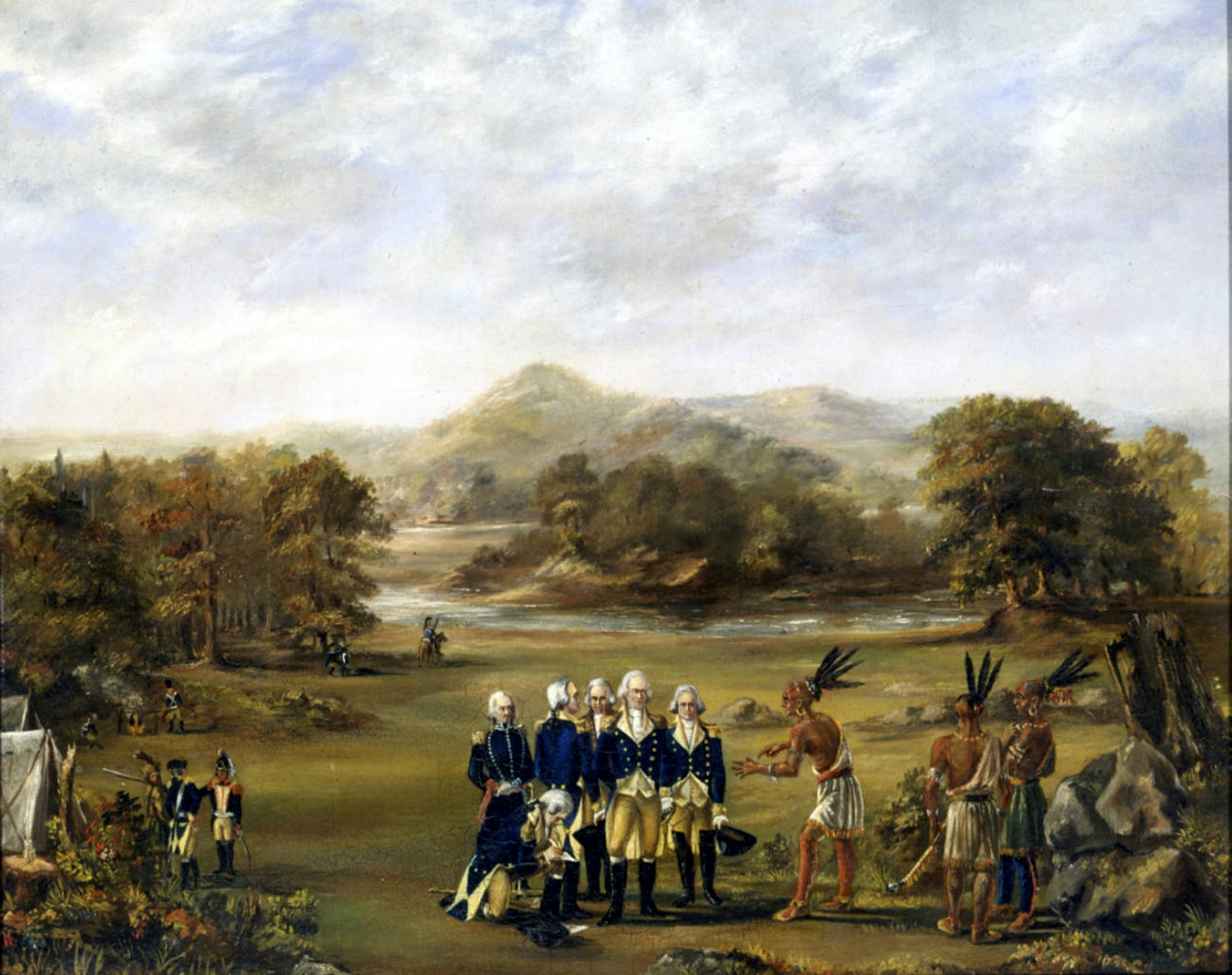
Oil on canvas depiction of the Treaty of Greenville talks that ended the Northwest Indian War

Taking the offensive, the legion marched north through the forest, and, upon reaching the confluence of the Auglaize and Maumee Rivers —about 45 miles (72 km) southwest of Fort Miami— on August 8, built Fort Defiance, a stockade with blockhouse bastions. There he offered peace, which was rejected. Wayne's soldiers advanced toward Fort Miami and on August 20, 1794, encountered Native American confederacy forces led by Blue Jacket, in what has become known as the Battle of Fallen Timbers. The first assault on Wayne's Legion was successful, but were able to regroup quickly and pressed the attack with a bayonet charge. The cavalry outflanked Blue Jacket's warriors, who were easily routed. They fled towards Fort Miami but were surprised to find the gates closed against them. The fort's commander, Major William Campbell, refused to open the gates as he was unwilling to start a war with the United States. Wayne's army had won a decisive victory, and his troops spent several days destroying the nearby Native villages and crops before withdrawing.

Thanks to the effectiveness of Wayne's scorched earth campaign, Native American resistance quickly collapsed. Delegates from the various confederation tribes, 1130 persons total, gathered for a peace conference at Fort Greene Ville in June 1795. The conference lasted for six weeks, resulting, on August 3, 1795, in the Treaty of Greenville between the assembled tribes and the "15 fires of the United States." Under its terms, the tribes ceded most of what is now Ohio for American settlement, recognized the United States (rather than Great Britain) as the ruling power in the region, and turned ten chiefs over to the U.S. government as hostages until all white prisoners were returned. This, along with the recently signed Jay Treaty, which provided for the British withdrawal from pre-Revolutionary War forts in the region it had not yet relinquished, solidified U.S. sovereignty over the Northwest Territory. Believing that the Natives were on the verge of extinction due to uncontrolled white settlement in protected lands, Washington and Knox sought to assimilate them into American society. In the Southwest, Washington pursued this policy of assimilation through treaties such as the Treaty of New York and the Treaty of Holston.

== Foreign affairs ==
=== French Revolution ===
==== Public debate ====
The storming of the Bastille on July 14, 1789, marked the beginning of the French Revolution. President Washington kept the United States neutral during the conflict.

With the Storming of the Bastille on July 14, 1789, the French Revolution erupted. The American public, remembering the aid provided by the French during the Revolutionary War, was largely enthusiastic, and hoped for democratic reforms that would solidify the existing Franco-American alliance and transform France into a republican ally against aristocratic and monarchical Britain. Shortly after the Bastille fell, the main prison key was turned over to the Marquis de Lafayette, a Frenchman who had served under Washington in the American Revolutionary War. In an expression of optimism about the revolution's chances for success, Lafayette sent the key to Washington, who displayed it prominently in the executive mansion. John Skey Eustace kept him informed of the events of the French Revolution.

In the Caribbean, the revolution destabilized the French colony of Saint-Domingue (present-day Haiti), as it split the government into royalist and revolutionary factions, and aroused the people to demand civil rights for themselves. Sensing an opportunity, the slaves of northern St. Domingue organized and planned a massive rebellion which began on August 22, 1791. Their successful revolution resulted in the establishment of the second independent country in the Americas (after the United States). Soon after the revolt began, the Washington administration, at French request, agreed to send money, arms, and provisions to Saint-Domingue to assist distressed slave-owning colonists. Reacting to reports spread by fleeing Frenchmen of Haitian slaves murdering people, many Southerners believed that a successful slave revolt in Haiti would lead to a massive race war in America. American aid to Saint-Domingue formed part of the US repayment of Revolutionary War loans and eventually amounted to about $400,000 and 1,000 military weapons.

From 1790 to 1794, the French Revolution became increasingly radical. In 1792 the revolutionary government declared war on several European nations, including Britain, starting the War of the First Coalition. A wave of bloody massacres spread through Paris and other cities late that summer, leaving more than one thousand people dead. On September 21, 1792, France declared itself a republic, and the deposed King Louis XVI was guillotined on January 21, 1793. Then followed a period labeled by some historians as the "Reign of Terror", between the summer of 1793 and the end of July 1794, during which 16,594 official death sentences were carried out against those accused of being enemies of the revolution. Among the executed were persons who had aided the American rebels during the Revolutionary War, such as the naval officer Charles Henri Hector, Count of Estaing. Lafayette, who was appointed commander-in-chief of the National Guard following the storming of the Bastille, fled France and ended up in captivity in Austria, while Thomas Paine, in France to support the revolutionaries, was imprisoned in Paris.

Though originally most Americans were in support of the revolution, the political debate in the U.S. over the nature of the revolution soon exacerbated pre-existing political divisions and resulted in the alignment of the political elite along pro-French and pro-British lines. Thomas Jefferson became the leader of the pro-French faction that celebrated the revolution's republican ideals. Though originally in support of the revolution, Alexander Hamilton soon led the faction that viewed the revolution with skepticism (believing that "absolute liberty would lead to absolute tyranny") and sought to preserve existing commercial ties with Britain. When news reached America that France had declared war on Britain, people were divided on whether the U.S. should enter the war on the side of France. Jefferson and his faction wanted to aid the French, while Hamilton and his followers supported neutrality in the conflict. Jeffersonians denounced Hamilton, Vice President Adams, and even the president as friends of Britain, monarchists, and enemies of the republican values that all true Americans cherish. Hamiltonians warned that Jefferson's Republicans would replicate the terrors of the French Revolution in America – "crowd rule" akin to anarchy, and the destruction of "all order and rank in society and government."

==== American neutrality ====
Although the president, who believed that the United States was too weak and unstable to fight another war with a major European power, wished to avoid any foreign entanglements, a sizable portion of the American public was ready to help the French and their fight for "liberty, equality, and fraternity." In the days immediately following Washington's second inauguration, the revolutionary government of France sent diplomat Edmond-Charles Genêt, called "Citizen Genêt", to America. Genêt's mission was to drum up support for the French cause. Genêt issued letters of marque and reprisal to American ships so they could capture British merchant ships. He attempted to turn popular sentiment towards American involvement in the French war against Britain by creating a network of Democratic-Republican Societies in major cities.

Washington was deeply irritated by this subversive meddling, and when Genêt allowed a French-sponsored warship to sail out of Philadelphia against direct presidential orders, Washington demanded that France recall Genêt. By this time the revolution had taken a more violent approach and Genêt would have been executed had he returned to France. He appealed to Washington, and Washington allowed him to remain, making him the first political refugee to seek sanctuary in the United States. Genêt's actual effectiveness has been contested, with Forrest McDonald writing that "Genêt was almost obsolete by the time he arrived in Charleston on April 8, 1793."

During the Genêt episode, Washington, after consulting his Cabinet, issued a Proclamation of Neutrality on April 22, 1793. In it, he declared the United States neutral in the conflict between Great Britain and France. He also threatened legal proceedings against any American assisting with any of the warring countries. Washington eventually recognized that supporting either Great Britain or France was a false dichotomy. He would do neither, thereby shielding the fledgling U.S. from, in his view, unnecessary harm. The Proclamation was formalized into law by the Neutrality Act of 1794.

The public had mixed opinions about Washington's Proclamation of Neutrality. Those who supported Madison and Jefferson were far more likely to be in support of the French Revolution, as they saw it as an opportunity for a nation to achieve liberty from tyrannical rule. Several merchants were extremely happy that the President decided to remain impartial to the revolution. They believed that if the government took a stance on the war, it would ruin their trade relations with the British completely. This economic element was a primary reason for many Federalist supporters wanting to avoid increased conflict with the British. Hamilton supported the Proclamation of Neutrality, defending it both in cabinet meetings, and in newspapers under the pseudonym "Pacificus." He encouraged Washington to issue the Proclamation, lecturing him about the need for a "continuance of the peace, the desire of which may be said to be both universal and ardent."

=== Relations with Great Britain ===
==== Seizures and economic retaliation ====
Upon going to war against France, the British began intercepting ships of neutral countries bound for French ports. The French imported large amounts of American foodstuffs, and the British hoped to starve France into defeat by intercepting these shipments. In November 1793, the British government widened the scope of these seizures to include any neutral ships trading with the French West Indies, including those flying the American flag. By the following March, more than 250 U.S. merchant ships had been seized. The American public was outraged, and angry protests erupted in several cities. Many Jeffersonians in Congress demanded a declaration of war, but Congressman James Madison instead called for strong economic retaliation, including an embargo on all trade with Britain. Further inflaming anti-British sentiment in Congress, news arrived while the matter was under debate that the Governor General of British North America, Lord Dorchester, had made a speech inciting Native tribes in the Northwest Territory against the US. (Note: It was reported that in February 1794, the Governor General of British North America, Lord Dorchester, told leaders of the Seven Nations of Canada that war between the U.S. and Britain was likely to break out before the year was out. He also stated that, due to American aggression in the region, the U.S. had forfeited the region (south of the Great Lakes) awarded by the 1783 Treaty of Paris. Dorchester was officially reprimanded by the Crown for his strong and unsanctioned words.)

Congress responded to these "outrages" by passing a 30-day embargo on all shipping, foreign and domestic, in American harbors. In the meantime, the British government had issued an order in council partially repealing effects of the November order. This policy change did not defeat the whole movement for commercial retaliation, but it cooled passions somewhat. The embargo was later renewed for a second month but then was permitted to expire. In response to Britain's more conciliatory policies, Washington named Supreme Court Chief Justice John Jay as special envoy to Great Britain to avoid war. (Note: While the Ineligibility Clause of Article I, Section 6 of the Constitution prohibits persons serving in a federal executive or judicial branch office from simultaneously serving in Congress, it does not (nor does any other constitutional provision) prohibit simultaneous service in executive branch and judicial branch offices. As well as John Jay, Chief Justices Oliver Ellsworth and John Marshall also served dual executive and judicial offices in the early decades of the nation's existence. More recently, Associate Justice Robert H. Jackson was appointed to serve as U.S. Chief of Counsel for the prosecution of Nazi war criminals at the 1945–46 Nuremberg trials, and Chief Justice Earl Warren was appointed as chairman of the 1964 commission formed to investigate the assassination of John F. Kennedy.) This appointment provoked the ire of Jeffersonians. Although confirmed by a comfortable margin in the U.S. Senate (18–8), debate on the nomination was bitter.

==== Jay Treaty ====
Jay was instructed by Alexander Hamilton to seek compensation for the seizure of American ships and to clarify the rules governing the British seizure of neutral ships. He was also to insist that the British relinquish their posts in the Northwest. In return, the U.S. would take responsibility for pre-Revolution debts owed to British merchants and subjects. He also asked Jay, if possible, to seek limited access for American ships to the British West Indies. Jay and the British Foreign Secretary, Lord Grenville, began negotiations on July 30, 1794. The treaty that emerged several weeks later, commonly known as the Jay Treaty, was, in Jay's words "equal and fair." Both sides achieved many objectives; several issues were sent to arbitration. For the British, America remained neutral and economically grew closer to Britain. The Americans also guaranteed favorable treatment to British imports. In return, the British agreed to evacuate the western forts and open their West Indian ports to smaller American ships, allow small vessels to trade with the French West Indies, and set up a commission that would adjudicate American claims against Britain for seized ships, and British claims against Americans for debts incurred before 1775. As the treaty contained neither concessions on impressment nor a statement of rights for American sailors, another commission was later established to settle both those and boundary issues.

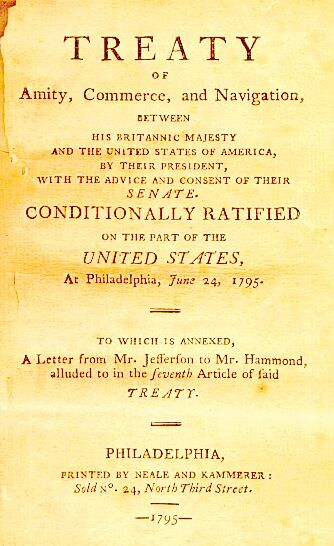
Cover of a 1795 pamphlet containing the text of the Jay Treaty

Once the treaty arrived in Philadelphia in March 1795, Washington—who had misgivings about the treaty's terms—kept its contents confidential until June, when a special session of the Senate convened to give its advice and consent. Peter Trubowitz writes that during these several months, Washington wrestled with "a strategic dilemma", balancing geopolitics and domestic politics. "If he threw his support behind the treaty, he risked destroying his fragile government from within due to partisan rage. If he shelved the treaty to silence his political detractors, there would likely be war with Great Britain, which had the potential to destroy the government from the outside." Submitted on June 8, debate on the treaty's 27 articles was carried out in secret, and lasted for more than two weeks. Republican senators, who wanted to pressure Britain to the brink of war, denounced the Jay Treaty as an insult to American prestige, and a repudiation of the 1778 treaty with France; New York's Aaron Burr argued point-by-point why the whole agreement should be renegotiated. On June 24, the Senate approved the treaty by a vote of 20–10 – the precise two-thirds majority vote necessary for ratification.

Although the Senate hoped to keep the treaty secret until Washington had decided whether or not to sign it, it was leaked to a Philadelphia editor who printed it in full on June 30. Once the public became aware of the terms of the agreement, in the words of Samuel Morison, "a howl of rage went up that Jay had betrayed his country." The reaction to the treaty was the most negative in the South. Southern planters, who owed the pre-Revolution debts to the British and who were now not going to collect for the slaves who had escaped to them during the Revolutionary War, viewed it as a great indignity. As a result, the Federalists lost most of the support they had among planters. Protests, organized by Republicans, included petitions, incendiary pamphlets, and a series of public meetings held in the larger cities, each of which addressed a memorial to the president. As protests from treaty opponents intensified, Washington's initial neutral position shifted to a solid pro-treaty stance, aided by Hamilton's elaborate analysis of the treaty and his two-dozen newspaper essays promoting it. The British, to promote the signing of the treaty, delivered a letter in which Randolph was revealed to have taken bribes from the French. Randolph was forced to resign from the cabinet; his opposition to the treaty became worthless. On August 24, Washington signed the treaty.

Following Washington signing the treaty, there was a temporary lull in the furor. By late 1796, the Federalists had gained twice as many signatures in favor of the treaty as had been gathered against it. Public opinion had been swayed in favor of the treaty. The following year, it flared up again when the House of Representatives inserted itself into the debate. The new debate was not only over the merits of the treaty, but also about whether the House had the power under the Constitution to refuse to appropriate the money necessary for a treaty already ratified by the Senate and signed by the president. Citing its constitutional fiscal authority (Article I, Section 7), the House requested that the president turn over all documents that related to the treaty, including his instructions to Jay, all correspondence, and all other documents relating to the treaty negotiations. He refused to do so, invoking what later became known as executive privilege, and insisted that the House did not have the Constitutional authority to block treaties. A contentious debate ensued, during which Washington's most vehement opponents in the House publicly called for his impeachment. Through it all, Washington responded to his critics by using his prestige, political skills, and the power of office in a sincere and straightforward fashion to broaden public support for his stance. The Federalists heavily promoted the passage, waging what Forrest McDonald calls "The most intensive campaign of pressure politics the nation had yet known." On April 30, the House voted 51–48 to approve the requisite treaty funding. Jeffersonians carried their campaign against the treaty and "pro-British Federalist policies" into the political campaigns (both state and federal) of 1796, where the political divisions marking the First Party System became crystallized.

The treaty pushed the new nation away from France and towards Great Britain. The French government concluded that it violated the Franco-American treaty of 1778 and that the U.S. government had accepted the treaty despite the overwhelming public sentiment against it. This set up a series of diplomatic and political conflicts over the ensuing four years, culminating in the Quasi-War. The Jay Treaty also helped ensure American control of its frontier lands. After the signing of the treaty, the British withdrew their support from several Native American tribes, while the Spanish, fearing that the Jay Treaty signaled the creation of an Anglo-American alliance, sought to appease the United States.

=== Barbary pirates ===
Following the end of the Revolutionary War, the remaining ships of the Continental Navy were gradually decommissioned and their crews disbanded. The frigate Alliance, which had fired the last shots of the war in 1783, was also the last ship in the Navy. Many in the Continental Congress wanted to keep the ship in active service, but the lack of funds for repairs and upkeep, coupled with a shift in national priorities, eventually prevailed over sentiment. The ship was sold in August 1785, and the navy disbanded. At around the same time American merchant ships in the Western Mediterranean and Southeastern North Atlantic began having problems with Barbary corsairs, who operated from ports along North Africa's Barbary Coast – Algiers, Tripoli, and Tunis. In 1784–85, Algerian corsairs seized two American ships (Maria and Dauphin) and held their crews for ransom. Thomas Jefferson, then Minister to France, suggested an American naval force to protect American shipping in the Mediterranean, but his recommendations were initially met with indifference, as were later recommendations of John Jay, who proposed building five 40-gun warships. Beginning late in 1786, the Portuguese Navy began blockading Algerian ships from entering the Atlantic Ocean through the Strait of Gibraltar, which provided temporary protection for American merchant ships.

Attacks by Barbary corsairs against American merchant shipping had not been a problem before 1776, when ships from the Thirteen Colonies were protected by British warships and treaties (nor was it a problem during the Revolutionary War, as the French Navy assumed the responsibility as part of the alliance treaty). Only after the U.S. achieved its independence did Barbary corsairs begin capturing American ships and demanding ransom or tribute, which the US, lacking a navy, could do little about. The lack of a navy also inhibited the Washington administration from using military action to prevent seizures of US merchantmen by British and French authorities. Despite these events, there was great resistance in Congress to the founding of a navy. Opponents asserted that payment of tribute to the Barbary states was a better solution than building a navy, which they argued would only lead to calls for a naval department, and the staff to operate it. This would then lead to more appropriations of funds, which would eventually spiral out of control, giving birth to a "self-feeding entity." Then, in 1793, a truce negotiated between Portugal and Algiers ended Portugal's blockade of the Strait of Gibraltar, freeing the Barbary pirates to roam the Atlantic. Within months, they had captured 11 American vessels and more than 100 seamen.

The cumulation of all these events led Washington to request Congress to establish a standing navy. After a contentious debate, Congress passed the Naval Armament Act on March 27, 1794, authorizing construction of six frigates (to be built by Joshua Humphreys). These ships were the first ships of what eventually became the present-day United States Navy. Soon afterward, Congress also authorized funds to obtain a treaty with Algiers and to ransom Americans held captive (199 were alive at that time, including a few survivors from the Maria and the Dauphin). Ratified in September 1795, the final cost of the return of those held captive and peace with Algiers was $642,000, plus $21,000 in annual tribute. The president was unhappy with the arrangement but realized the U.S. had little choice but to agree to it. Treaties were also concluded with Tripoli, in 1796, and Tunis in 1797, each carrying with it an annual U.S. tribute payment obligation for protection from attack. The new Navy would not be deployed until after Washington left office; the first two frigates completed were: United States, launched May 10, 1797; and Constitution, launched October 21, 1797.

=== Relations with Spain ===
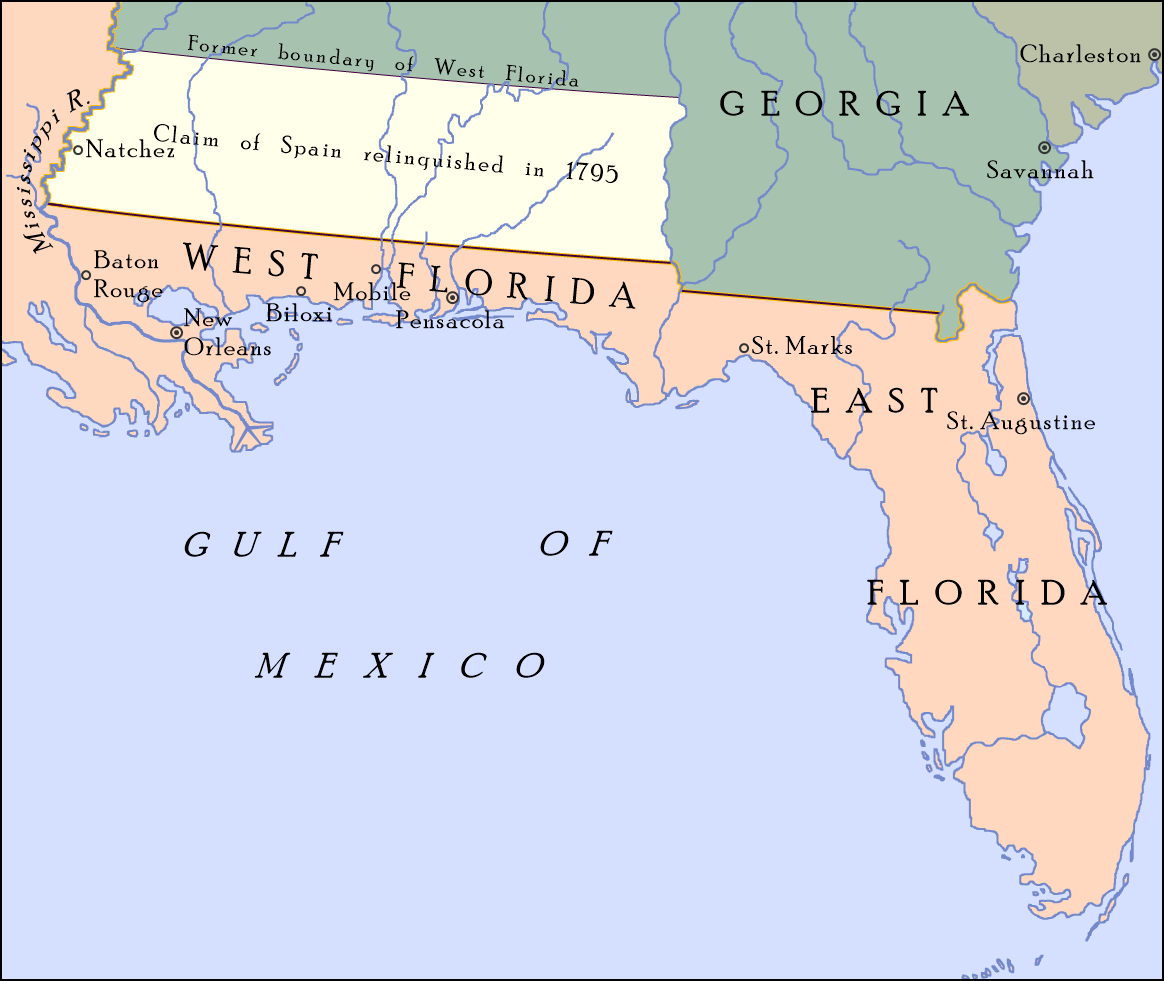
Pinckney's Treaty (effective August 3, 1796) defined the border between the United States and Spanish Florida. With this agreement, Spain relinquished its claim upon a large swath of land north of that borderline between the Appalachian Mountains and the Mississippi River.

In the late 1780s, Georgia grew eager to firm up its trans-Appalachian land claim, and meet citizen demands that the land be developed. The territory claimed by Georgia, which it called the "Yazoo lands", ran west from the Appalachian Mountains to the Mississippi River, and included most of the present-day states of Alabama and Mississippi (between 31° N and 35° N). The southern portion of this region was also claimed by Spain as part of Spanish Florida. One of Georgia's efforts to accomplish its goals for the region was a 1794 plan developed by Governor George Mathews and the Georgia General Assembly. It soon became a major political scandal, known as the Yazoo land scandal.

Spain had, since 1763, controlled the lands west of the Mississippi River. Those lands consisted of Spanish Louisiana and New Orleans. Great Britain, from 1763 to 1783, controlled the lands east of the Mississippi, British Florida, north from the Gulf of Mexico. Spain gained possession of British Florida south of 31° N and claimed the rest of it – north to 32° 22′ (the junction of the Mississippi and Yazoo Rivers). Thereafter, Spain attempted to slow the migration of American settlers into the region, and to lure those already there to secede from the United States. Toward this end, in 1784 the Spanish closed New Orleans to American goods coming down the Mississippi, which was the only viable outlet for the goods produced by many American settlers, and began selling weapons to the Native tribes in the Yazoo.

After Washington issued his 1793 Proclamation of Neutrality he became concerned that Spain, which later that year joined Britain in war against France, might work in concert with Britain to incite insurrection in the Yazoo against the U.S., using the opening of trade on the Mississippi as an enticement. At that same time though, in mid-1794, Spain was attempting to extract itself from its alliance with the British and to restore peace with France. As Spain's prime minister, Manuel de Godoy, was attempting to do so, he learned of John Jay's mission to London and became concerned that those negotiations would result in an Anglo-American alliance and an invasion of Spanish possessions in North America. Sensing the need for rapprochement, Godoy sent a request to the U.S. government for a representative empowered to negotiate a new treaty; Washington sent Thomas Pinckney to Spain in June 1795.

Eleven months after the signing of the Jay Treaty, the United States and Spain agreed to the Treaty of San Lorenzo, also known as Pinckney's Treaty. Signed on October 27, 1795, the treaty established intentions of peace and friendship between the U.S. and Spain; established the southern boundary of the U.S. with the Spanish colonies of East Florida and West Florida, with Spain relinquishing its claim on the portion of West Florida north of the 31st parallel; and established the western U.S. border as being along the Mississippi River from the northern U.S. to the 31st parallel.

Perhaps most importantly, Pinckney's Treaty granted both Spanish and American ships unrestricted navigation rights along the entire Mississippi River, as well as duty-free transport for American ships through the Spanish port of New Orleans, opening much of the Ohio River basin for settlement and trade. Agricultural produce could now flow on flatboats down the Ohio River to the Mississippi and onto New Orleans. From there the goods could be shipped around the world. Spain and the United States further agreed to protect the vessels of the other party anywhere within their jurisdictions and to not detain or embargo the other's citizens or vessels.

The final treaty also voided Spanish guarantees of military support that colonial officials had made to Native Americans in the disputed regions, greatly weakening those communities' ability to resist encroachment upon their lands. The treaty represented a major victory for the Washington administration and placated many of the critics of the Jay Treaty. It also enabled and encouraged American settlers to continue their movement west, by making the frontier areas more attractive and lucrative. The region that Spain relinquished its claim to through the treaty was organized by Congress as the Mississippi Territory on April 7, 1798.

== Presidential residences and tours ==
=== Residences ===
Washington's wife Martha managed the presidential household in the federal capital, in addition to supervising affairs at Mount Vernon. Often referred to as "lady Washington" (the term "First Lady" did not come into common use until the mid-19th century), she also organized weekly public salons, where she met with visiting dignitaries, members of Congress, and citizens from the local community. These receptions made Martha, as Abigail Adams wrote, "the object of Veneration and Respect." Martha coordinated weekly levees for the president as well. Designed to give the public access to the president and to project a dignified public image of the presidency, these receptions also elicited criticism. Opposition newspapers derided them as monarchical and wasteful. Nonetheless, the gatherings became a fixture in the capital's social scene and continued throughout Washington's presidency.

Washington and his household lived in three executive mansions during his presidency:

Residence and location	Time span	Notes
Samuel Osgood House; 3 Cherry Street; New York, New York	April 23, 1789 – February 23, 1790	Congress leased the house from Samuel Osgood for a sum of $845 per year. Washington brought seven enslaved Africans from Mount Vernon to work in his New York presidential household.
Alexander Macomb House; 39–41 Broadway; New York, New York	February 23, 1790 – August 30, 1790	The "first family" moved into this larger and more conveniently located house when Elénor-François-Elie, Comte de Moustier returned to France.
President's House; 524–30 Market Street; Philadelphia, Pennsylvania	November 27, 1790 – March 10, 1797	Washington brought nine enslaved persons from Mount Vernon to work in his Philadelphia presidential household.

=== Tours ===
Washington made three major tours around the country. The first was to New England (1789), the second to Rhode Island and New York City (1790), and the third to the Southern states of Maryland, Virginia, Georgia, North Carolina, and South Carolina (1791). His main goals were to educate himself about "the principal character and internal circumstances" of the different regions of the country, as well as meet "well-informed persons, who might give him useful information and advice on political subjects."

Because he was himself from the South, Washington decided to visit the Northern states first. After Congress went into recess in September 1789, Washington traveled to New England, making his first stop in New Haven, Connecticut. Washington then traveled to Boston, where a large crowd greeted him. From Boston, Washington traveled north, stopping in Marblehead and Salem, Massachusetts. About a week after arriving in Boston, he traveled north to Portsmouth, New Hampshire, and circled back to New York, stopping in Waltham and Lexington. The trip was a success, serving to consolidate his popularity and improve his health. During his time in New England, Washington inspected possible sites for roads and canals and observed textile mills. After Rhode Island ratified the Constitution in 1790, Washington promptly took another tour to visit it. Along with Jefferson and New York governor George Clinton, he first stopped in Newport, Rhode Island, then traveled to Providence, Rhode Island.

In 1791, Washington toured the South, largely to promote national unity amid uproar over Hamilton's economic plan and slavery. The trip began on March 20, 1791, when Washington and a small group of aides began sailing down the Severn River. After sailing through a large storm, they arrived in Annapolis. From Annapolis they traveled to Mount Vernon, and from there to Colchester, Virginia, to Richmond, Virginia. After leaving Richmond, they went to Petersburg, then Greensville, Virginia. They left Virginia and went to Craven County, North Carolina, then New Bern. The group's last stop in North Carolina was Wilmington, after which they traveled to Georgetown, South Carolina, subsequently stopping in Charleston. Washington had never traveled south of North Carolina before 1791, and he was warmly received in Charleston. After South Carolina, Washington and his party arrived in Georgia, going to (among others) Augusta. In late May, the group turned around, stopping at many Revolutionary War battle sites and the Moravian community at Salem, North Carolina. On June 11, 1791, they arrived back at Mount Vernon. Washington's Southern tour also included two stops at the location of the Federal City to negotiate purchase of land and survey the site.

== States joining the Union ==
When the federal government began operations under the new form of government in the spring of 1789, two states—North Carolina and Rhode Island—were not yet members of the Union as neither had ratified the Constitution. Both did so while Washington was in office, thereby joining the Union: North Carolina, November 21, 1789; and Rhode Island, May 29, 1790. While North Carolina joined of its own accord, Rhode Island only joined the Union after the federal government threatened to break off trade relations.

Three new states were admitted to the Union (each on an equal footing with the existing states) while Washington was in office: Vermont, on March 4, 1791; (Note: Vermont declared itself an independent republic on January 17, 1777, during the American Revolutionary War, but its territory was claimed by the State of New York. Only when New York was induced to renounce its claim in exchange for financial remuneration; an agreement formally accepted by both jurisdictions as of October 28, 1790) was Statehood possible.) Kentucky, on June 1, 1792; (Note: Kentucky is one of 3 states that were set off from already existing states (Maine and West Virginia are the others). The Virginia General Assembly adopted legislation on December 18, 1789, separating its "District of Kentucky" from the rest of the State and approving its statehood.) and Tennessee, on June 1, 1796. (Note: Tennessee was the first state created from a U.S. territory, the Territory South of the River Ohio; previously, what would become Tennessee had been part of the State of North Carolina.)

== Farewell Address and election of 1796 ==
=== Farewell Address ===
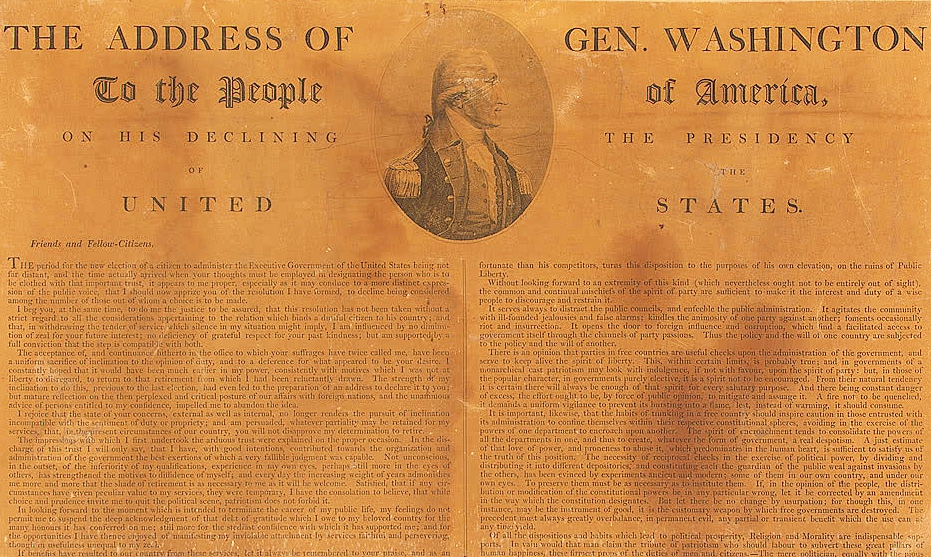
Washington's Farewell Address

As his second term entered its final year in 1796, Washington was exhausted from years of public service. Though he remained in fine mental condition, his physical health had begun to decline. He was also bothered by the constant attacks from the Democratic-Republican press, which had escalated after the signing of the Jay Treaty. Perhaps most importantly, Washington believed that he had accomplished his major goals as president. The nation had a stable economy, a strong grip over its Western territories, and peaceful relations with foreign powers. Against the wishes of most Federalists, who hoped that the president would seek re-election, Washington decided early in 1796 that he would retire unless compelled to run by a national emergency. He delayed a formal announcement until later in the year, but began drafting his Farewell Address.

As was the case with his 1783 decision to resign his military commission, Washington's decision to relinquish his political power voluntarily was momentous, as national leaders of that era in the western world rarely gave up their titles voluntarily. In making the announcement and then following through on it, Washington established a precedent for the democratic transfer of executive power. His departure from office after two terms set a pattern for subsequent U.S. presidents. (Note: From 1789 to 1940, U.S. presidents adhered to a self-imposed limit of two terms. The precedent was exceeded only once, by Franklin D. Roosevelt, who was elected to four terms, and served from 1933 through 1945. The 22nd Amendment, proposed and ratified following Franklin Roosevelt's presidency, provides that "No person shall be elected to the office of the President more than twice.")

In 1792, when Washington had considered retiring after one term, he turned to James Madison for help composing a "valedictory address" to the public. Now, four years later, he turned to Alexander Hamilton for guidance. Over several months, Hamilton and the president collaborated on the form and wording of the address. One of Hamilton's drafts included pointedly sharp criticism of the newspapers and the press of the day, something subsequently not included in the final, finished letter. The final product, wrote Hamilton biographer Marie Hecht, "was a true marriage of minds, the peak of amity and understanding between the two men." Most historians believe that while the language is primarily Hamilton's, the ideas are essentially Washington's. The address was published on September 19, 1796, in David Claypoole's American Daily Advertiser. It was immediately reprinted in newspapers and as a pamphlet throughout the United States.

Washington makes clear at the outset that he is not running for a third term, and then thanks his fellow citizens for the opportunity to serve as their president. He then writes about the preservation of the Union, the core of American nationhood and which, along with the Constitution, binds all Americans together and provides for the popular well-being. Concerned about the obstacles and potential hazards that lay ahead for the nation, Washington urges the nation's people to cherish and safeguard their hard-won system of republican government despite their many differences.

The unity of government which constitutes you one people is also now dear to you. It is justly so; for it is a main pillar in the edifice of your real independence, the support of your tranquility at home, your peace abroad, of your safety, of your prosperity, of that very liberty which you so highly prize. But as it is easy to foresee that, from different causes and from different quarters, much pains will be taken, many artifices employed, to weaken in your minds the conviction of this truth; as this is the point in your political fortress against which the batteries of internal and external enemies will be most constantly and actively (though often covertly and insidiously) directed, it is of infinite moment that you should properly estimate the immense value of your national Union to your collective and individual happiness; that you should cherish a cordial, habitual, and immovable attachment to it; accustoming yourselves to think and speak of it as of the palladium of your political safety and prosperity; watching for its preservation with jealous anxiety; discountenancing whatever may suggest even a suspicion that it can in any event be abandoned; and indignantly frowning upon the first dawning of every attempt to alienate any portion of our country from the rest, or to enfeeble the sacred ties which now link together the various parts.

The address is largely a statement of his policies while in office, with some comments mixed in to highlight certain points, in which he builds a case for the steps needed to perpetuate the union, a concept that began to germinate among and between the states during the Revolutionary War. In doing so he lifts a well-formed and functioning Constitution (the rule of law), along with the proper habits and dispositions (both intellectual and religious) of the people as essential. Washington also lays out the greatest threats he sees to the Union, warning Americans to distrust the passions of political factionalism, be wary of foreign interference in the nation's domestic affairs, and avoid an entangling foreign policy.

After Washington died in 1799, the address was reprinted in newspapers and included in schoolbooks and collections of Washington's writings and biographies throughout the country. A quarter-century later, both Jefferson and Madison placed it on the primary reading list at the University of Virginia, describing it as one of the "best guides" to the "distinctive principles" of American government. It became one of the "great state papers of American history", often read in classrooms and other venues long after Washington left office. The U.S. Senate observes Washington's Birthday (February 22) each year by selecting one of its members, alternating parties, to read the address in the legislative session.

Today the address is primarily remembered for its words concerning non-involvement in European wars and politics. For much of the 19th century, the expanse of the Atlantic and Pacific Oceans had made it possible for the U.S. to enjoy a kind of "free security" and remain largely detached from Old World conflicts, and social conventions made international travel by incumbent politicians taboo. The restriction began to erode and break down in the early 20th century, as policy makers at the federal level began to reevaluate the nation's role in international affairs. The first international presidential trip was made in 1906 by Theodore Roosevelt, and subsequently, during World War I, Woodrow Wilson made a case for U.S. intervention in the conflict and a U.S. interest in maintaining a peaceful world order. Since then, the U.S. has signed numerous treaties of alliance with foreign nations.

=== Election of 1796 ===
Washington's announcement on September 19, 1796, that he would not be a candidate for a third term was, in the words of congressman Fisher Ames, "a signal, like dropping a hat, for the party racers to start." During the ensuing ten weeks, partisans from both factions sprang into action in an intensive and focused effort to influence the outcome of the electoral vote. Like the previous two presidential elections, no candidates were put forward for voters to choose between in 1796. The Constitution provided for the selection of electors, (Note: In seven states presidential electors were chosen by voters. In the remaining nine states, they were chosen by the state's legislature.) who would then elect a president. The clear favorite of Democratic-Republicans was Thomas Jefferson, although he was very reluctant to run. John Adams was the choice of a large majority of the Federalists.

The Democratic-Republicans in Congress held a nominating caucus and named Jefferson and Aaron Burr as their presidential choices. Jefferson at first declined the nomination, but he agreed to run a few weeks later. Federalist members of Congress held an informal nominating caucus and named Adams and Thomas Pinckney as their candidates for president. The campaign was, for the most part, unorganized and sporadic, confined to newspaper attacks, pamphlets and political rallies; of the four contenders, only Burr actively campaigned.

In early November, France's ambassador to the U.S., Pierre Adet, inserted himself into the political debate on behalf of Jefferson, publishing statements designed to arouse anti-British sentiment and to leave the impression that a Jefferson victory would result in improved relations with France. Then, late in the campaign, Alexander Hamilton, desiring "a more pliant president than Adams", maneuvered to tip the election to Pinckney. He coerced South Carolina Federalist electors, who pledged to vote for "favorite son" Pinckney, to scatter their second votes among candidates other than Adams. Hamilton's scheme was undone when several New England state electors heard of it, conferred, and agreed not to vote for Pinckney.

The electoral votes were counted during a Joint Session of Congress on February 8, 1797; Adams won the presidency by a narrow margin, garnering 71 electoral votes to 68 for Jefferson (who became the vice president). The balance of the Electoral College votes were dispersed among: Thomas Pinckney (59), Aaron Burr (30), Samuel Adams (15), Oliver Ellsworth (11), George Clinton (7), John Jay (5), James Iredell (3), John Henry (2), Samuel Johnston (2), George Washington (2), and C. C. Pinckney (1).

== Historical evaluation ==
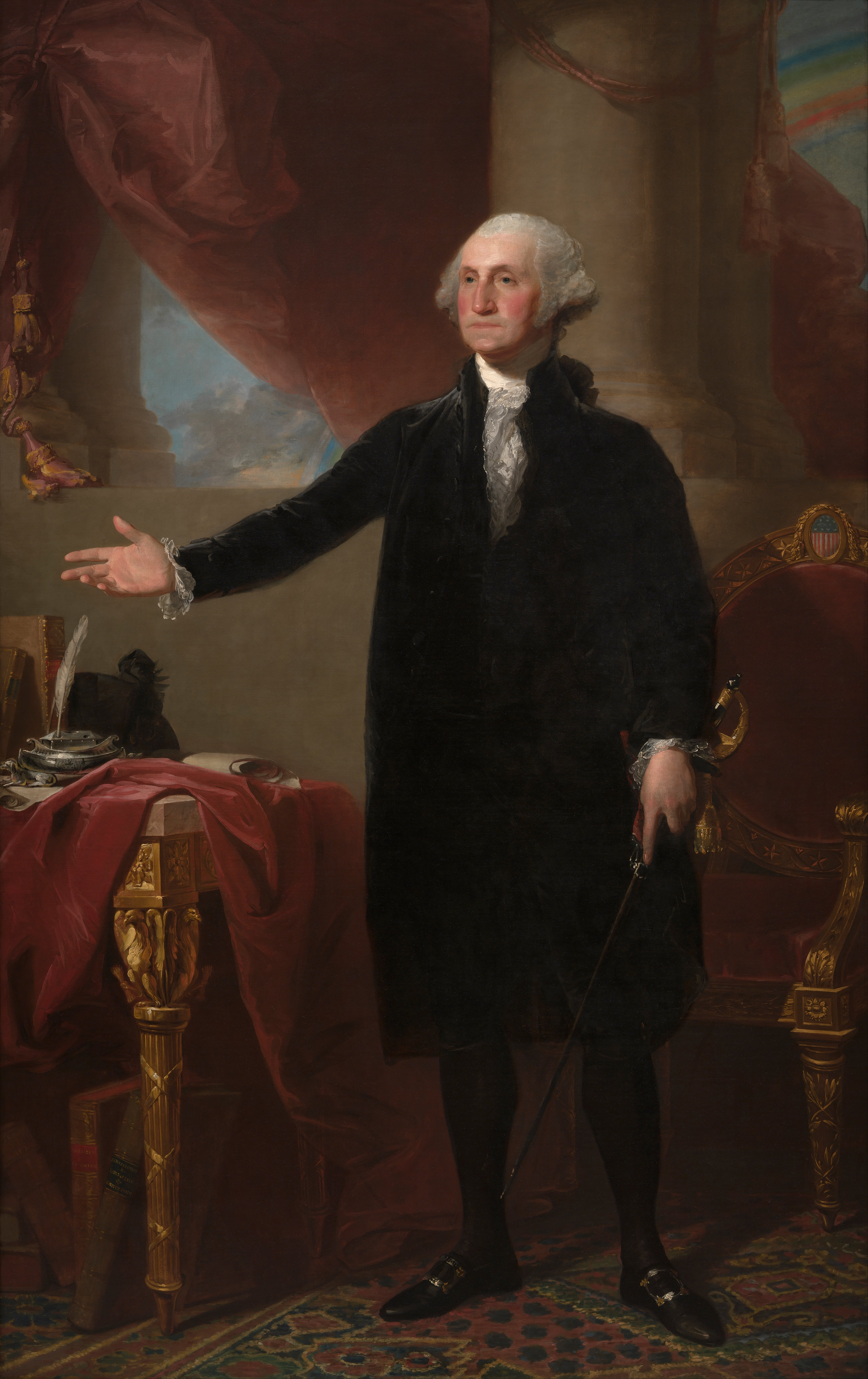
The Lansdowne Portrait by Gilbert Stuart (1796)

George Washington's presidency has generally been viewed as one of the most successful, and he is often considered to be one of the three greatest American presidents ever. When historians began ranking the presidents in 1948, Washington ranked second in Arthur M. Schlesinger Sr.'s poll, and has subsequently been ranked 3rd in the Riders-McIver Poll (1996), 2nd in the 2017 survey by C-SPAN, and 3rd in the American Political Science Association's 2024 poll.

More than 900 books have been written about Washington. Forrest McDonald concluded that "George Washington was indispensable, but only for what he was, not for what he did. He was the symbol of the presidency [but]... Washington had done little in his own right, had often opposed the best measures of his subordinates, and had taken credit for his achievements that he had no share in bringing about." By contrast, in his piece on Washington, Stephen Knott wrote "Literally the 'Father of the Nation,' Washington almost single-handedly created a new government—shaping its institutions, offices, and political practices...Washington's profound achievements built the foundations of a powerful national government that has survived for more than two centuries." Knotts adds that historians generally consider Washington's inability to prevent the outbreak of heated partisan battles to be his greatest failure. Ron Chernow considers Washington's presidency to be "simply breathtaking", writing:

He had restored American credit and assumed state debt; created a bank, a mint, a coast guard, a customs service, and a diplomatic corps; introduced the first accounting, tax, and budgetary procedures; maintained peace at home and abroad; inaugurated a navy, bolstered the army, and shored up coastal defenses and infrastructure; proved that the country could regulate commerce and negotiate binding treaties; protected frontier settlers, subdued Indian uprisings, and established law and order amid rebellion, scrupulously adhering all the while to the letter of the Constitution ... Most of all he had shown a disbelieving world that republican government could prosper without being spineless or disorderly or reverting to authoritarian rule.

== See also ==
- Federalist Era, the period of American history during which Washington and John Adams served as President
- List of George Washington articles
- Timeline of drafting and ratification of the United States Constitution, covers pertinent events from 1785 to 1791

== Bibliography ==
- Alden, John R. (1993). George Washington, a Biography. Norwalk: Easton Press. ISBN 9780807141083.
- Allen, Gardner Weld (1909). Our Naval War With France. Boston: Houghton, Mifflin and Company. OCLC 1202325. "naval war with france."
- Allen, Gardner Weld (2010) [1905]. Our Navy and the Barbary Corsairs. Boston: Houghton, Mifflin and Company. ISBN 9781371980283. OCLC 911176707.
- Allen, William C. (2001). History of the United States Capitol – A Chronicle of Design, Construction, and Politics. Washington, DC: Government Printing Office. ISBN 0-16-050830-4. Archived from the original on December 16, 2008.
- Bailey, David M.; Kennedy, Lizabeth; Cohen, Thomas A. (2006). The American pageant: a history of the Republic (13th ed.). Boston: Houghton Mifflin. ISBN 0-618-47927-9.
- Baker, William Spohn (1897). Washington After the Revolution: 1784–1799. p. 118. OCLC 34797089. "george washington Samuel Osgood House april 23-february 23."
- Barnes, Celia (2003). Native American Power in the United States, 1783–1795. Teaneck, Madison, New Jersey: Fairleigh Dickinson University Press. ISBN 0-8386-3958-5.
- Bartoloni-Tuazon, Kathleen (2014). For Fear of an Elective King: George Washington and the Presidential Title Controversy of 1789. Ithaca, New York: Cornell University Press. ISBN 978-0-8014-5298-7.
- Beer, Samuel H. (1987). "Chapter 6: The Idea of the Nation". In Goldwin, Robert A.; Schambra, William A. (eds.). How Federal is the Constitution?. Volume five in the AEI series "A Decade of Study of the Constitution". Washington, D.C.: American Enterprise Institute for Public Policy Research. pp. 109–121. ISBN 0-8447-3619-8.
- Bellfy, Philip C. (2011). Three Fires Unity: The Anishnaabeg of the Lake Huron Borderlands. Lincoln, Nebraska: University of Nebraska Press. ISBN 978-0-8032-1348-7.
- Bordewich, Fergus M. (2016). The First Congress. New York: Simon & Schuster. ISBN 978-1-45169193-1.
- Boyd, Steven R. (1994). "Chapter 5: The Whiskey Rebellion, Popular Rights, and the Meaning of the First Amendment". In Mainwaring, W. Thomas (ed.). The Whiskey Rebellion and the Trans-Appalachian Frontier. Washington, Pennsylvania: Washington and Jefferson College. pp. 73–84. OCLC 32005769.
- Chardavoyne, David Gardner (2012). United States District Court for the Eastern District of Michigan: People, Law, and Politics. Detroit, Michigan: Wayne State University Press. ISBN 978-0-8143-3720-2.
- Chernow, Ron (2004). Alexander Hamilton. City of Westminster, London, England: Penguin Books. ISBN 1-59420-009-2.
- Chernow, Ron (2010). Washington: A Life. London: Penguin Press. ISBN 978-1-59420-266-7.; online book review
- Combs, Jerald A. (1970). The Jay Treaty: Political Battleground of the Founding Fathers. Berkeley, California: University of California Press. ISBN 0-520-01573-8. LCCN 70-84044.
- Craughwell, Thomas J.; Phelps, M. William (2008). Failures of the Presidents: From the Whiskey Rebellion and War of 1812 to the Bay of Pigs and War in Iraq. Beverly, Massachusetts: Fair Winds Press. ISBN 9780785830542.
- Crew, Harvey W.; Webb, William Bensing; Wooldridge, John, eds. (2015) [1892]. Centennial History of the City of Washington, D. C.: With Full Outline of the Natural Advantages, Accounts of the Indian Tribes, Selection of the Site, Founding of the City ... to the Present Time. Dayton, Ohio: United Brethern Publishing House. ISBN 978-1343986381. OCLC 612798983.
- Daughan, George C. (2008). If By Sea: The Forging of the American Navy – From the American Revolution to the War of 1812. New York: Basic Books. ISBN 978-0-465-01607-5. OCLC 190876973.
- Elkins, Stanley; McKitrick, Eric (1995). The Age of Federalism: The Early American Republic, 1788–1800. New York City: Oxford University Press. ISBN 978-0-19-509381-0.
- Ellis, Joseph (2016). "George Washington". In Gormley, Ken (ed.). The Presidents and the Constitution: A Living History. New York: New York University Press Press. pp. 17–33. ISBN 9781479839902.
- Ellis, Joseph J. (2000). Founding Brothers: The Revolutionary Generation. New York: Alfred A. Knopf. ISBN 0-375-40544-5.
- Ferling, John (2003). A Leap in the Dark: The Struggle to Create the American Republic. New York: Oxford University Press. ISBN 0-19-515924-1.
- Ferling, John (2009). The Ascent of George Washington: The Hidden Political Genius of an American Icon. New York: Bloomsbury Press. ISBN 978-1-59691-465-0.
- Fowler, William M. (1984). Jack Tars and Commodores: The American Navy, 1783–1815. Boston: Houghton Mifflin. ISBN 0-395-35314-9. OCLC 10277756.
- Harrison, Lowell H. (1992). Kentucky's Road to Statehood. Lexington, Kentucky: The University Press of Kentucky. ISBN 0-8131-1782-8.
- Herring, George (2008). From Colony to Superpower: U.S. Foreign Relations Since 1776. New York: Oxford University Press. ISBN 978-0-19-507822-0.
- Hoadley, John F. (1986). Origins of American Political Parties: 1789--1803. Lexington, Kentucky: University Press of Kentucky. ISBN 978-0-8131-5320-9.
- Hogeland, William (2006). The Whiskey Rebellion: George Washington, Alexander Hamilton, and the Frontier Rebels Who Challenged America's Newfound Sovereignty. New York: Simon & Schuster. ISBN 0-7432-5490-2.
- Howarth, Steven (1999). To Shining Sea: A History of the United States Navy, 1775–1998. Norman, Oklahoma: University of Oklahoma Press. ISBN 0806130261.
- Hunt, Alfred N. (1988). Haiti's Influence on Antebellum America: Slumbering Volcano in the Caribbean. Baton Rouge: Louisiana State Univ Press. ISBN 0-8071-1370-0.
- Ifft, Richard A. (1985). "Treason in the Early Republic: The Federal Courts, Popular Protest, and Federalism During the Whiskey Insurrection". In Boyd, Steven R. (ed.). The Whiskey Rebellion: Past and Present Perspectives. Westport, Connecticut: Greenwood Press. pp. 165–182. ISBN 0-313-24534-7. OCLC 11291120.
- Kent, Charles A. (1918) [Reprinted from the Journal of the Illinois State Historical Society, v. 10, no. 4]. The Treaty of Greenville August 3, 1795. Springfield, Illinois: Schnepp and Barnes. LCCN 19013726. 13608—50.
- Maier, Pauline (2010). Ratification: The People Debate the Constitution, 1787–1788. New York: Simon & Schuster. ISBN 978-0-684-86854-7.
- McDonald, Forrest (1974). The Presidency of George Washington. American Presidency. Lawrence, Kansas: University Press of Kansas. ISBN 978-0-7006-0359-6.
- Meacham, Jon (2012). Thomas Jefferson: The Art of Power. New York City: Random House. ISBN 978-1-4000-6766-4.
- Miller, John C. (1960). The Federalist Era, 1789–1801. New York: Harper & Brothers. LCCN 60-15321 – via Universal Digital Library (2004-04-24).
- Miller, Nathan (1997). The U.S. Navy: A History (3rd ed.). Annapolis, Maryland: Naval Institute Press. ISBN 1-55750-595-0. OCLC 37211290.
- Morison, Samuel Eliot (1965). The Oxford History of the American People. New York: Oxford University Press. LCCN 65-12468.
- Schecter, Barnet (2010). George Washington's America. A Biography Through His Maps. New York: Walker & Company. ISBN 978-0-8027-1748-1.
- Sharp, James Roger (1993). American Politics in the Early Republic: The New Nation in Crisis. New Haven, Connecticut: Yale University Press. ISBN 0-300-06519-1.
- Slaughter, Thomas P. (1986). The Whiskey Rebellion: Frontier Epilogue to the American Revolution. New York City: Oxford University Press. ISBN 0-19-505191-2.
- Smith, Page (1962). John Adams. Vol. II 1784–1826. New York City: Doubleday. LCCN 63-7188. OCLC 36883390.
- Spaulding, Matthew (2001). "Chapter 2: The Command of its own Fortunes: Reconsidering Washington's Farewell address". In Fishman, Ethan M.; Pederson, William D.; Rozell, Mark J. (eds.). George Washington: Foundation of Presidential Leadership and Character. Westport, Connecticut: Praeger. pp. 19–32. ISBN 0-275-96868-5. LCCN 00-069857.
- Unger, Harlow (2015). "Mr. President": George Washington and the Making of the Nation's Highest Office (paperback ed.). Cambridge, Massachusetts: Da Capo Press. ISBN 978-0-306-82353-4.
- Vile, John R. (2005). The Constitutional Convention of 1787: A Comprehensive Encyclopedia of America's Founding (Volume 1: A-M). Santa Barbara, California: ABC-CLIO. ISBN 1-85109-669-8.
- Wood, Gordon S. (2006). Revolutionary Characters. London: Penguin Press. ISBN 978-1-59420-093-9.
- Wood, Gordon S. (2009). Empire of Liberty: A History of the Early Republic, 1789–1815. Oxford History of the United States. New York, New York: Oxford University Press. ISBN 978-0-19-503914-6.
