= History of taxation in the United States =

Federal taxes by type

The history of taxation in the United States begins with the colonial protest against British taxation policy in the 1760s, leading to the American Revolution. The independent nation collected taxes on imports ("tariffs"), whiskey, and (for a while) on glass windows. States and localities collected poll taxes on voters and property taxes on land and commercial buildings. In addition, there were the state and federal excise taxes. State and federal inheritance taxes began after 1900, while the states (but not the federal government) began collecting sales taxes in the 1930s. The United States imposed income taxes briefly during the Civil War and the 1890s. In 1913, the Sixteenth Amendment was ratified, allowing Congress to levy an income tax on individuals and entities.

== Colonial taxation ==
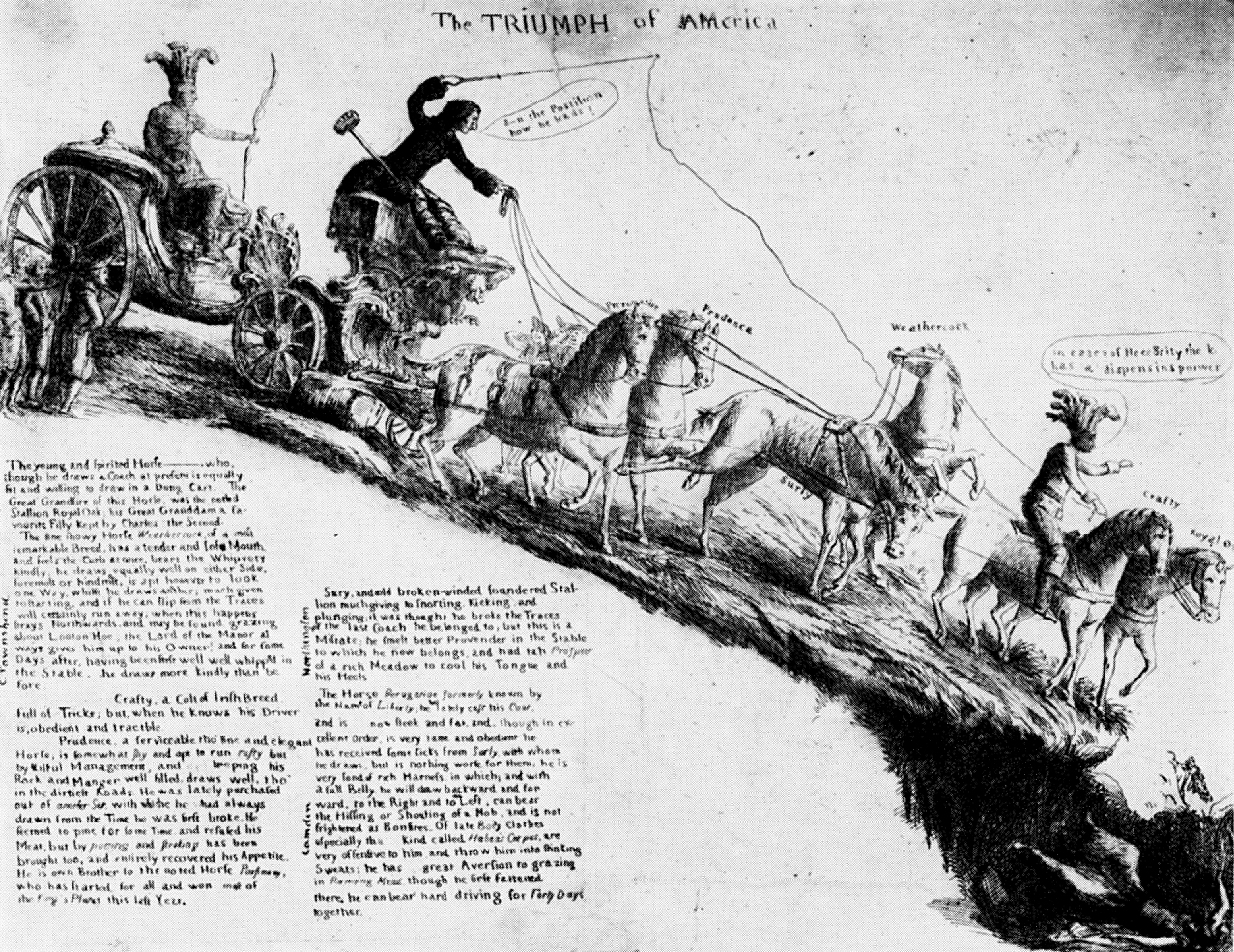
A British newspaper cartoon reacts to the repeal of the Stamp Act 1765.

As early as 1619, the Virginia General Assembly began administering poll taxes. English settlers agreed to pay quit-rent for using the land of the Virginia Company. By 1670s, more "grevious taxations & burthens". were levied on small farmers, merchants, indentured servants, and other commoners. Men who owned large tracts of land were often exempt from taxation by becoming an elected official. This discontent from the lower classes was one of the catalysts of the Declaration of the People of Virginia and Bacon's Rebellion in 1676. In the Carolinas, Culpeper's Rebellion was due to the taxation caused by the Navigation Acts.

Compared to the present day, taxes were low at the local, colonial, and imperial levels throughout the colonial era. The issue that led to the Revolution was whether Parliament had the right to impose taxes on the Americans when they were not represented in Parliament.

== Influential colonial taxation policies ==
=== Stamp Act 1765 ===
The Stamp Act 1765 was the fourth Stamp Act to be passed by the Parliament of Great Britain and required all legal documents, permits, commercial contracts, newspapers, wills, pamphlets, and playing cards in the American colonies to carry a tax stamp. It was enacted on November 1, 1765, at the end of the Seven Years' War between the French and the British, a war that started with the then-young George Washington attacking a French outpost. The stamp tax had the scope of defraying the cost of maintaining the military presence protecting the colonies. Americans rose in strong protest, arguing in terms of "No Taxation without Representation". Boycotts forced Britain to repeal the stamp tax, while convincing many British leaders it was essential to tax the colonists on something to demonstrate the sovereignty of Parliament.

=== Townshend Revenue Act ===
The Townshend Revenue Act were two tax laws passed by Parliament in 1767; they were proposed by Charles Townshend, Chancellor of the Exchequer. They placed a tax on common products imported into the American Colonies, such as lead, paper, paint, glass, and tea. In contrast to the Stamp Act 1765, the laws were not a direct tax that people paid daily, but a tax on imports that was collected from the ship's captain when he unloaded the cargo. The Townshend Acts also created three new admiralty courts to try Americans who ignored the laws.

=== Sugar Act 1764 ===
The tax on sugar, cloth, and coffee. These were non-British exports.

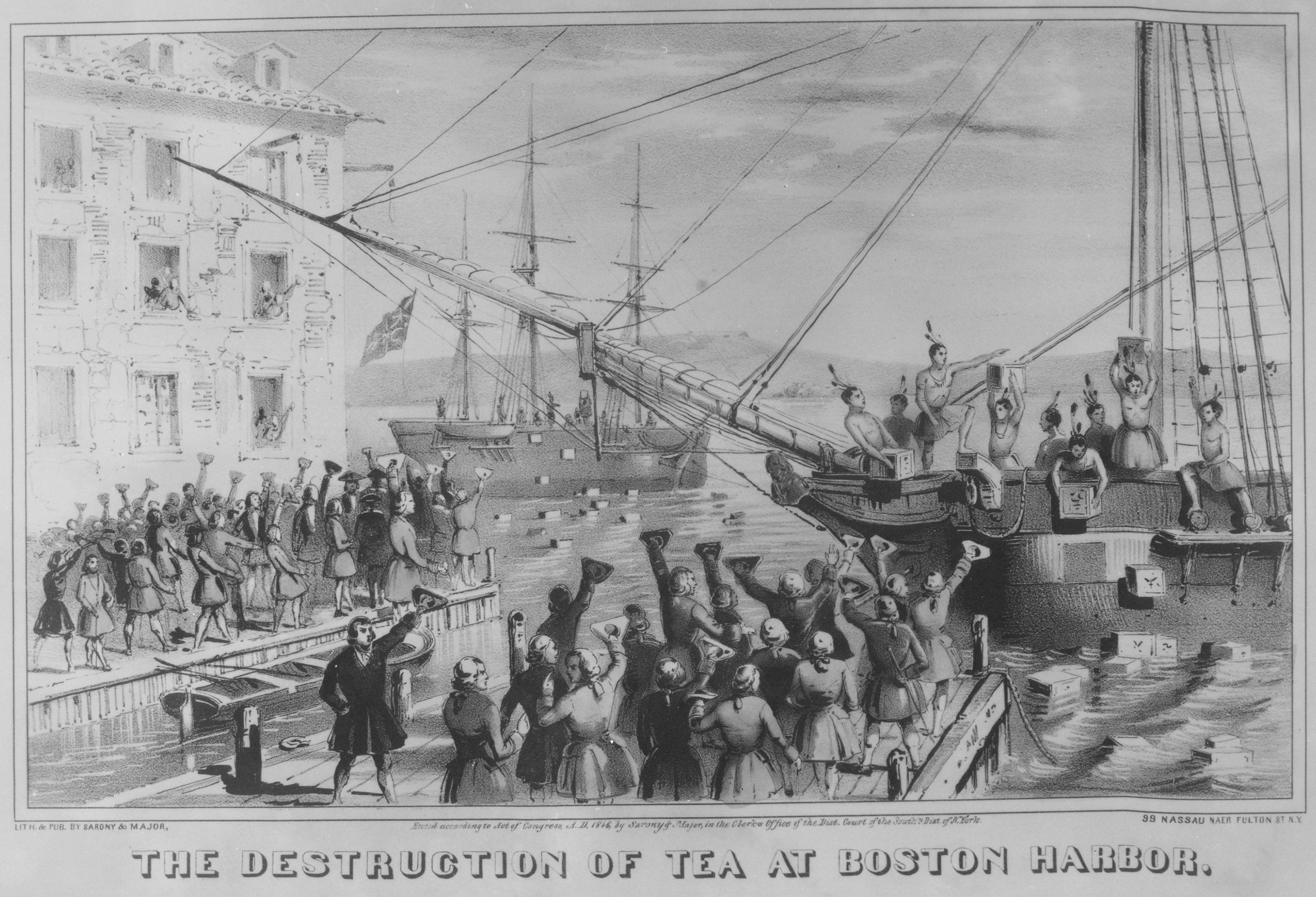
This 1846 lithograph has become a classic image of the Boston Tea Party.

=== Boston Tea Party ===
The Boston Tea Party was an act of protest by the Sons of Liberty against Parliament's Tea Act in which they dumped many chests of tea into Boston Harbor. The cuts to taxation on tea undermined American smugglers, who destroyed the tea in retaliation for its exemption from taxes. Parliament reacted harshly, and the conflict escalated to war in 1775.

== Capitation tax ==
Capitation taxes, also known as poll taxes, were initially created in the 1890s. Poll taxes are a fixed tax on individuals, regardless of income; voters must pay the tax before they are permitted to cast a ballot. These taxes were occasionally paired with literacy tests to prove qualification to vote.

Revenue from poll taxes acted as a major source of funding for state governments. To increase this revenue, poll taxes were also frequently extended to the process of obtaining hunting, fishing, and driving licenses.

Poll taxes were a prerequisite to voting registration in many states. Often, legislatures required the tax to be paid on a day separate from the polls. Voters were then required to bring proof of payment on election day. This caused issues for various workers that had to move frequently and were unable to maintain proper bookkeeping.

These taxes were widely utilized as a form of voter prevention in southern states after the abolition of slavery. They were introduced as part of the Jim Crow laws to deter black Americans from voting. However, capitation tax laws did not directly state a specific group of people and the tax requirements applied to all races and both sexes. Therefore, poll taxes were also often used to discriminate against women who attempted to vote. Some poor white male voters were deemed exempt from poll taxes via grandfather clause if they had an ancestor who could vote prior to the Civil War.

The Twenty-Fourth Amendment terminated the use of poll taxes in federal elections in 1964. Alabama, Arkansas, Mississippi, Texas, and Virginia continued to utilize poll taxes for state elections until Harper v. Virginia Board of Elections, a U.S. Supreme Court case held in 1966. The court ruled that capitation taxes enforced in state elections are also unconstitutional.

== Tariffs ==
=== Income for federal government ===
Tariffs have played different parts in trade policy and the economic history of the United States. Tariffs were the largest source of federal revenue from the 1790s to the eve of World War I until it was surpassed by income taxes. Since the revenue from the tariff was considered essential and easy to collect at the major ports, it was agreed the nation should have a tariff for revenue purposes.

=== Protectionism ===
Another role the tariff played was in the protection of local industry; it was the political dimension of the tariff. From the 1790s to the present day, the tariff (and closely related issues such as import quotas and trade treaties) generated enormous political stresses. These stresses lead to the Nullification crisis during the 19th century, and the creation of the World Trade Organization.

==== Origins of protectionism ====
When Alexander Hamilton was the United States Secretary of the Treasury he issued the Report on Manufactures, which reasoned that applying tariffs in moderation, in addition to raising revenue to fund the federal government, would also encourage domestic manufacturing and growth of the economy by applying the funds raised in part towards subsidies (called bounties in his time) to manufacturers. The main purposes sought by Hamilton through the tariff were to: (1) protect American infant industry for a short term until it could compete; (2) raise revenue to pay the expenses of government; (3) raise revenue to directly support manufacturing through bounties (subsidies). This resulted in the passage of three tariffs by Congress, the Tariff of 1789, the Tariff of 1790, and the Tariff of 1792 which progressively increased tariffs.

==== Sectionalism ====
Tariffs contributed to sectionalism between the North and the South. The Tariff of 1824 increased tariffs to protect the American industry in the face of cheaper imported commodities such as iron products, wool, and cotton textiles, and agricultural goods from England. This tariff was the first in which the sectional interests of the North and the South truly came into conflict because the South advocated lower tariffs to take advantage of tariff reciprocity from England and other countries that purchased raw agricultural materials from the South.

The Tariff of 1828, also known as the Tariff of Abominations, and the Tariff of 1832 accelerated sectionalism between the North and the South. For a brief moment in 1832, South Carolina made vague threats to leave the Union over the tariff issue. In 1833, to ease North-South relations, Congress lowered the tariffs. In the 1850s, the South gained greater influence over tariff policy and made subsequent reductions.

In 1861, just before the Civil War, Congress enacted the Morrill Tariff, which applied high rates and inaugurated a period of relatively continuous trade protection in the United States that lasted until the Underwood Tariff of 1913. The schedule of the Morrill Tariff and its two successor bills were retained long after the end of the Civil War.

==== Early 20th century protectionism ====
In 1921, Congress sought to protect local agriculture as opposed to the industry bypassing the Emergency Tariff, which increased rates on wheat, sugar, meat, wool and other agricultural products brought into the United States from foreign nations, which protected domestic producers of those items.

However, one year later Congress passed another tariff, the Fordney–McCumber Tariff, which applied the scientific tariff and the American Selling Price. The purpose of the scientific tariff was to equalize production costs among countries so that no country could undercut the prices charged by American companies. The difference in production costs was calculated by the Tariff Commission. A second novelty was the American Selling Price. This allowed the president to calculate the duty based on the price of the American price of a good, not the imported good.

During the outbreak of the Great Depression in 1930, Congress raised tariffs via the Smoot–Hawley Tariff Act on over 20,000 imported goods to record levels, and, in the opinion of most economists, worsened the Great Depression by causing other countries to reciprocate, thereby plunging American imports and exports by more than half.

==== Era of GATT and WTO ====
In 1948, the US signed the General Agreement on Tariffs and Trade (GATT), which reduced tariff barriers and other quantitative restrictions and subsidies on trade through a series of agreements.

In 1993, the GATT was updated (GATT 1994) to include new obligations upon its signatories. One of the most significant changes was the creation of the World Trade Organization (WTO). Whereas GATT was a set of rules agreed upon by nations, the WTO is an institutional body. The WTO expanded its scope from traded goods to trade within the service sector and intellectual property rights. Although it was designed to serve multilateral agreements, during several rounds of GATT negotiations (particularly the Tokyo Round) plurilateral agreements created selective trading and caused fragmentation among members. WTO arrangements are generally a multilateral agreement settlement mechanism of GATT.

== Excise tax ==
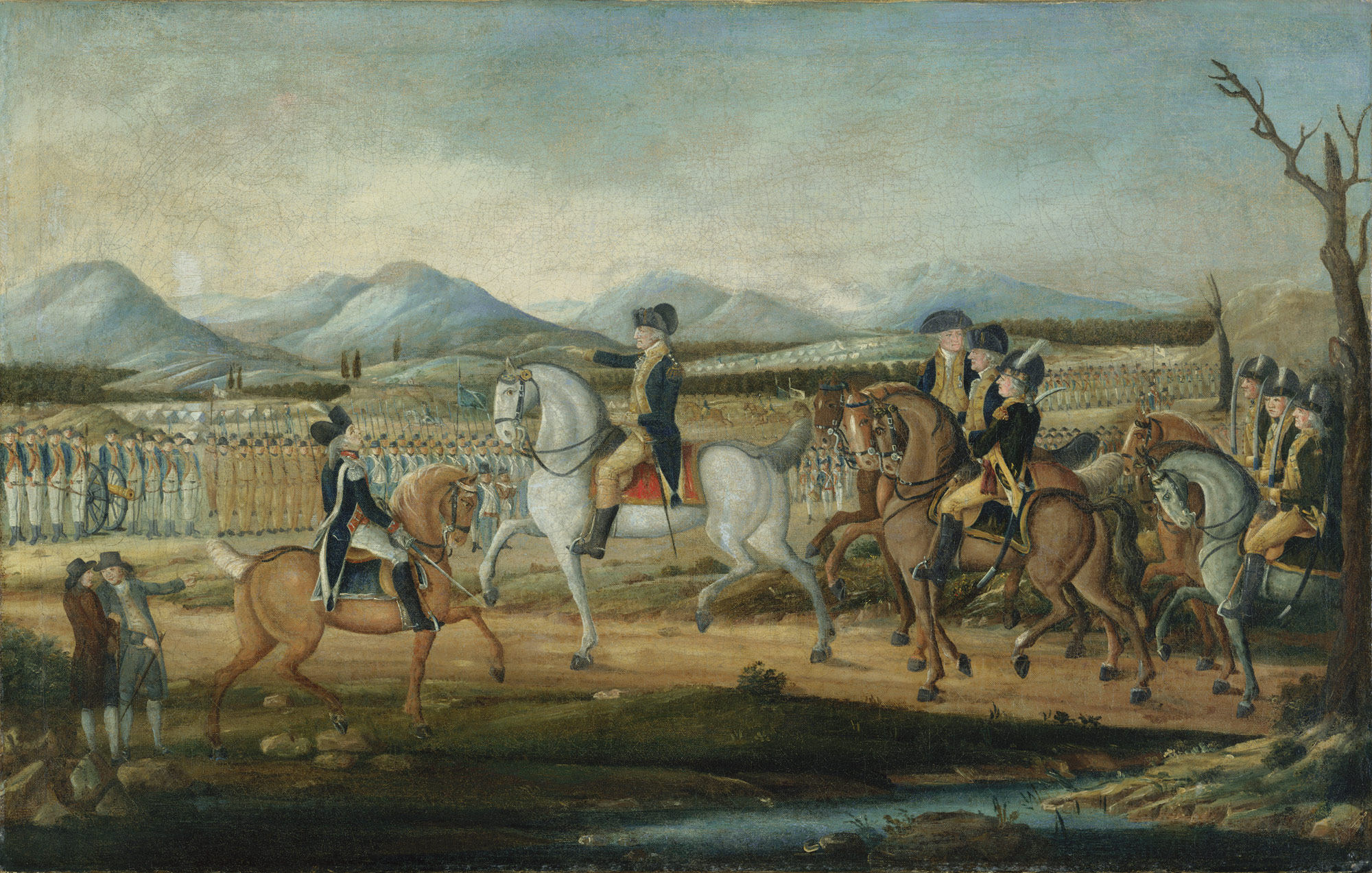
The Whiskey Rebellion: The painting depicts George Washington and his troops near Fort Cumberland, Maryland, before their march to suppress the Whiskey Rebellion in western Pennsylvania.

Federal excise taxes are applied to specific items such as motor fuels, tires, telephone usage, tobacco products, and alcoholic beverages. Excise taxes are often, but not always, allocated to special funds related to the object or activity taxed.

During the presidency of George Washington, Alexander Hamilton proposed a tax on distilled spirits to fund his policy of assuming the war debt of the American Revolution for those states which had failed to pay. After a vigorous debate, the House decided by a vote of 35–21 to approve legislation imposing a seven-cent-per-gallon excise tax on whiskey. This marks the first time in American history that Congress voted to tax an American product; this led to the Whiskey Rebellion.

== Income tax ==
Federal, State, and Local income tax GDP

The history of income taxation in the United States began in the 19th century with the imposition of income taxes to fund war efforts. However, the constitutionality of income taxation was widely held in doubt (see Pollock v. Farmers' Loan & Trust Co.) until 1913 with the ratification of the 16th Amendment.

=== Legal foundations ===
Article I, Section 8, Clause 1 of the United States Constitution assigns Congress the power to impose "Taxes, Duties, Imposts, and Excises", but the same clause also requires that "Duties, Imposts, and Excises shall be uniform throughout the United States".

In addition, the Constitution specifically limited Congress' ability to impose direct taxes, by requiring it to distribute direct taxes in proportion to each state's census population. It was thought that head taxes and property taxes (slaves could be taxed as either or both) were likely to be abused and that they bore no relation to the activities in which the federal government had a legitimate interest. The fourth clause of section 9, therefore, specifies that "No Capitation, or other direct, Tax shall be laid, unless in Proportion to the Census or enumeration herein before directed to be taken".

Taxation was also the subject of Federalist No. 33 penned secretly by the Federalist Alexander Hamilton under the pseudonym Publius. In it, he explains that the wording of the "Necessary and Proper" clause should serve as guidelines for the legislation of laws regarding taxation. The legislative branch is to be the judge, but any abuse of those powers of judging can be overturned by the people, whether as states or as a larger group.

What seemed to be a straightforward limitation on the power of the legislature based on the subject of the tax proved inexact and unclear when applied to an income tax, which can be arguably viewed either as a direct or an indirect tax. The courts have generally held that direct taxes are limited to taxes on people (variously called "capitation", "poll tax" or "head tax") and property. All other taxes are commonly referred to as "indirect taxes".

=== Pre-Sixteenth Amendment ===
To help pay for its war effort in the American Civil War, Congress imposed its first personal income tax in 1861. It was part of the Revenue Act of 1861 (3% of all incomes over US$800; rescinded in 1872). Congress also enacted the Revenue Act of 1862, which levied a 3% tax on incomes above $600, rising to 5% for incomes above $10,000. Rates were raised in 1864. This income tax was repealed in 1872.

A new income tax statute was enacted as part of the 1894 Tariff Act. At that time, the United States Constitution specified that Congress could impose a "direct" tax only if the law apportioned that tax among the states according to each state's census population.

In 1895, the United States Supreme Court ruled, in Pollock v. Farmers' Loan & Trust Co., that taxes on rents from real estate, on interest income from personal property and other income from personal property (which includes dividend income) were direct taxes on property and therefore had to be apportioned. Since the apportionment of income taxes is impractical, the Pollock rulings had the effect of prohibiting a federal tax on income from the property. Due to the political difficulties of taxing individual wages without taxing income from property, a federal income tax was impractical from the time of the Pollock decision until the time of ratification of the Sixteenth Amendment (below).

=== Sixteenth Amendment ===
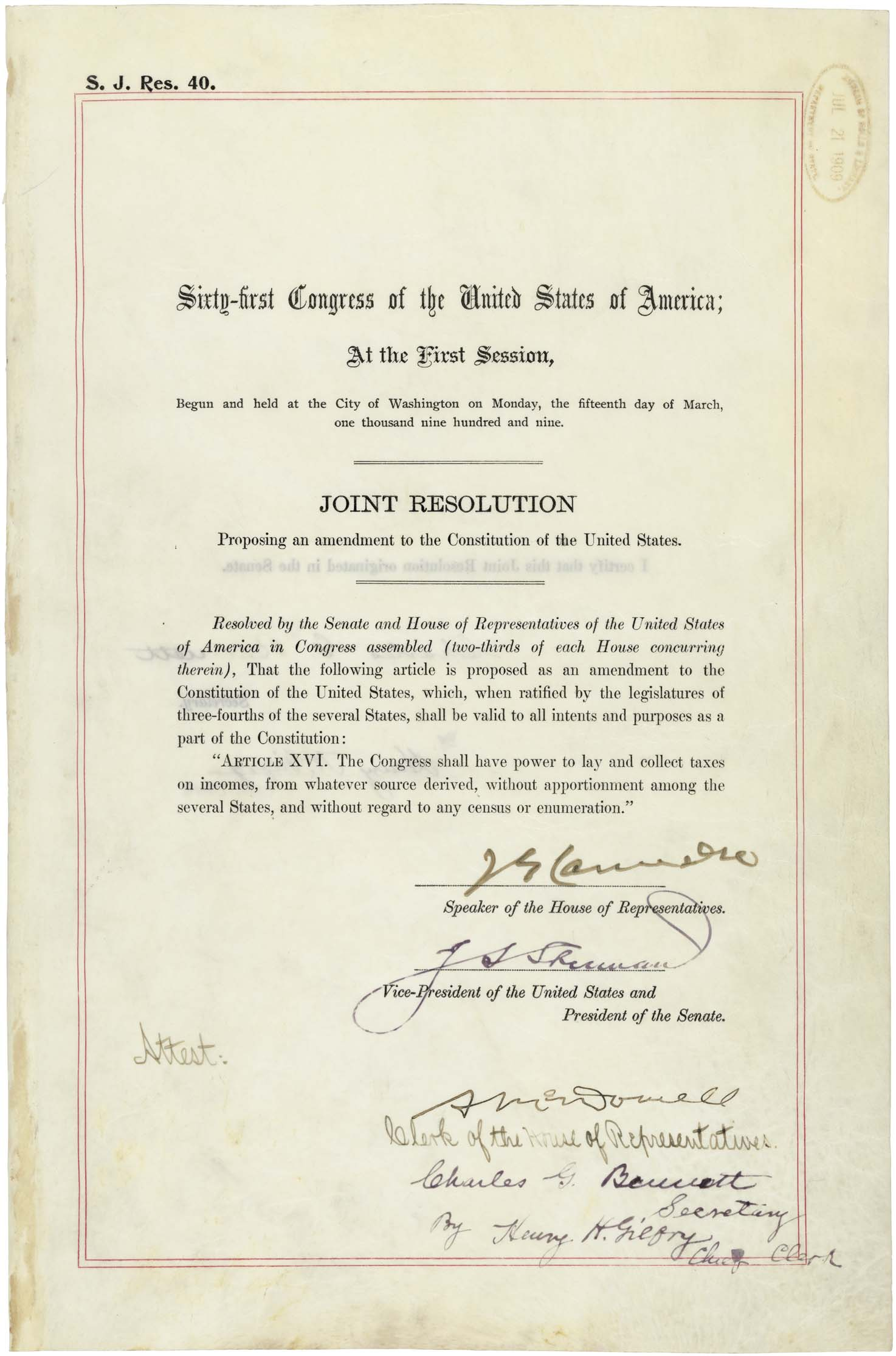
Sixteenth Amendment in the National Archives

In response to the Supreme Court decision in the Pollock case, Congress proposed the Sixteenth Amendment, which was ratified in 1913, and which states:

The Congress shall have the power to lay and collect taxes on incomes, from whatever source derived, without apportionment among the several States, and without regard to any census or enumeration.

The Supreme Court in Brushaber v. Union Pacific Railroad, 240 U.S. 1 (1916), indicated that the Sixteenth Amendment did not expand the federal government's existing power to tax income (meaning profit or gain from any source) but rather removed the possibility of classifying an income tax as a direct tax based on the source of the income. The Amendment removed the need for the income tax on interest, dividends, and rents to be apportioned among the states based on population. Income taxes are required, however, to abide by the law of geographical uniformity.

Congress enacted an income tax in October 1913 as part of the Revenue Act of 1913, levying a 1% tax on net personal incomes above $3,000, with a 6% surtax on incomes above $500,000. By 1918, the top rate of the income tax was increased to 77% (on income over $1,000,000, equivalent of $16,717,815 in 2018 dollars). The average rate for the (unspecified) "very rich" however, was 15%. The rate was increased in 1917 during World War I. The top marginal tax rate was reduced to 58% in 1922, to 25% in 1925 and finally to 24% in 1929. In 1932 the top marginal tax rate was increased to 63% during the Great Depression and steadily increased, reaching 94% in 1944 (on income over $200,000, equivalent of $2,868,625 in 2018 dollars). During World War II, Congress introduced payroll withholding and quarterly tax payments.

=== Tax rate reductions ===
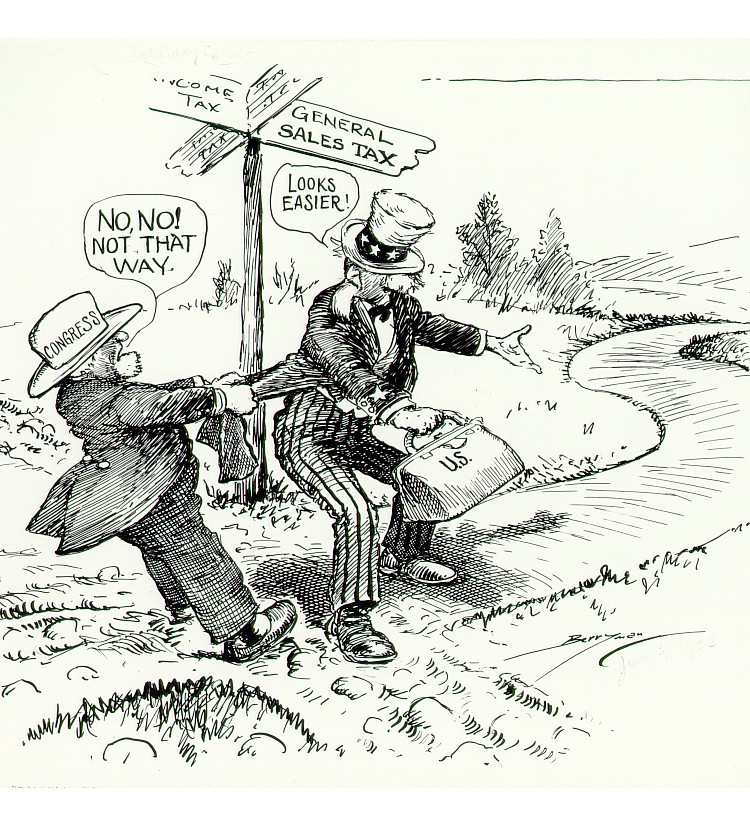
A comedic representation by Clifford K. Berryman of the debate to introduce a sales tax in the United States in 1933 and end the income tax

Following World War II tax increases, top marginal individual tax rates stayed near or above 90%, and the effective tax rate at 70% for the highest incomes (few paid the top rate), until 1964 when the top marginal tax rate was lowered to 70%. Kennedy explicitly called for a top rate of 65 percent, but added that it should be set at 70 percent if certain deductions were not phased out at the top of the income scale. The top marginal tax rate was lowered to 50% in 1982 and eventually to 28% in 1988. It slowly increased to 39.6% in 2000, then was reduced to 35% for the period 2003 through 2012. Corporate tax rates were lowered from 48% to 46% in 1981 (PL 97-34), then to 34% in 1986 (PL 99-514), and increased to 35% in 1993, subsequently lowered to 21% in 2018.

Timothy Noah, the senior editor of the New Republic, argues that while Ronald Reagan made massive reductions in the nominal marginal income tax rates with his Tax Reform Act of 1986, this reform did not make a similarly massive reduction in the effective tax rate on the higher marginal incomes. Noah writes in his ten-part series entitled "The Great Divergence," that in 1979, the effective tax rate on the top 0.01 percent of taxpayers was 42.9 percent, according to the Congressional Budget Office, but that by Reagan's last year in office it was 32.2%. This effective rate on high incomes held steadily until the first few years of the Clinton presidency when it increased to a peak high of 41%. However, it fell back down to the low 30s by his second term in the White House. This percentage reduction in the effective marginal income tax rate for the wealthiest Americans, 9%, is not a very large decrease in their tax burden, according to Noah, especially in comparison to the 20% drop in nominal rates from 1980 to 1981 and the 15% drop in nominal rates from 1986 to 1987. In addition to this small reduction in the income taxes of the wealthiest taxpayers in America, Noah discovered that the effective income tax burden for the bottom 20% of wage earners was 8% in 1979 and dropped to 6.4% under the Clinton Administration. This effective rate further dropped under the George W. Bush Administration. Under Bush, the rate decreased from 6.4% to 4.3%. These figures also correspond to an analysis of effective tax rates from 1979–2005 by the Congressional Budget Office.

=== Development of the modern income tax ===
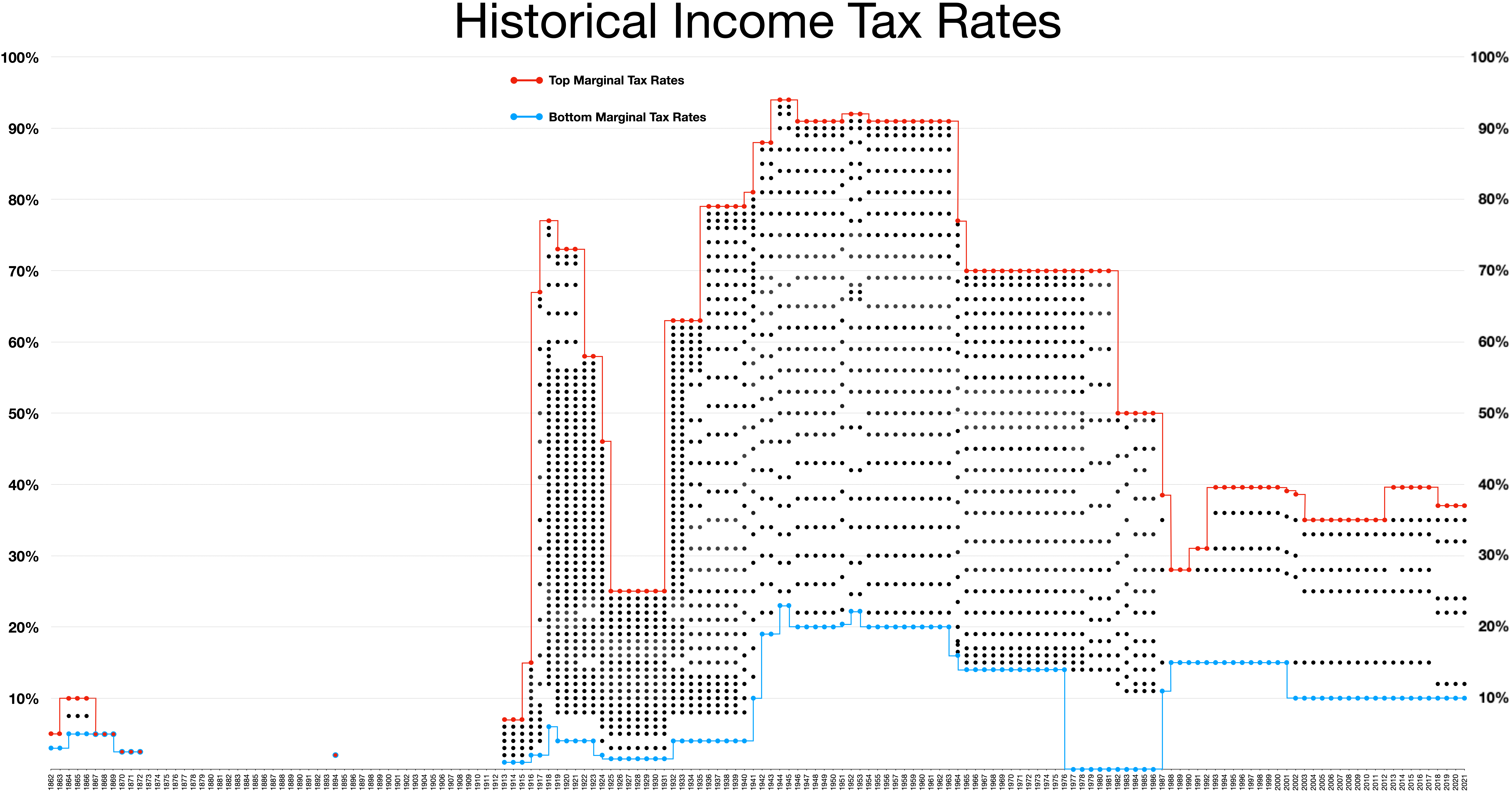
Top marginal income tax rates: Tax brackets; Lowest marginal income tax rates

Congress re-adopted the income tax in 1913, levying a 1% tax on net personal incomes above $3,000, with a 6% surtax on incomes above $500,000. By 1918, the top rate of the income tax was increased to 77% (on income over $1,000,000) to finance World War I. The top marginal tax rate was reduced to 58% in 1922, to 25% in 1925, and finally to 24% in 1929. In 1932 the top marginal tax rate was increased to 63% during the Great Depression and steadily increased.

During World War II, Congress introduced payroll withholding and quarterly tax payments. President Franklin D. Roosevelt proposed a 100% tax on all incomes over $25,000, stating that the success of the war effort required both revenue and public income equity. When Congress did not enact that proposal, Roosevelt issued an executive order attempting to achieve a similar result through a salary cap on certain salaries in connection with contracts between the private sector and the federal government. For tax years 1944 through 1951, the highest marginal tax rate for individuals was 91%, increasing to 92% for 1952 and 1953, and reverting to 91% 1954 through 1963.

For the 1964 tax year, the top marginal tax rate for individuals was lowered to 77%, and then to 70% for tax years 1965 through 1981. In 1978 income brackets were adjusted for inflation, so fewer people were taxed at high rates. The top marginal tax rate was lowered to 50% for tax years 1982 through 1986. Reagan undid 40% of his 1981 tax cut, in 1983 he hiked gas and payroll taxes, and in 1984 he raised tax revenue by closing loopholes for businesses. According to historian and domestic policy adviser Bruce Bartlett, Reagan's 12 tax increases over the course of his presidency took back half of the 1981 tax cut.

For tax year 1987, the highest marginal tax rate was 38.5% for individuals. It was lowered to 28% in revenue neutral fashion, eliminating many loopholes and shelters, along with in corporate taxes, (with a 33% "bubble rate") for tax years 1988 through 1990. Ultimately, the combination of base broadening and rate reduction raised revenue equal to about 4% of existing tax revenue

For the 1991 and 1992 tax years, the top marginal rate was increased to 31% in a budget deal President George H. W. Bush made with the Congress.

In 1993 the Clinton administration proposed and the Congress accepted (with no Republican support) an increase in the top marginal rate to 39.6% for the 1993 tax year, where it remained through the tax year 2000.

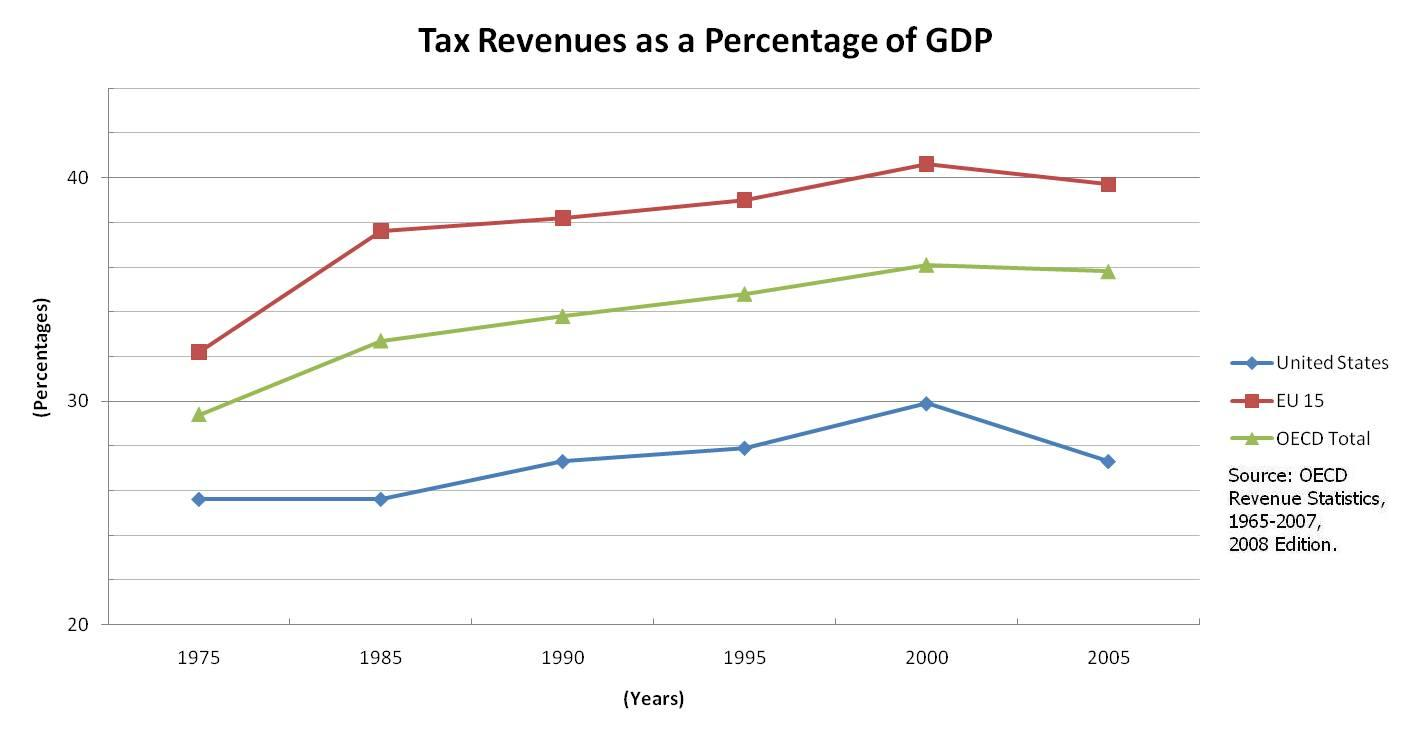
Total government tax revenues as a percentage of GDP for the U.S. in comparison to the OECD and the EU 15

In 2001, President George W. Bush proposed and Congress accepted an eventual lowering of the top marginal rate to 35%. However, this was done in stages: with the highest marginal rate of 39.1% for 2001, then 38.6% for 2002 and finally 35% for years 2003 through 2010. This measure had a sunset provision and was scheduled to expire for the 2011 tax year when rates would have returned to those adopted during the Clinton years unless Congress changed the law; Congress did so bypassing the Tax Relief, Unemployment Insurance Reauthorization and Job Creation Act of 2010, signed by President Barack Obama on December 17, 2010.

At first, the income tax was incrementally expanded by the Congress of the United States, and then inflation automatically raised most persons into tax brackets formerly reserved for the wealthy until income tax brackets were adjusted for inflation. Income tax now applies to almost two-thirds of the population. The lowest-earning workers, especially those with dependents, pay no income taxes as a group and get a small subsidy from the federal government because of child credits and the Earned Income Tax Credit.

While the government was originally funded via tariffs upon imported goods, tariffs now represent only a minor portion of federal revenues. Non-tax fees are generated to recompense agencies for services or to fill specific trust funds such as the fee placed upon airline tickets for airport expansion and air traffic control. Often the receipts intended to be placed in "trust" funds are used for other purposes, with the government posting an IOU ('I owe you) in the form of a federal bond or other accounting instrument, then spending the money on unrelated current expenditures.

Net long-term capital gains as well as certain types of qualified dividend income are taxed preferentially. The federal government collects several specific taxes in addition to the general income tax. Social Security and Medicare are large social support programs which are funded by taxes on personal earned income (see below).

=== Treatment of "income" ===
Tax statutes passed after the ratification of the Sixteenth Amendment in 1913 are sometimes referred to as the "modern" tax statutes. Hundreds of Congressional acts have been passed since 1913, as well as several codifications (i.e., topical reorganizations) of the statutes (see Codification).

The modern interpretation of the Sixteenth Amendment taxation power can be found in Commissioner v. Glenshaw Glass Co. 348 U.S. 426 (1955). In that case, a taxpayer had received an award of punitive damages from a competitor and sought to avoid paying taxes on that award. The U.S. Supreme Court observed that Congress, in imposing the income tax, had defined income to include:

gains, profits, and the income derived from salaries, wages, or compensation for personal service ... of whatever kind and in whatever form paid, or from professions, vocations, trades, businesses, commerce, or sales, or dealings in property, whether real or personal, growing out of the ownership or use of or interest in such property; also from interest, rent, dividends, securities, or the transaction of any business carried on for gain or profit, or gains or profits and the income derived from any source whatever.

The Court held that "this language was used by Congress to exert in this field the full measure of its taxing power", id., and that "the Court has given a liberal construction to this broad phraseology in recognition of the intention of Congress to tax all gains except those specifically exempted."

The Court then enunciated what is now understood by Congress and the Courts to be the definition of taxable income, "instances of undeniable accessions to wealth, clearly realized, and over which the taxpayers have complete dominion." Id. at 431. The defendant, in that case, suggested that a 1954 rewording of the tax code had limited the income that could be taxed, a position which the Court rejected, stating:

The definition of gross income has been simplified, but no effect upon its present broad scope was intended. Certainly, punitive damages cannot reasonably be classified as gifts, nor do they come under any other exemption provision in the Code. We would do violence to the plain meaning of the statute and restrict a clear legislative attempt to bring the taxing power to bear upon all receipts constitutionally taxable were we to say that the payments in question here are not gross income.

In Conner v. The United States, a couple had lost their home to a fire and had received compensation for their loss from the insurance company, partly in the form of hotel costs reimbursed. The U.S. District Court acknowledged the authority of the IRS to assess taxes on all forms of payment but did not permit taxation on the compensation provided by the insurance company, because unlike a wage or a sale of goods at a profit, this was not a gain. As the court noted, "Congress has taxed income, not compensation". By contrast, at least two federal courts of appeals have indicated that Congress may constitutionally tax an item as "income," regardless of whether that item is in fact income. See Penn Mutual Indemnity Co. v. Commissioner and Murphy v. Internal Revenue Serv.

== Estate and gift tax ==
The origins of the estate and gift tax occurred during the rise of the state inheritance tax in the late 19th century and the Progressive Era.

In the 1880s and 1890s, many states passed inheritance taxes, which taxed the donees on the receipt of their inheritance. While many objected to the application of an inheritance tax, some including Andrew Carnegie and John D. Rockefeller supported increases in the taxation of inheritance.

At the beginning of the 20th century, President Theodore Roosevelt advocated the application of a progressive inheritance tax on the federal level.

In 1916, Congress adopted the present federal estate tax, which instead of taxing the wealth that a donee inherited as occurred in the state inheritance taxes it taxed the wealth of a donor's estate upon transfer.

Later, Congress passed the Revenue Act of 1924, which imposed the gift tax, a tax on gifts given by the donor.

In 1948 Congress allowed marital deductions for the estate and the gift tax. In 1981, Congress expanded this deduction to an unlimited amount for gifts between spouses.

Today, the estate tax is a tax imposed on the transfer of the "taxable estate" of a deceased person, whether such property is transferred via a will or according to the state laws of intestacy. The estate tax is one part of the Unified Gift and Estate Tax system in the United States. The other part of the system, the gift tax, imposes a tax on transfers of property during a person's life; the gift tax prevents avoidance of the estate tax should a person want to give away his/her estate just before dying.

In addition to the federal government, many states also impose an estate tax, with the state version called either an estate tax or an inheritance tax. Since the 1990s, the term "death tax" has been widely used by those who want to eliminate the estate tax, because the terminology used in discussing a political issue affects popular opinion.

If an asset is left to a spouse or a charitable organization, the tax usually does not apply. The tax is imposed on other transfers of property made as an incident of the death of the owner, such as a transfer of property from an intestate estate or trust, or the payment of certain life insurance benefits or financial account sums to beneficiaries.

== Payroll tax ==
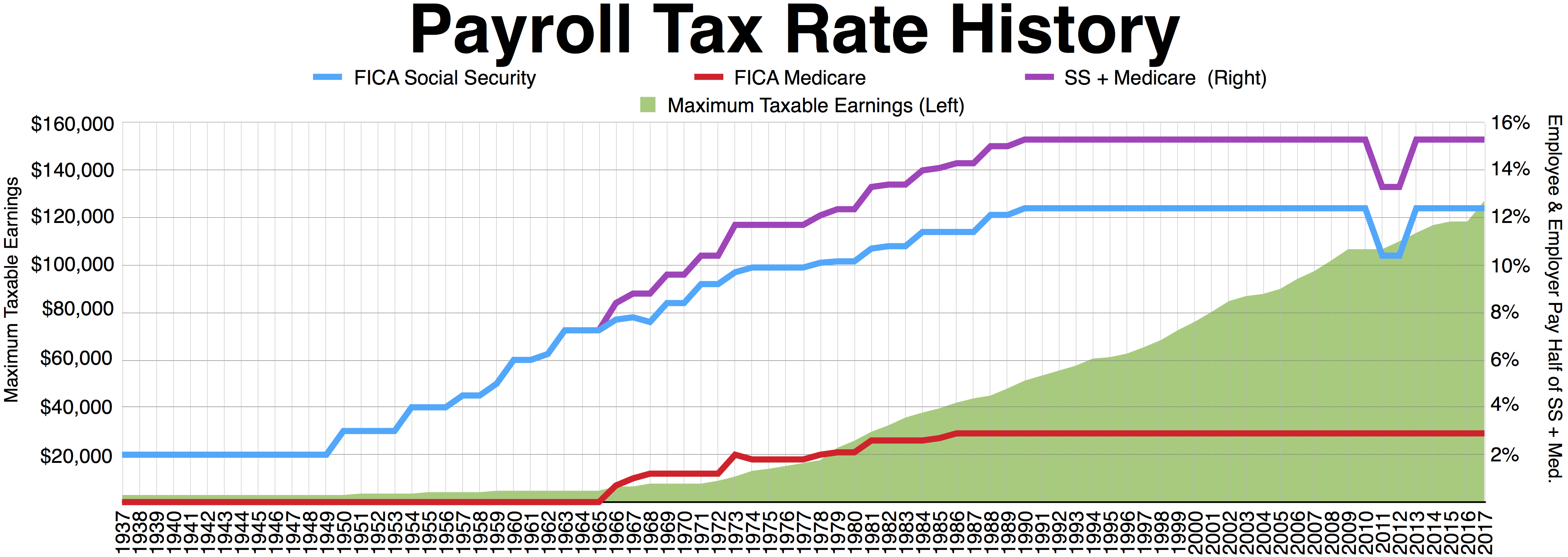
Payroll tax history

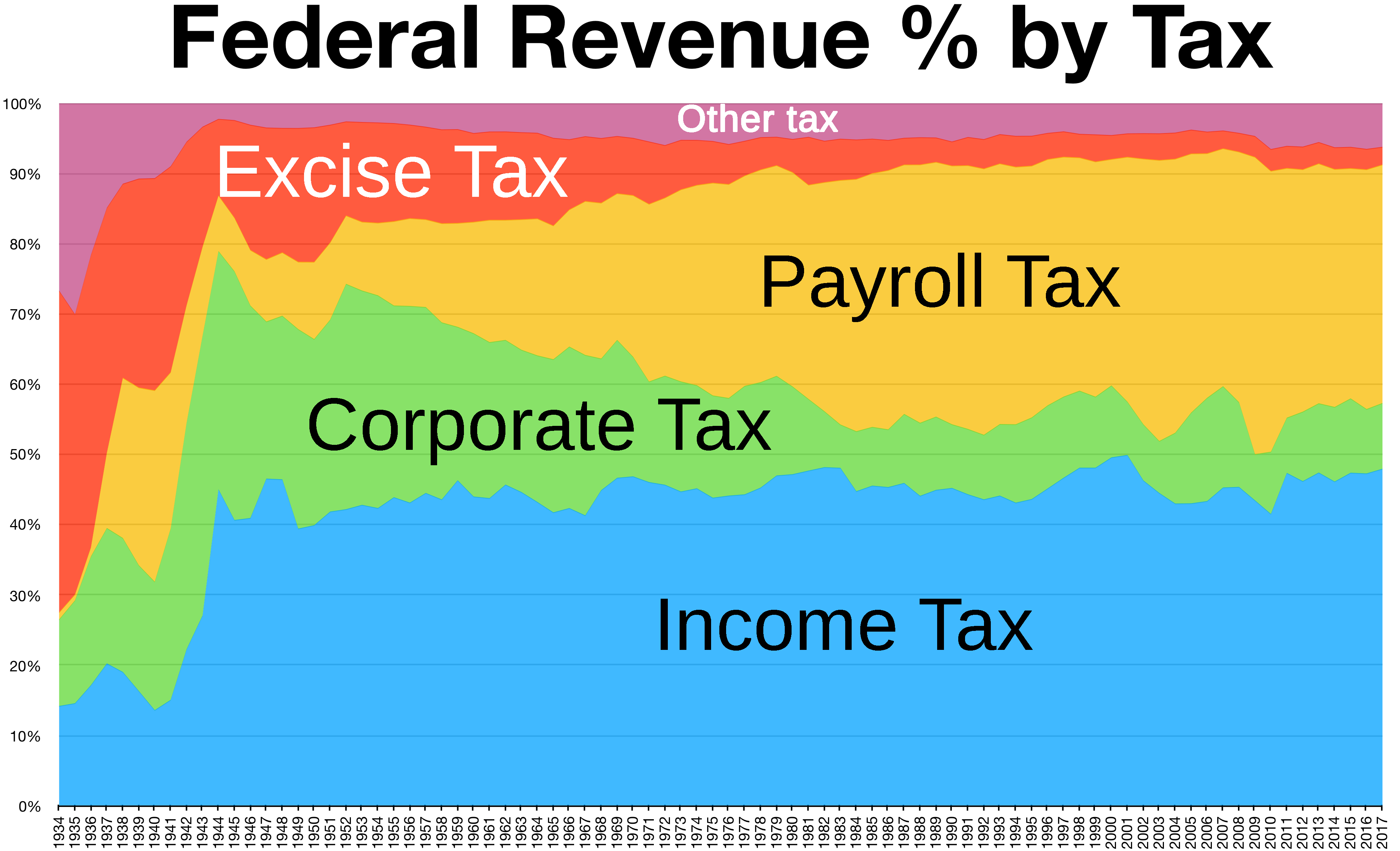
Taxes revenue by source chart history

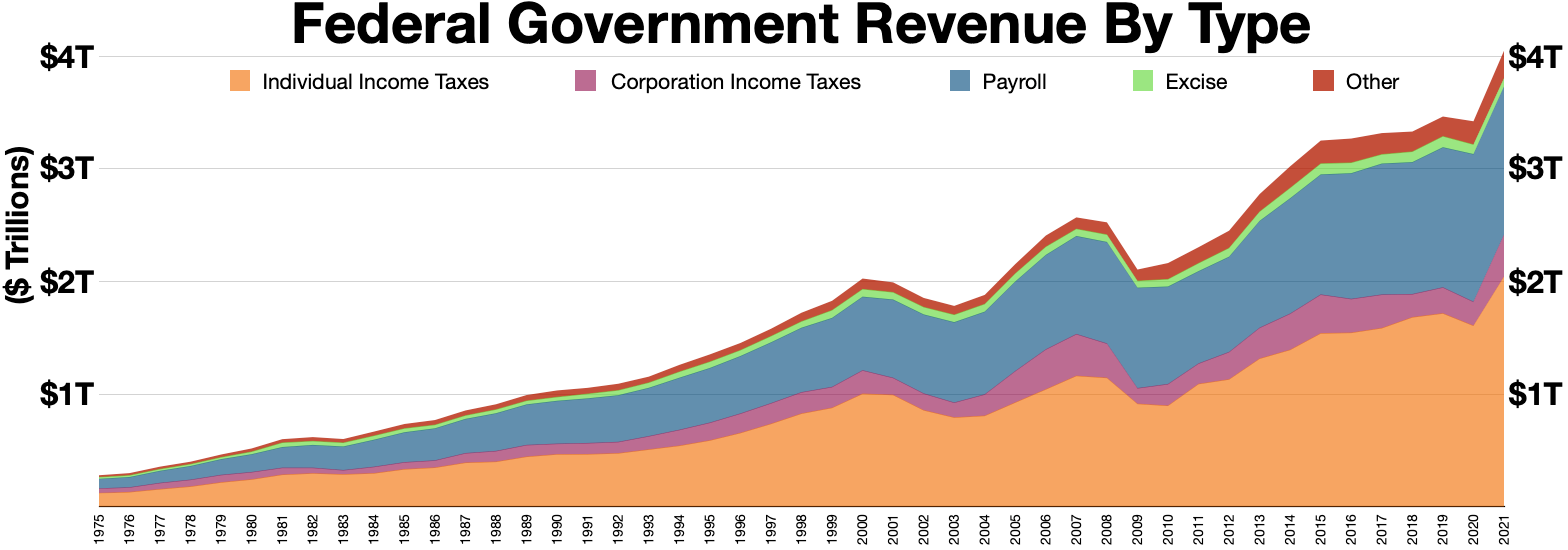
Federal Government revenue by type Other Excise tax Payroll tax Corporate tax Personal Income Tax

Before the Great Depression, the following economic problems were considered great hazards to working-class Americans:

- The U.S. had no federal-government-mandated retirement savings; consequently, for many workers (those who could not afford both to save for retirement and to pay for living expenses), the end of their work careers was the end of all income.
- Similarly, the U.S. had no federal-government-mandated disability income insurance to provide for citizens disabled by injuries (of any kind—work-related or non-work-related); consequently, for most people, a disabling injury meant no more income if they had not saved enough money to prepare for such an event (since most people have little to no income except earned income from work).
- In addition, there was no federal-government-mandated disability income insurance to provide for people unable to ever work during their lives, such as anyone born with severe mental retardation.
- Finally, the U.S. had no federal-government-mandated health insurance for the elderly; consequently, for many workers (those who could not afford both to save for retirement and to pay for living expenses), the end of their work careers was the end of their ability to pay for medical care.

=== Creation ===
In the 1930s, the New Deal introduced Social Security to rectify the first three problems (retirement, injury-induced disability, or congenital disability). It introduced the FICA tax as the means to pay for Social Security.

In the 1960s, Medicare was introduced to rectify the fourth problem (health care for the elderly). The FICA tax was increased to pay for this expense.

=== Development ===
President Franklin D. Roosevelt introduced the Social Security (FICA) Program. FICA began with voluntary participation, participants would have to pay 1% of the first $1,400 of their annual incomes into the Program, the money the participants elected to put into the Program would be deductible from their income for tax purposes each year, the money the participants put into the independent "Trust Fund" rather than into the General operating fund, and therefore, would only be used to fund the Social Security Retirement Program, and no other Government program, and, the annuity payments to the retirees would never be taxed as income.

During the Lyndon B. Johnson administration Social Security moved from the trust fund to the general fund. Participants may not have an income tax deduction for Social Security withholding. Immigrants became eligible for Social Security benefits during the Carter administration. During the Reagan administration Social Security annuities became taxable.

== Alternative minimum tax ==
The alternative minimum tax (AMT) was introduced by the Tax Reform Act of 1969, and became operative in 1970. It was intended to target 155 high-income households that had been eligible for so many tax benefits that they owed little or no income tax under the tax code of the time.

In recent years, the AMT has been under increased attention. With the Tax Reform Act of 1986, the AMT was broadened and refocused on homeowners in high tax states. Because the AMT is not indexed to inflation and recent tax cuts, an increasing number of middle-income taxpayers have been finding themselves subject to this tax.

In 2006, the IRS's National Taxpayer Advocate's report highlighted the AMT as the single most serious problem with the tax code. The advocate noted that the AMT punishes taxpayers for having children or living in a high-tax state and that the complexity of the AMT leads to most taxpayers who owe AMT not realizing it until preparing their returns or being notified by the IRS.

== Capital gains tax ==
Federal Capital Gains Tax Collections 1954-2009 history chart

The origins of the income tax on gains from capital assets did not distinguish capital gains from ordinary income. From 1913 to 1921, income from capital gains was taxed at ordinary rates, initially up to a maximum rate of 7 percent.

Congress began to distinguish the taxation of capital gains from the taxation of ordinary income according to the holding period of the asset with the Revenue Act of 1921, which allowed a tax rate of 12.5 percent gain for assets held at least two years.

In addition to different tax rates depending on the holding period, Congress began excluding certain percentages of capital gains depending on the holding period. From 1934 to 1941, taxpayers could exclude percentages of gains that varied with the holding period: 20, 40, 60, and 70 percent of gains were excluded on assets held 1, 2, 5, and 10 years, respectively. Beginning in 1942, taxpayers could exclude 50 percent of capital gains from income on assets held at least six months or elect a 25 percent alternative tax rate if their ordinary tax rate exceeded 50 percent.

Capital gains tax rates were significantly increased in the 1969 and 1976 Tax Reform Acts.

The 1970s and 1980s saw a period of oscillating capital gains tax rates. In 1978, Congress reduced capital gains tax rates by eliminating the minimum tax on excluded gains and increasing the exclusion to 60 percent, thereby reducing the maximum rate to 28 percent. The 1981 tax rate reductions further reduced capital gains rates to a maximum of 20 percent.

Later in the 1980s, Congress began increasing the capital gains tax rate and repealing the exclusion of capital gains. The Tax Reform Act of 1986 repealed the exclusion from income that provided for tax-exemption of long-term capital gains, raising the maximum rate to 28 percent (33 percent for taxpayers subject to phaseouts). When the top ordinary tax rates were increased by the 1990 and 1993 budget acts, an alternative tax rate of 28 percent was provided. Effective tax rates exceeded 28 percent for many high-income taxpayers, however, because of interactions with other tax provisions.

The end of the 1990s and the beginning of the present century heralded major reductions in taxing the income from gains on capital assets. Lower rates for 18-month and five-year assets were adopted in 1997 with the Taxpayer Relief Act of 1997. In 2001, President George W. Bush signed the Economic Growth and Tax Relief Reconciliation Act of 2001, into law as part of a $1.35 trillion tax cut program.

== Corporate tax ==
The United States' corporate tax rate was at its highest, 52.8 percent, in 1968 and 1969. The top rate was hiked last in 1993 to 35 percent. Under the Tax Cuts and Jobs Act of 2017, the rate adjusted to 21 percent.

== See also ==
- Income tax in the United States
- Starve the beast (policy)
- Taxation in the United States
- Tax resistance in the United States
- List of United States Supreme Court taxation and revenue case law
- History of taxation in the United Kingdom
