= Tariff of 1792 =

Historical United States tariff

2nd United States Congress
- Long title: An Act supplementary to the act making provision for the Debt of the United States.
- Citation: Pub. L. 2–38; 1 Stat. 281, Chap. 38
- Enacted by: 2nd United States Congress
- Enacted: May 8, 1792
- Signed by: George Washington

Summary
- U.S. Congressional bill was the fourth public debt resolution. Act provided to extend the term allowed for receiving, on loans, that part of the domestic debt remaining unsubscribed with certain exceptions.

The Tariff of 1792 was the third of Alexander Hamilton's protective tariffs in the United States (first was the Hamilton tariff of 1789, second was the Tariff of 1790). Hamilton had persuaded the United States Congress to raise duties slightly in 1790, and he persuaded them to raise rates again in 1792, although still not to his satisfaction. Protectionism was one of the fulfillments of Hamilton's Report on Manufactures.

== See also ==
Debtors' Prison Relief Act of 1792	Panic of 1792
Early American currency	Protectionism in the United States
Excise tax in the United States	Tariff in United States history
Financial costs of the American Revolutionary War	Taxation in the United States
On American Taxation	Wealth tax
