= Tariff of 1790 =

Historical United States tariff

- Long title: An Act making further provision for the payment of the debts of the United States
- Enacted by: the 1st United States Congress
- Effective: December 31, 1790

Citations
- Statutes at Large: 1 Stat. 180

Legislative history
- Introduced in the House by James Madison; Signed into law by President George Washington on August 10, 1790

In 1789, Alexander Hamilton, the Secretary of the Treasury, calculated that the United States required $3 million a year for operating expenses as well as enough revenue to repay the estimated $75 million in foreign and domestic debt. Under the rates established by the Tariff of 1789, the government could not meet its obligations. Consequently, Hamilton proposed an increase in the average rate from 5 percent to between 7 and 10 percent, the addition of numerous items to the list, and the passage of an excise tax. Congress refused to pass the excise tax, but James Madison successfully steered the tariff increases through the legislature.

The Act Laying Duties on Imports was communicated by Alexander Hamilton to the United States House of Representatives on April 23, 1790. In order to promote manufacturing in the United States, Hamilton proposed that imported goods be more expensive, which would force Americans to buy more homemade products.

== Text of the Act ==
"An Act making further provisions for the payment of the debts of the United States."

Whereas, by an act, intitled "An act for laying a duty on goods, wares and merchandises imported into the United States, " diverse duties were laid on goods, wares and merchandise so imported, for the discharge of the debts of the United States, and the encouragement and protection of manufactures: And whereas the support of government and the discharge of said debts, render it necessary to increase the duties;

SEC. 1. Be it enacted by the Senate and House of Representatives of the United States of America in Congress assembled, That from and after the last day of December next, the duties specified and laid in and by the act aforesaid, shall cease and determine; and that upon all goods, wares, and merchandise (not herein particularly excepted) which after the said day shall be brought into the United States, from any foreign port or place, there shall be levied, collected and paid the several and respective duties following, that is to say: Madeira wine of the quality of London particular, per gallon, thirty-five cents; other Madeira wine, per gallon, thirty cents; Sherry wine, per gallon, twenty-five cents; other wines, per gallon, twenty cents; distilled spirits, if more than ten per cent below proof, according to Dycas's hydrometer, per gallon, twelve cents; if more than five, and not more than ten per cent below proof, according to the same hydrometer, per gallon, twelve and a half cents; if of proof, and not more than five per cent below proof, according to the same hydrometer, per gallon, thirteen cents; if above proof, but not exceeding twenty per cent, according to the same hydrometer, per gallon, twenty cents; if more than forty per cent above proof, according to the same hydrometer, per gallon, twenty-five cents; molasses, per gallon, three cents; beer, ale and porter in casks, per gallon, five cents; beer, ale and porter in bottles, per dozen, twenty cents. Teas from China and India, in ships or vessels of the United States, bohea, per pound, ten cents; souchong and other black teas, per pound eighteen cents, hyson, per pound, thirty-two cents; other green teas, per pound, twenty cents. Teas from Europe, in ships or vessels of the United States, bohea, per pound, twelve cents; souchong and other black teas, per pound, twenty-one cents; hyson, per pound, forty cents; other green teas, per pound, twenty-four cents. Teas from any other place, or in any other ships or vessel, bohea, per pound, fifteen cents; souchong and other black teas, per pound, twenty-seven cents; hyson, per pound, fifty cents; other green teas, per pound, thirty cents; coffee, per pound, four cents; cocoa, per pound, one cent; loaf sugar, per pound, five cents; brown sugar, per pound, one and a half cent; other sugar, per pound, two and a half cents; candles of tallow, per pound, two cents; candles of wax or spermaceti, per pound, six cents; cheese, per pound, four cents; soap, per pound, two cents; pepper per pound, six cents; pimento, per pound, four cents; manufactured tobacco, per pound, six cents; snuff, per pound, ten cents; indigo, per pound, twenty-five cents; cotton, per pound, three cents; nails and spikes, per pound, one cent; bar and other lead, per pound, one cent; steel unwrought, per one hundred and twelve pounds, seventy-five cents; hemp, per one hundred and twelve pounds, fifty-four cents; cables, per one hundred and twelve pounds, one hundred cents; untarred cordage and yarn, per one hundred and twelve pounds, one hundred and fifty cents; twine and pack thread, per one hundred and twelve pounds, three hundred cents; salt, per bushel, twelve cents; malt, per bushel, ten cents; coal, per bushel, three cents; boots, per pair, fifty cents; shoes, slippers and goloshoes, made of leather, per pair, seven cents; shoes and slippers, made of silk or stuff, per pair, ten cents; wool and cotton cards, per dozen, fifty cents; playing cards, per pack, ten cents; all China ware, looking glasses, window and other glass, and all manufactures of glass (black quart bottles excepted) twelve and a half per centum ad valorem; marble, slate, and other stones, bricks, tiles, tables, mortars and other utensils of marble or slate, and generally all stone and earthen ware, blank books, writing paper, and wrapping paper, paper hangings, pasteboards, parchment and vellum, pictures and prints, painter's colors, including lampblack, except those commonly used in dyeing, gold, silver, and plated ware, gold and silver lace, jewellery and paste work, clocks and watches, shoe and knee buckles, grocery, (except the articles before enumerated) namely, cinnamon, cloves, mace, nutmegs, ginger, aniseed, currants, dates, figs, plums, prunes, raisins, sugar candy, oranges, lemons, limes, and generally all fruits and comfits, olives, capers, and pickles of every sort, oil, gunpowder, mustard in flour, ten per centum ad valorem; cabinet wares, buttons, saddles, gloves of leather, hats of beaver, felt, wool, or a mixture of any of them, military ready made, castings of iron, and slit and rolled iron, leather tanned or tawed, and all manufactures of which leather is the chief value, except such as herein otherwise rated, canes, walking sticks and whips, clothing ready made, brushes, anchors, all wares of tin, pewter, or copper, all or any of them, medicinal drugs, except those commonly used in dyeing, carpets and carpeting, all velvets, velverets, satins, and other wrought silks, cumbrics, muslins, muslincts, lawns, laces, gauzes, chintzes, and colored calicoes, and nankeens, seven and a half per centum ad valorem. All goods, wares and merchandise imported directly from China or India in ships or vessels not of the United States, teas excepted, twelve and a half per centum ad valorem. All coaches, chariots, phaetons, chaises, chairs, solos or other carriages, or parts of carriages, fifteen and a half per centum ad valorem; and five per centum ad valorem upon all other goods, wares, and merchandise, except bullion, tin in pigs, tin plates, old pewter, brass teutenague, iron and brass wire, copper in plates, saltpetre, plaster of Paris, wool, dyeing woods, and dyeing drugs, raw hides and skins, undressed furs of every kind, the sea stores of ships and vessels, the clothes, books, household furniture, and the tools or implements of the trade or profession of persons who come to reside in the United States, philosophical apparatus, specially imported for any seminary of learning, all goods intended to be re-exported to a foreign port or place, in the same ship or vessel in which they shall be imported, and generally, all articles of the growth, product or manufactures of the United States.

SEC. 2. And be it furthered enacted, That an addition of ten per centum shall be made to the several rates of duties specified and imposed, in respect to all goods, wares and merchandise, which, after the said last day of December next, shall be imported in ships or vessels not of the United States, except in the cases in which an additional duty is herein before specially laid on any goods, wares, or merchandises, which shall be imported in such ships or vessels.

SEC. 3. And be it further enacted, that all duties which shall be paid or secured to be paid by virtue of this act, shall be returned or discharged in respect to all such goods, wares or merchandise, whereupon they shall have been so paid, or secured to be paid as within twelve calendar months after payment made or security given, shall be exported to any foreign port or place, except one per centum on the amount of the said duties, which shall be retained as an indemnification for whatever expense may have accrued concerning the same.

SEC. 4. And be it further enacted, That there shall be allowed and paid on dried and pickled fish, of the fisheries of the United States, and on other provisions salted within the said states which, after the said last day of December next, shall be exported therefrom to any foreign port or place, in lieu of a drawback of the duty on the salt which shall have been expended thereupon, according to the following rates—namely: Dried fish, per quintal, ten cents; pickled fish and other salted provisions, per barrel, ten cents.

SEC. 5. And be it further enacted, That where duties by this act are imposed, or drawbacks allowed on any specific quantity of goods, wares, and merchandise, the same shall be deemed to apply in proportion to any quantity, more or less, than such specific quantity.

SEC. 6. And be it further enacted, That all the duties which, by virtue of the act, intitled "An act for laying a duty on goods, wares and merchandises imported into the United States, " accrued between the time specified in the said act for the commencement of the said duties, and the respective times when the collectors entered upon the duties of their respective offices in the several districts, be, and they are hereby remitted and discharged, and that in any case in which they may have been paid to the United States, restitution thereof shall be made.

SEC. 7. And be it further enacted, That the several duties imposed by this act shall continue to be collected and paid, until the debts and purposes for which they are pledged and appropriated, shall be fully discharged: Provided, That nothing herein contained shall be construed to prevent the legislation of the United States from substituting other duties or taxes of equal value to any or all of the said duties and imposts.

Approved, August 10, 1790
