= Tariff of 1789 =

First Act of United States Congress

- Long title: An Act for imposing duties on goods, wares, and merchandises imported into the United States
- Nicknames: Tariff Act of 1789
- Enacted by: the 1st United States Congress
- Effective: July 4, 1789

Citations
- Statutes at Large: 1 Stat. 29

Codification
- Titles amended: 19 U.S.C.: Customs Duties

Legislative history
- Introduced in the House of Representatives; Committee consideration by House Ways and Means; Passed the House of Representatives on July 1789; Passed the Senate on July 1789; Signed into law by President George Washington on July 4, 1789

The Tariff Act of 1789 was the first major piece of legislation passed in the United States after the ratification of the United States Constitution. It had three purposes: to support government, to protect manufacturing industries developing in the nation, and to raise revenue for the federal debt. It was sponsored by Congressman James Madison, passed by the 1st United States Congress, and signed into law by President George Washington. The act levied a 50¢ per ton duty on goods imported by foreign ships, a 30¢ per ton duty on American made ships owned by foreign entities, and a 6¢ per ton duty on American-owned vessels.

In the aftermath of the American Revolution, the weak Congress of the Confederation had been unable to impose a tariff or reach reciprocal trade agreements with most European powers, creating a situation in which the country was unable to prevent a flood of European goods which were damaging domestic manufacturers even while Britain and other countries placed high duties on U.S. goods. The country also faced major debts left over from the Revolutionary War, and needed new sources of funding to maintain financial solvency. One of the major powers granted under the new Constitution was the ability to levy tariffs, and after the 1st Congress was seated, passage of a tariff bill became one of the most pressing issues.

The debates over the purpose of the tariff exposed the sectional interests at stake: Northern manufacturers favored high duties to protect industry; Southern planters desired a low tariff that would foster cheap consumer imports. Ultimately, Madison navigated the tariff to passage, but he was unable to include a provision in the final bill that would have discriminated against British imports. After passing both houses of Congress, President Washington signed the act in law on July 6, 1789 when they used it to pay off the US war debt.

== Economic conditions prior to passage ==
The American Revolution was followed by an economic reorganization, which carried in its wake a period of uncertainty and hard times. During the conflict, labor and investment had been diverted from agriculture and legitimate trade to manufacturing and privateers. Men had gone into occupations that ceased with the end of the war. Lowered prices, resulting from the cessation of war demands, in combination with the importation of the cheaper goods of Europe, were fast ruining such infant manufacturing concerns as had sprung up during the war, some of which were at a comparative disadvantage with the resumption of normal foreign trading relations.

Another factor which made the situation even more distressing was the British Navigation Acts. The only clause in the 1783 Paris peace treaty concerning commerce was a stipulation guaranteeing that the navigation of the Mississippi would be forever free to the United States. John Jay had tried to secure some reciprocal trade provisions with Great Britain but without result. William Pitt, in 1783, introduced a bill into the British Parliament providing for free trade between the United States and the British colonies, but instead of passing the bill, Parliament enacted the British Navigation Act 1783, which admitted only British built and manned ships to the ports of the West Indies, and imposed heavy tonnage dues upon American ships in other British ports. It was amplified in 1786 by another act designed to prevent the fraudulent registration of American vessels and by still another in 1787, which prohibited the importation of American goods by way of foreign islands. The favorable features of the old Navigation Acts that had granted bounties and reserved the English markets in certain cases to colonial products were gone; the unfavorable ones were left. The British market was further curtailed by the depression there after 1783. Although the French treaty of 1778 had promised "perfect equality and reciprocity" in commercial relations, it was found impossible to make a commercial treaty on that basis. Spain demanded, as the price for reciprocal trading relations, a surrender by the United States for 25 years the right of navigating the Mississippi, a price that the New England merchants would have been glad to pay.

France (1778) and the Netherlands (1782) made treaties but not on even terms; Portugal refused all advances. Only Sweden (1783) and Prussia (1785) made treaties guaranteeing reciprocal commercial privileges.

The weakness of the Continental Congress under the Articles of Confederation prevented retaliation by the central government. Congress repeatedly asked for power to regulate commerce, but was refused by the states upon which rested the execution of such commercial treaties as Congress might negotiate. Eventually, the states themselves attempted retaliatory measures, and from 1783 to 1788, New Hampshire, Massachusetts, Rhode Island, New York, Pennsylvania, Maryland, Virginia, North Carolina, South Carolina, and Georgia levied tonnage dues upon British vessels or discriminating tariffs upon British goods. Whatever effect these efforts might have had were neutralized by the fact that the duties varied 0% to 100%, which simply drove British ships to the free or cheapest ports to flood the market with their goods. Commercial war between the states followed and turned futility into chaos.

Adoption of the Constitution meant the elimination of many of the economic ills under which industry and commerce had struggled since the war. A reorganization was essential and the immediate economic results were salutary. Its most important additions to the power of Congress were those relating to finance and commerce: it enabled the federal government to levy taxes, regulate trade, coin money, protect industry, and direct the settlement of the West, and, as later events proved, to establish credit and redeem its securities. Under it, freedom of trade was ensured throughout the young republic.

In the months leading up to the passage of the Tariff Act, Congress received several petitions from different cities representing manufacturing groups asking for relief from the flood of European imported goods.

The United States Congress answered the petitions of these groups for urgent attention, by making the Tariff of 1789 the first major bill to be considered in its first session and passed.

== Import duty legislation and American sectional interests ==
The import fees "represented a compromise between the advocates of a high protective tariff and those who favored a tariff for revenue only [to maintain the central government]." Charges up to fifty percent were imposed on selected manufactured and agricultural goods, including "steel, ships, cordage, tobacco, salt, indigo [and] cloth." On the majority of items subject to duty, a five percent fee was levied, ad valorem. Molasses, an indispensable ingredient for Northeastern rum producers, was lowered from 6¢ per gallon to 2.5¢.

James Madison modified the terms of the tariff to balance sectional conflicts but conceded that articles subject to high duties "were pretty generally taxed for the benefit of the manufacturing part of the northern community." He acknowledged the South, the main wealth-producing part of the nation, would inevitably "shoulder a disproportionate share of the financial burden involved in the transforming the United States into a commercial, manufacturing, and maritime power."

== Tonnage duty legislation and US foreign relations with European powers ==
In its final form, the tariff erected "an American navigation system," superseding the individual state sanctioned fees designed to protect domestic shipping during the Articles of Confederation period from 1781 to 1789.

The act established tonnage rates favorable to American carriers by charging them lower cargo fees than those imposed on foreign boats importing similar goods. Coastal trade was reserved exclusively for American flag vessels. These provisions were consistent with mercantilist policies practice by European powers at the time.

Dating from the Treaty of Paris, ending the War for Independence in 1783, Great Britain had declined to seek a commercial treaty with the United States. In addition, provisions of the treaty had gone unfulfilled, including compensation to slaveholders for slaves emancipated by the British Navy during the War and the failure to abandon military posts in the Northwest Territory. Still, Great Britain remained the dominant trading partner for the United States, the countries reverting to an essentially colonial-era trade relationship.

Representative James Madison, presiding over the tariff debates in Congress, attempted to introduce discriminatory provisions into the tonnage legislation that would favor France and its colonial possessions and shift American trade away from Great Britain.

To effect this, Madison called for a 60¢ per ton fee upon foreign carriers lacking a commercial agreement with the United States, while France, which possessed a treaty, would be charged tonnage at 30¢. This measure alone "was equivalent to levying economic war" upon Great Britain.

Madison's proposals were intended to unify politically the agricultural and manufacturing interests in support of that commercial realignment at the national level, damaging to Great Britain and beneficial to revolutionary France.

Many representatives of northern business were wary of abandoning Great Britain as their primary trading partner and merchant marine and questioned whether France could ever act "as the principle supplier and market for the United States."

The House of Representatives, nevertheless, initially passed Madison's "controversial" legislation, with the discriminatory provision intact. The Senate, however, removed it from the bill and sent it back to the House, where it was passed, without amendment, 31 to 19, on July 4, 1789. President Washington signed the act into law on July 4, 1789. The final bill extracted concessions from both interests, but delivered a distinct advantage to maritime and manufacturing regions of the country.

The Tariff of 1789 placed France and Great Britain on an equal footing with regard to shipping, manufactures, and raw products delivered to American ports. All foreign-owned or foreign-built ships paid 50¢ per ton duty; American-owned vessels were charged 6¢ per ton.

To enable the federal government to collect the import duties, Congress also passed the Collection Act of 1789, which established the United States Customs Service and designated ports of entry. The tariffs established by this and later acts would make up the vast majority of government revenue; more than 87 percent of the federal government's revenue between 1789 and 1800 came from import duties. The tariff would continue to make up the bulk of federal revenue until the 20th century.

== Political and sectional responses to the tariff ==
Madison's attempt to enlist northern merchants and businessmen in supporting an economic contest with Great Britain elicited a cool response. Firstly, British capital and markets contributed to the general prosperity of the North, and secondly, a shift towards France would mean aligning the United States with a revolutionary government that exhibited what Federalist leadership regarded as "an excess of democracy." Alexander Hamilton, soon to enter the executive branch as Secretary of the Treasury, declined to support Madison's proposal and warned that economic warfare with Great Britain would drastically reduce the import duty revenue that the tariff legislation called for, placing at risk the funds anticipated to run the new federal government and finance the national debt.

This dispute between Madison and Hamilton marked "the first important breach" between these two Federalist leaders, which would deepen when Hamilton, as Treasury Secretary, launched his fiscal and economic programs, ending their long collaboration. The legislation produced the first sectional strains within "the Federalist coalition of northern businessmen and southern planters." In the South, "agricultural interests" viewed the high tariff and tonnage rates as a triumph for northern merchants and manufacturers, the burden of which fell on southern staple crop exporters.

This early application of constitutional authority highlighted north-south social and economic differences and presaged the dissolution of the Federalist coalition, the formation of an agrarian alliance, and the rise of the First Party System. This north-south divide on the basis of disagreements surrounding tariffing would go on to characterize many of the economic arguments, outside of those surrounding slavery, that would lead to the Nullification Crisis, and eventually, the Civil War.

Among Antifederalist reactions there was worry that these tariffs had allowed the Federal Government to encroach too heavily on their perceptions of economic power-sharing between both state and federal levels. In regard to this, the repeated increases to the tariffs throughout the subsequent two decades to the passage of the act had served as repeated infractions to the classic anti-federalist mindset of tempering central authority in such matters.

The subsequent raisings of the tariffs that had been established in 1789, however, would continue to persist into President Jefferson's presidency, despite the fact he was more traditionally aligned with Antifederalist sentiments. This would eventually set the precedent for tariffing to be more commonplace among both Federalist and Antifederalist platforms, and eventually Republican, Whig and Democrat platforms as the nation delved into different party systems.
