= Protectionism in the United States =

Protectionism in the United States is protectionist economic policy that erects tariffs and other barriers on imported goods. This policy was most prevalent in the 19th century. At that time, it was mainly used to protect Northern industries and was opposed by Southern states that wanted free trade to expand cotton and other agricultural exports. Protectionist measures included tariffs and quotas on imported goods, along with subsidies and other means, to restrain the free movement of imported goods, thus encouraging local industry.

There was a general lessening of protectionist measures from the 1930s onwards, culminating in the free trade period that followed the Second World War. After the war, the United States promoted the General Agreement on Tariffs and Trade (GATT), to liberalize trade among all capitalist countries. In 1995, GATT became the World Trade Organization (WTO), and with the collapse of Communism its open markets/low tariff ideology became dominant worldwide. Protectionism has increased in popularity since the election of Donald Trump in 2016.

== History ==
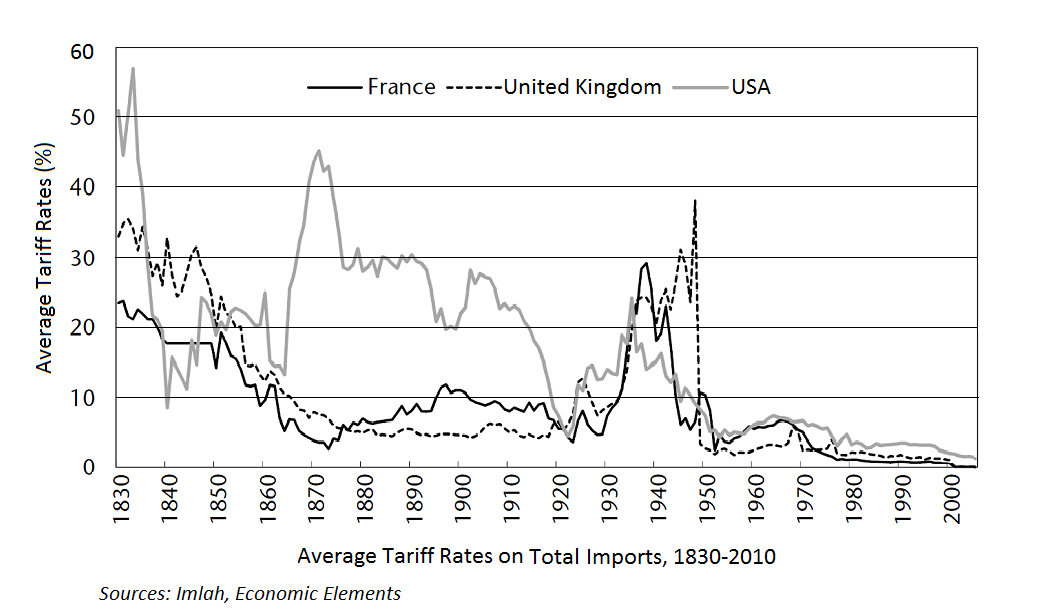
The average tariff rates in France, UK, US, 1830 to 2000

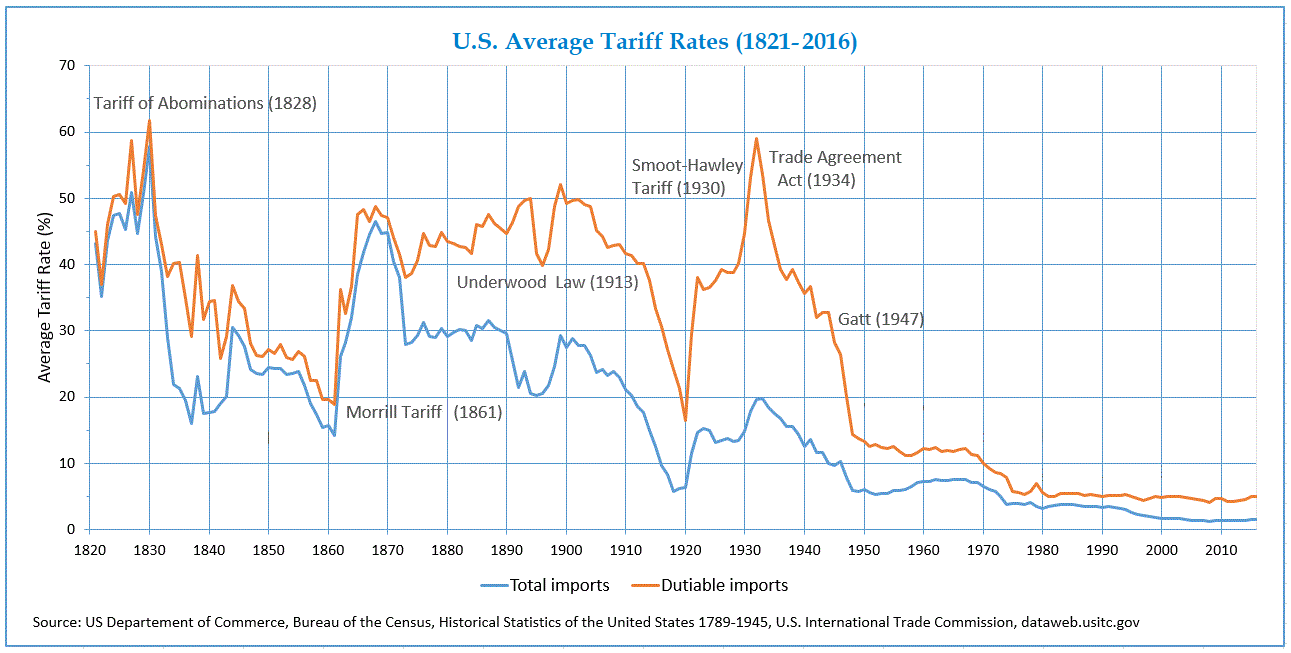
Average US tariff rates, 1821–2016

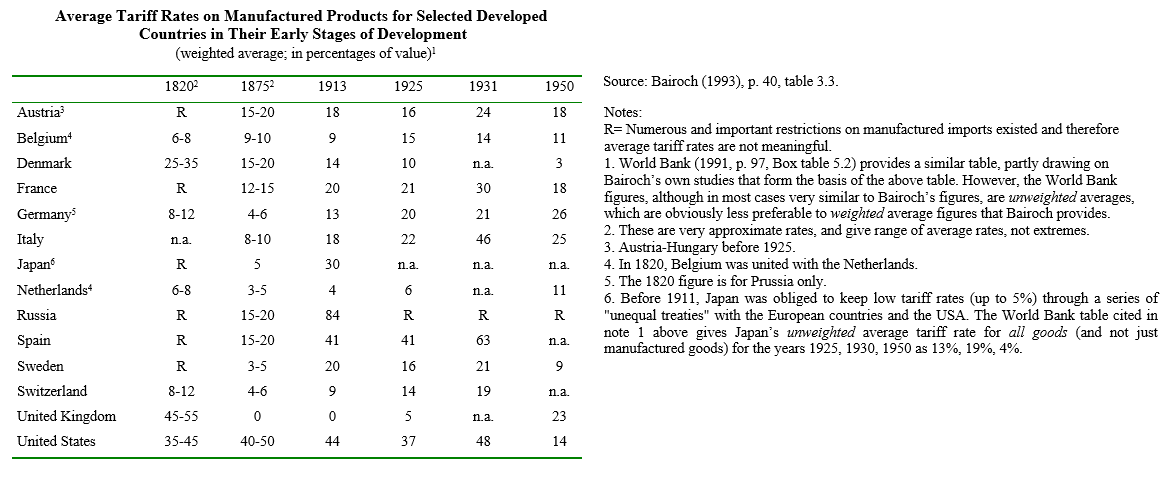
The average tariff rates on manufactured products

Britain was the first country to successfully use a large-scale infant industry promotion strategy. However, its most ardent user was the U.S. Economic historian Paul Bairoch once called it "the homeland and bastion of modern protectionism" (Economics and World History: Myths and Paradoxes, Bairoch).

Britain initially did not want to industrialize the American colonies, and implemented policies to that effect. For example, banning high value-added manufacturing activities. Thus, the American Revolution was, to some extent, a war against this policy, in which the commercial elite of the colonies rebelled against being forced to play a lesser role in the emerging Atlantic economy. Despite the common man's antipathy to this protectionism, after independence Alexander Hamilton and other nationalists passed the Tariff Act of 1789 - the second bill of the Republic signed by President Washington which allowed Congress fund the new government by imposing a fixed tariff of 5% on all imports, with a few exceptions.

Most American intellectuals and politicians during the country's catching-up period felt that the free trade theory advocated by British classical economists was not suited to their country. The US went against the advice of economists like Adam Smith, Ricardo and Jean Baptiste Say and tried to protect its industries. Alexander Hamilton, the first Secretary of the Treasury of the United States (1789–1795) and economist Daniel Raymond were the first theorists to present the argument of the emerging industry, not the German economist Friedrich List. List started out as a free trade advocate and only converted to the infant industry argument following his exile in the U.S (1825–1830).

Hamilton feared that Britain's policy towards the colonies would condemn the United States to be only producers of agricultural products and raw materials. Washington and Hamilton believed that political independence was predicated upon economic independence. Increasing the domestic supply of manufactured goods, particularly war materials, was seen as an issue of national security. In his Reports, Hamilton argued that the competition from abroad and the "forces of habit" would mean that new industries that could soon become internationally competitive ("infant industries") would not be started in the United States, unless the initial losses were guaranteed by government aid.

According to him, this aid could take the form of import duties or, in rare cases, prohibition of imports. He called for customs barriers to allow American industrial development and to help protect infant industries, including bounties (subsidies) derived in part from those tariffs. He also believed that duties on raw materials should be generally low. Hamilton explained that despite an initial "increase of price" caused by regulations that control foreign competition, once a "domestic manufacture has attained to perfection ... it invariably becomes cheaper".

In 1789, Congress passed a tariff act, imposing a 5% flat rate tariff on all imports. Between 1792 and the war with Britain in 1812, the average tariff level remained around 12.5%. In 1812, all tariffs were doubled to an average of 25%, in order to cope with the increase in public expenditure due to the war.

In 1816, a new law was introduced to keep the tariff level close to the wartime level—especially protected were cotton, woolen, and iron goods. The American industrial interests that had blossomed because of the tariff lobbied to keep it, and had it raised to 35 percent in 1816. The public approved, and by 1820, America's average tariff was up to 40 percent.

According to Michael Lind, protectionism was America's de facto policy from the passage of the Tariff of 1816 to World War II, "switching to free trade only in 1945".

There was a brief episode of free trade from 1846, coinciding with the zenith of classical liberalism in Europe, during which American tariffs were lowered.

In the 19th century, statesmen such as Senator Henry Clay continued Hamilton's themes within the Whig Party under the name the "American System".

The American Civil War (1861–1865) was fought over the issue of slavery as well as tariff disputes. At the time of independence, the agrarian interests of the South were opposed to any protection, while the manufacturing interests of the North wanted to maintain it. The fledgling Republican Party led by Abraham Lincoln, who called himself a "Henry Clay tariff Whig", strongly opposed free trade, and implemented a 44-percent tariff during the Civil War—in part to pay for railroad subsidies and for the war effort, and to protect favored industries.

After the First World War, the GOP was baffled when the restoration of higher tariff rates with the Fordney–McCumber Tariff in 1922 did not prevent an economic crash. The second attempt to raise tariffs with the Smoot-Hawley Tariff Act of 1930 also backfired. A stark reduction in international trade and retaliatory actions from Canada, Britain, Germany and other industrial nations exacerbated the devastating effects of the Great Depression on the American population. During the Second World War, the interest in tariffs waned, recent American economic policies were supportive of free trade, while never reaching the heights of British freedom of trade in the mid-nineteenth century.

== Southern states ==
Historically, slave-holding states had little perceived need for mechanization because of the low cost of manual slave labor. They supplied raw cotton to Britain, which supported free trade.

== Northern states ==
Northern states sought to develop manufacturing industries and sought protections to allow nascent Northern manufacturers to compete with their more sophisticated British competitors. Throughout the 19th century, leading US politicians, including Senator Henry Clay, supported Hamilton's approach within the Whig Party under the name "American System."

The opposed Southern Democratic Party contested elections throughout the 1830s, 1840s and 1850s in part over the issue of protection of industry. However, Southern Democrats were never as strong in the U.S. House of Representatives as the more populous North. The Northern Whigs achieved higher protective tariffs over the South's bitter resistance. One Southern state precipitated what came to be called the Nullification Crisis, over the issue of tariffs, arguing that states had the right to ignore federal laws.

Mostly over the issue of abolition and other scandals, the Whigs collapsed, leaving a void which the fledgling Republican Party, led by Abraham Lincoln filled. Lincoln, who called himself a "Henry Clay tariff Whig", strongly opposed free trade. He implemented a 44% tariff during the American Civil War in part to pay for the building of the Union Pacific Railroad, the war effort and to protect American industry.

By President Lincoln's term, the northern manufacturing states had ten times the GDP of the South. With this advantage, the North was able to starve the South of weapons through a near total blockade, while supplying its own army with everything from heavy artillery to Henry repeating rifles.

With the Northern victory, Republican dominance was assured. Republicans continued to dominate American politics until the early 20th century.

President Ulysses S. Grant stated:

For centuries England has relied on protection, has carried it to extremes and has obtained satisfactory results from it. There is no doubt that it is to this system that it owes its present strength. After two centuries, England has found it convenient to adopt free trade because it thinks that protection can no longer offer it anything. Very well then, Gentlemen, my knowledge of our country leads me to believe that within 200 years, when America has gotten out of protection all that it can offer, it too will adopt free trade.

Southern Democrats gradually rebuilt their party and allied themselves with Northern Progressives. They had many differences, but both opposed the corporate trusts that had emerged. This marriage of convenience to face a common enemy reinvigorated the Democratic Party, catapulting them to power.

== Colonial Era to 1789 ==
In the colonial era, before 1775, nearly every colony levied its own tariffs, usually with lower rates for British products. There were taxes on ships (on a tonnage basis), import taxes on slaves, export taxes on tobacco, and import taxes on alcoholic beverages. The London government insisted on a policy of mercantilism whereby only British ships could trade in the colonies. In defiance, some American merchants engaged in smuggling.

During the Revolution, the British blockade from 1775 to 1783 largely ended foreign trade. In the 1783–89 Confederation Period, each state set up its own trade rules, often imposing tariffs or restrictions on neighboring states. The new Constitution, which went into effect in 1789, banned interstate tariffs or trade restrictions, as well as state taxes on exports.

=== Tariffs and the constitution ===
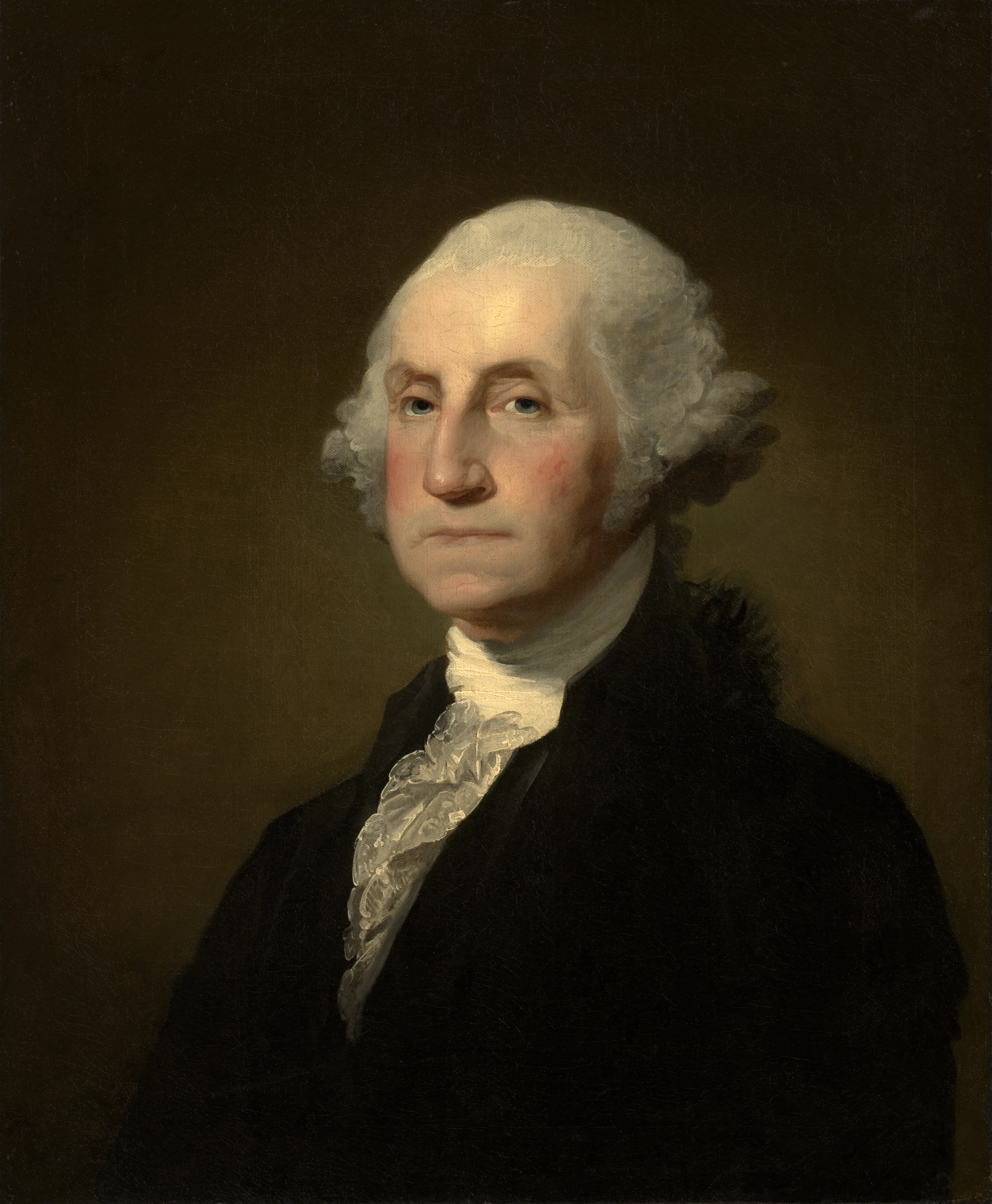
George Washington signed the Tariff of 1789, the first major piece of legislation signed in the United States.

The framers of the United States Constitution gave Congress the power to "lay and collect taxes, duties, imposts and excises, pay the debts and provide for the common defense and general welfare of the United States" and also "to regulate Commerce with foreign Nations, and among the several States, and with the Indian Tribes."

There was a consensus among the Founding Fathers that tariffs were the most efficient way of raising revenue as well as the most politically acceptable. President George Washington signed the Tariff of 1789, which authorized the collection of duties on imported goods. It was sponsored by Congressman James Madison, passed by the 1st United States Congress, and signed into law by Washington. The Tariff Act of 1789 was the first major piece of legislation passed in the United States after the ratification of the United States Constitution. It had three purposes: to support the government, to protect manufacturing industries developing in the nation, and to raise revenue for the federal debt.

At the time the Constitution was adopted, the weak Congress of the Confederation had been unable to impose a tariff or reach reciprocal trade agreements with most European powers, creating a situation in which the country was unable to prevent a flood of European goods which were damaging domestic manufacturers even while the United Kingdom and other countries placed high duties on U.S. goods. For example, France (1778) and the Netherlands (1782) made treaties but not on even terms, but Portugal refused all advances. Only Sweden (1783) and Prussia (1785) made treaties guaranteeing reciprocal commercial privileges. After the 1st Congress was seated, passage of a tariff bill became one of the most pressing issues. These tariffs were consistent with mercantilist policies practiced by European powers at the time. To enable the federal government to collect the import duties, Congress also passed the Collection Act of 1789, which established the United States Customs Service and designated ports of entry. The tariffs established by this and later acts would make up the vast majority of government revenue; more than 87 percent of the federal government's revenue between 1789 and 1800 came from import duties.

Tariffs between states are prohibited by the U.S. Constitution, per the Import-Export Clause, and all domestically made products must be imported or exported to another state tax-free. The Export Clause (Art. I, §9, clause 5) prohibits the federal government from imposing any "tax or duty ... on articles exported from any state." The clause was proposed by southern states, which feared that northern states would control Congress and raise a disproportionate amount of revenue for the federal government from southern states through taxes on exports.

No State shall, without the Consent of the Congress, lay any Imposts or Duties on Imports or Exports, except what may be absolutely necessary for executing it's [sic] inspection Laws: and the net Produce of all Duties and Imposts, laid by any State on Imports or Exports, shall be for the Use of the Treasury of the United States; and all such Laws shall be subject to the Revision and Controul [sic] of the Congress.

— United States Constitution Article I, § 10, Clause 2

== Early National period, 1789–1828 ==
The framers of the United States Constitution gave the federal government authority to tax, stating that Congress has the power to "... lay and collect taxes, duties, imposts and excises, pay the debts and provide for the common defense and general welfare of the United States." and also "To regulate Commerce with foreign Nations, and among the several States, and with the Indian Tribes." Tariffs between states is prohibited by the U.S. Constitution, and all domestically made products can be imported or shipped to another state tax-free.

Responding to an urgent need for revenue and a trade imbalance with England that was fast destroying the infant American industries and draining the nation of its currency, the First United States Congress passed, and President George Washington signed, the Hamilton Tariff of 1789, which authorized the collection of duties on imported goods. Customs duties as set by tariff rates up to 1860 were usually about 80–95% of all federal revenue. Having just fought a war over taxation (among other things) the U.S. Congress wanted a reliable source of income that was relatively unobtrusive and easy to collect. It also sought to protect the infant industries that had developed during the war but which were now threatened by cheaper imports, especially from England.

Tariffs and excise taxes were authorized by the United States Constitution and recommended by the first United States Secretary of the Treasury, Alexander Hamilton in 1789 to tax foreign imports and set up low excise taxes on whiskey and a few other products to provide the Federal Government with enough money to pay its operating expenses and to redeem at full value U.S. Federal debts and the debts the states had accumulated during the Revolutionary War. The Congress set low excise taxes on only a few goods, such as, whiskey, rum, tobacco, snuff and refined sugar. The tax on whiskey was highly controversial and set of massive protests by Western Farmers in the Whiskey Rebellion of 1794, which was suppressed by General Washington at the head of an army. The whiskey excise tax collected so little and was so despised it was abolished by President Thomas Jefferson in 1802.

All tariffs were on a long list of goods (dutiable goods) with different customs rates and some goods on a "free" list. Congress spent enormous amounts of time figuring out these tariff import tax schedules.

With tariffs providing the basic federal revenue, an embargo on trade, or an enemy blockade, would threaten havoc. This happened in connection with the American economic warfare against Britain in the 1807–15 period. In 1807 imports dropped by more than half and some products became much more expensive or unobtainable. Congress passed the Embargo Act of 1807 and the Non-Intercourse Act (1809) to punish British and French governments for their actions; unfortunately their main effect was to reduce imports even more. The War of 1812 brought a similar set of problems as U.S. trade was again restricted by British naval blockades. The fiscal crisis was made much worse by the abolition of the First Bank of the U.S., which was the national bank. It was reestablished right after the war.

The lack of imported goods relatively quickly gave very strong incentives to start building several U.S. industries in the Northeast. Textiles and machinery especially grew. Many new industries were set up and run profitably during the wars and about half of them failed after hostilities ceased and normal imports resumed. Industry in the U.S. was advancing up the skill set, innovation knowledge and organization curve.

The Tariff Act of 1789 imposed the first national source of revenue for the newly formed United States. The new U.S. Constitution ratified in 1789, allowed only the federal government to levy uniform tariffs. Only the federal government could set tariff rates (customs), so the old system of separate state rates disappeared. The new law taxed all imports at rates from 5 to 15 percent. These rates were primarily designed to generate revenue to pay the annual expenses of the federal government and the national debt and the debts the states had accumulated during the American War of Independence and to also promote manufactures and independence from foreign nations, especially for defense needs.

Hamilton believed that all Revolutionary War debt should be paid in full to establish and keep U.S. financial credibility. In addition to income in his Report on Manufactures Treasury Secretary Alexander Hamilton proposed a far-reaching plan to use protective tariffs as a lever for rapid industrialization. In the late 18th century the industrial age was just starting and the United States had little or no textile industry—the heart of the early Industrial Revolution. The British government having just lost the Revolutionary War tried to maintain their near monopoly on cheap and efficient textile manufacturing by prohibiting the export of textile machines, machine models or the emigration of people familiar with these machines.

Clothing in the early United States was nearly all hand made by a very time-consuming and expensive process—just like it had been made for centuries before. The new textile manufacturing techniques in Britain were often over thirty times cheaper as well as being easier to use, more efficient and productive. Hamilton believed that a stiff tariff on imports would not only raise income but "protect" and help subsidize early efforts at setting up manufacturing facilities that could compete with British products.

In 1789, Samuel Slater emigrated illegally, since he was familiar with textile manufacturing in Britain. Looking for opportunities he heard of the failing attempts at making cotton mills in Pawtucket, Rhode Island. Contacting the owners he promised to see if he could fix their mills—they offered him a full partnership if he succeeded. Declaring their early attempts unworkable he proceeded from January 1790 to December 1790 to build the first operational textile manufacturing facility in the United States. The Industrial Revolution was off and running in the United States. Initially the cost of their textiles was slightly higher than the cost of equivalent British goods but the tariff helped protect their early start-up industry.

The high protectionism tariffs Hamilton originally called for were not adopted until after the War of 1812, when nationalists such as Henry Clay and John C. Calhoun saw the need for more federal income and more industry. In wartime, they declared, having a home industry was a necessity to avoid shortages. Likewise owners of the small new factories that were springing up in the northeast to mass-produce boots, hats, nails and other common items wanted higher tariffs that would significantly protect them for a time from more efficient British producers. A 10% discount on the customs tax was offered on items imported in American ships, so that the American merchant marine would be supported.

Once industrialization and mass production started, the demand for higher and higher tariffs came from manufacturers and factory workers. They believed that their businesses should be protected from the lower wages and more efficient factories of Britain and the rest of Europe. Nearly every northern Congressman was eager to logroll a higher tariff rate for his local industry. Senator Daniel Webster, formerly a spokesperson for Boston's merchants who imported goods (and wanted low tariffs), switched dramatically to represent the manufacturing interests in the Tariff of 1824. Rates were especially high for bolts of cloth and for bar iron, of which Britain was a low-cost producer.

The culmination came in the Tariff of 1828, ridiculed by free traders as the "Tariff of Abominations", with import custom duties averaging over 25 percent. Intense political opposition to higher tariffs came from Southern Democrats and plantation owners in South Carolina who had little manufacturing industry and imported some products with high tariffs. They would have to pay more for imports. They claimed their economic interest was being unfairly injured. They attempted to "nullify" the federal tariff and spoke of secession from the Union (see the Nullification Crisis). President Andrew Jackson let it be known he would use the U.S. Army to enforce the law, and no state supported the South Carolina call for nullification. A compromise ended the crisis included a lowering of the average tariff rate over ten years to a rate of 15% to 20%.

== Second Party System, 1829–1859 ==
Tariffs soon became a major political issue as the Whigs (1832–1852) and after 1854 the Republicans wanted to protect their mostly northern industries and constituents by voting for higher tariffs and the Southern Democrats, which had very little industry but imported many goods voted for lower tariffs. Each party as it came into power voted to raise or lower tariffs under the constraints that the Federal Government always needed a certain level of revenues. The United States public debt was paid off in 1834 and President Andrew Jackson, a strong Southern Democrat, oversaw the cutting of the tariff rates roughly in half and eliminating nearly all federal excise taxes in about 1835.

Henry Clay and his Whig Party, envisioning a rapid modernization based on highly productive factories, sought a high tariff. Their key argument was that startup factories, or "infant industries", would at first be less efficient than European (British) producers. Furthermore, American factory workers were paid higher wages than their European competitors. The arguments proved highly persuasive in industrial districts. Clay's position was adopted in the 1828 and 1832 Tariff Acts.

The Nullification Crisis forced a partial abandonment of the Whig position. When the Whigs won victories in the 1840 and 1842 elections, taking control of Congress, they re-instituted higher tariffs with the Tariff of 1842. In examining these debates Moore finds that they were not precursors to Civil War. Instead they looked backward and continued the old debate whether foreign trade policy should embrace free trade or protectionism.

=== Walker Tariff ===
The Democrats won in 1844, electing James K. Polk as president. Polk succeeded in passing the Walker tariff of 1846 by uniting the rural and agricultural factions of the entire country for lower tariffs. They sought a level of a "tariff for revenue only" that would pay the cost of government but not show favoritism to one section or economic sector at the expense of another. The Walker Tariff actually increased trade with Britain and others and brought in more revenue to the federal treasury than the higher tariff. The average tariff on the Walker Tariff was about 25%. While protectionists in Pennsylvania and neighboring states were angered, the South achieved its goal of setting low tariff rates before the Civil War.

=== Low tariff of 1857 ===
The Walker Tariff remained in place until 1857, when a nonpartisan coalition lowered them again with the Tariff of 1857 to 18%. This was in response to the British repeal of their protectionist "Corn Laws".

The Democrats in Congress, dominated by Southern Democrats, wrote and passed the tariff laws in the 1830s, 1840s, and 1850s, and kept reducing rates, so that the 1857 rates were down to about 15%, a move that boosted trade so overwhelmingly that revenues actually increased, from just over $20 million in 1840 ($0.6 billion in 2024 dollars), to more than $80 million by 1856 ($2.2 billion). The South had almost no complaints but the low rates angered many Northern industrialists and factory workers, especially in Pennsylvania, who demanded protection for their growing iron industry. The Republican Party replaced the Whigs in 1854 and also favored high tariffs to stimulate industrial growth. This was part of the 1860 Republican platform.

The Morrill Tariff significantly raising tariff rates became possible only after the Southern Senators walked out of Congress when their states left the Union, leaving a Republican majority. It was signed by Democratic President James Buchanan in early March 1861 shortly before President Abraham Lincoln took office. Pennsylvania iron mills and New England woolen mills mobilized businessmen and workers to call for high tariffs, but Republican merchants wanted low tariffs. The high tariff advocates lost in 1857, but stepped up their campaign by blaming the economic recession of 1857 on the lower rates. Economist Henry Charles Carey of Philadelphia was the most outspoken advocate, along with Horace Greeley and his influential newspaper, the New-York Tribune. Increases were enacted in February 1861 after Southerners resigned their seats in Congress on the eve of the Civil War.

Some historians in recent decades have minimized the tariff issue as a cause of the war, noting that few people in 1860–61 said it was of central importance to them. Compromises were proposed in 1860–61 to save the Union, but they did not involve the tariff. Arguably, the effects of a tariff enacted in March 1861 could have made little impact upon any delegation which met prior to its signing. It is indicative of the Northern industrial supported and anti-agrarian position of that 1861 Republican controlled congress. Some secessionist documents do mention a tariff issue, though not nearly as often as the preservation of the impactful economic institution of slavery. However, a few libertarian economists place more importance on the tariff issue.

== 1860–1912 ==
=== Civil War ===
During the war far more revenue was needed, so the rates were raised again and again, along with many other taxes such as excise taxes on luxuries and income taxes on the rich. By far most of the wartime government revenue came from bonds and loans ($2.6 billion), not taxes ($357 million) or tariffs ($305 million).

The Morrill Tariff took effect a few weeks before the war began on April 12, 1861, and was not collected in the South. The Confederate States of America (CSA) passed its own tariff of about 15% on most items, including many items that previously were duty-free from the North. Previously tariffs between states were prohibited. The Confederates believed that they could finance their government by tariffs. The anticipated tariff revenue never appeared as the Union Navy blockaded their ports and the Union army restricted their trade with the Northern states. The Confederacy collected a mere $3.5 million in tariff revenue from the Civil War start to end and had to resort to inflation and confiscation instead for revenue.

=== Reconstruction era ===
Historian Howard K. Beale argued that high tariffs were needed during the Civil War, but were retained after the war for the benefit of Northern industrialists, who would otherwise lose markets and profits. To keep political control of Congress, Beale argued, Northern Industrialists worked through the Republican Party and supported Reconstruction policies that kept low-tariff Southern whites out of power. The Beale thesis was widely disseminated by the influential survey of Charles A. Beard, The Rise of American Civilization (1927).

In the late 1950s historians rejected the Beale–Beard thesis by showing that Northern businessmen were evenly divided on the tariff, and were not using Reconstruction policies to support it.

=== Politics of protection ===
The iron and steel industry, and the wool industry, were the well-organized interests groups that demanded, and usually obtained, high tariffs through support of the Republican Party. Industrial workers had much higher wages than their European counterparts, and they credited it to the tariff and voted Republican.

Democrats were divided on the issue, in large part because of pro-tariff elements in the Pennsylvania party who wanted to protect the growing iron industry, as well as pockets of high tariff support in nearby industrializing states. However President Grover Cleveland made low tariffs the centerpiece of Democratic Party policies in the late 1880s. His argument is that high tariffs were an unnecessary and unfair tax on consumers. The South and West generally supported low tariffs, and the industrial East high tariffs. Republican William McKinley was the outstanding spokesman for high tariffs, promising it would bring prosperity for all groups.

After the Civil War, high tariffs remained as the Republican Party remained in office and the Southern Democrats were restricted from office. Advocates insisted that tariffs brought prosperity to the nation as a whole and no one was really injured. As industrialization proceeded apace throughout the Northeast, some Democrats, especially Pennsylvanians, became high tariff advocates.

=== Farmers and wool ===
The Republican high tariff advocates appealed to farmers with the theme that high-wage factory workers would pay premium prices for foodstuffs. This was the "home market" idea, and it won over most farmers in the Northeast, but it had little relevance to the southern and western farmers who exported most of their cotton, tobacco and wheat. In the late 1860s the wool manufacturers, based near Boston and Philadelphia, formed the first national lobby, and cut deals with wool-growing farmers in several states. Their challenge was that fastidious wool producers in Britain and Australia marketed a higher quality fleece than the Americans, and that British manufacturers had costs as low as the American mills. The result was a wool tariff that helped the farmers by a high rate on imported wool—a tariff the American manufacturers had to pay—together with a high tariff on finished woolens and worsted goods.

=== U.S. industrial output ===
Apart from wool and woolens, American industry and agriculture—and industrial workers—had become the most efficient in the world by the 1880s as they took the lead in the worldwide Industrial Revolution. They were not at risk from cheap imports. No other country had the industrial capacity, large market, the high efficiency and low costs, or the complex distribution system needed to compete in the vast American market. Indeed, it was the British who watched in stunned horror as cheaper American products flooded their home islands. Wailed the London Daily Mail in 1900,

We have lost to the American manufacturer electrical machinery, locomotives, steel rails, sugar-producing and agricultural machinery, and latterly even stationary engines, the pride and backbone of the British engineering industry.

Some American manufacturers and union workers demanded the high tariff be maintained. The tariff represented a complex balance of forces. Railroads, for example, consumed vast quantities of steel. To the extent tariffs raised steel prices, they paid much more, making possible the U.S steel industry's massive investment to expand capacity and switch to the Bessemer process and later to the open hearth furnace. Between 1867 and 1900, U.S. steel production increased more than 500 times from 22,000 tons to 11,400,000 tons. Bessemer steel rails, first made in the U.S., lasted 18 years under heavy traffic, replaced the old wrought iron rail that lasted two years under light service.

In 1881, British steel rails sold for $31 a ton, and if Americans imported them they paid a $28/ton tariff, giving $59/ton for an imported ton of rails. American mills charged $61 a ton—and made a huge profit, which was then reinvested into increased capacity, higher quality steels and more efficient production. By 1897, the American steel rail price had dropped to $19.60 per ton compared to the British price at $21.00—not including the $7.84 duty charge.

The U.S. steel industry became an exporter of steel rail to England selling below the British price and during WW I would become the largest supplier of steel to the allies. From 1915 to 1918, the largest American steel company, U.S. Steel, alone delivered more steel each year than Germany and Austria-Hungary combined, totalling 99,700,000 tons during WW I. The Republicans became masters of negotiating exceedingly complex arrangements so that inside each of their congressional districts there were more satisfied "winners" than disgruntled "losers". The tariff after 1880 was an ideological relic that no longer had any economic rationale.

=== Cleveland tariff policy ===
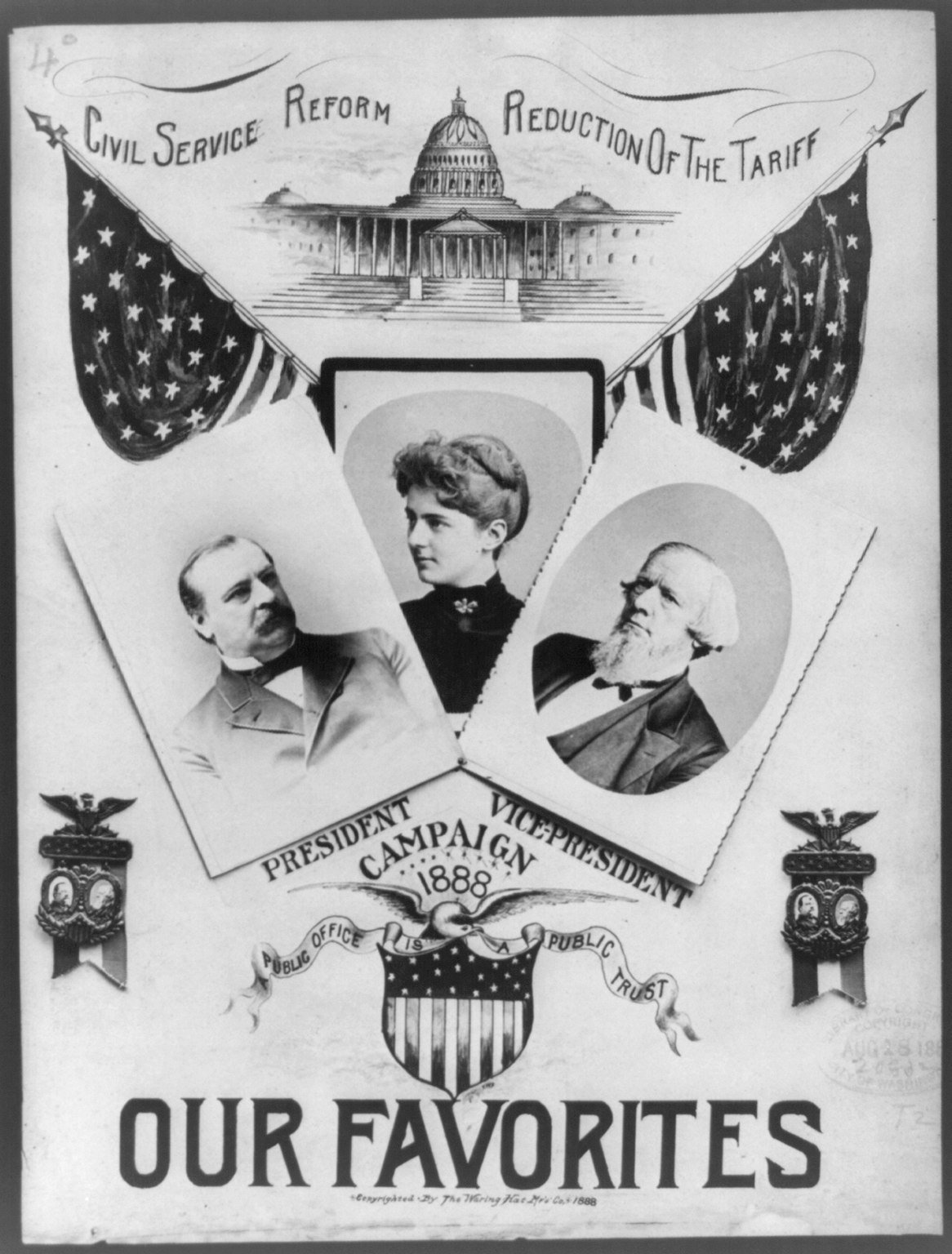
1888 Democratic presidential campaign poster featuring Grover Cleveland promoting tariff reduction and civil service reform.

Democratic President Grover Cleveland redefined the issue in 1887, with his stunning attack on the tariff as inherently corrupt, opposed to true republicanism, and inefficient to boot: "When we consider that the theory of our institutions guarantees to every citizen the full enjoyment of all the fruits of his industry and enterprise ... it is plain that the exaction of more than [minimal taxes] is indefensible extortion and a culpable betrayal of American fairness and justice." The election of 1888 was fought primarily over the tariff issue, and Cleveland lost. Republican Congressman William McKinley argued,

Free foreign trade gives our money, our manufactures, and our markets to other nations to the injury of our labor, our tradespeople, and our farmers. Protection keeps money, markets, and manufactures at home for the benefit of our own people.

Democrats campaigned energetically against the high McKinley Tariff of 1890, and scored sweeping gains that year; they restored Cleveland to the White House in 1892. The severe depression that started in 1893 ripped apart the Democratic party. Cleveland and the pro-business Bourbon Democrats insisted on a much lower tariff. His problem was that Democratic electoral successes had brought in Democratic congressmen from industrial districts who were willing to raise rates to benefit their constituents. The Wilson–Gorman Tariff Act of 1894 lowered overall rates from 50 percent to 42 percent, but contained so many concessions to protectionism that Cleveland refused to sign it. It later became law.

=== McKinley tariff policy ===
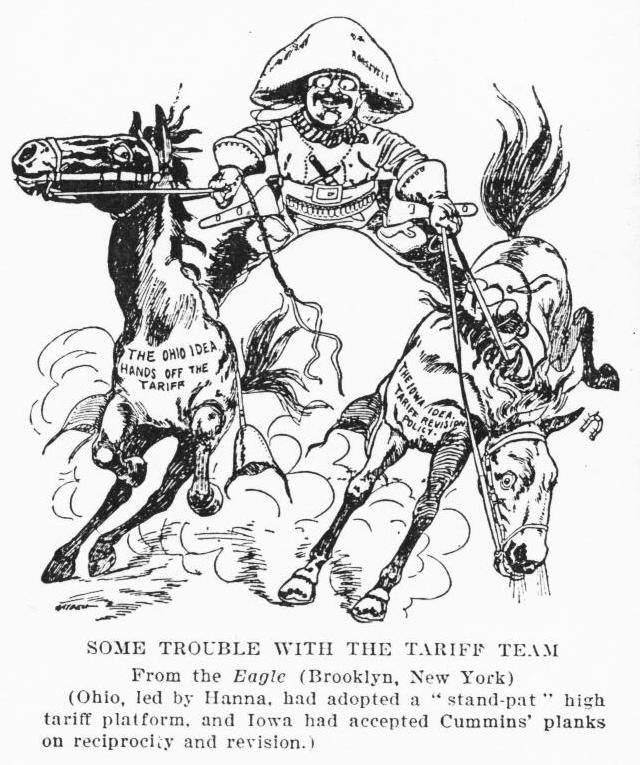
President Teddy Roosevelt watches the GOP team pull apart on tariff issue.

McKinley campaigned heavily in 1896 on the high tariff as a positive solution to depression. Promising protection and prosperity to every economic sector, he won a smashing victory. The Republicans rushed through the Dingley Tariff in 1897, boosting rates back to the 50 percent level. Democrats responded that the high rates created government sponsored "trusts" (monopolies) and led to higher consumer prices. McKinley won reelection by an even bigger landslide and started talking about a post-tariff era of reciprocal trade agreements. Reciprocity went nowhere; McKinley's vision was a half century too early.

The Republicans split bitterly on the Payne–Aldrich Tariff of 1909. Republican President Theodore Roosevelt (1901–1909) saw the tariff issue was ripping his party apart, so he postponed any consideration of it. The delicate balance flew apart on under Republican William Howard Taft. He campaigned for president in 1908 for tariff "reform", which everyone assumed meant lower rates. The House lowered rates with the Payne Bill, then sent it to the Senate where Nelson Wilmarth Aldrich mobilized high-rate Senators.

Aldrich was a New England businessman and a master of the complexities of the tariff, the Midwestern Republican insurgents were rhetoricians and lawyers who distrusted the special interests and assumed the tariff was "sheer robbery" at the expense of the ordinary consumer. Rural America believed that its superior morality deserved special protection, while the immorality of the trusts—and cities generally—merited financial punishment. Aldrich baited them. His Payne–Aldrich Tariff Act of 1909 lowered the protection on Midwestern farm products, while raising rates favorable to his Northeast.

By 1913 with the new income tax generating revenue, the Democrats in Congress were able to reduce rates with the Underwood Tariff. The outbreak of war in 1914 made the impact of tariffs of much less importance compared to war contracts. When the Republicans returned to power the returned the rates to a high level in the Fordney–McCumber Tariff of 1922. The next raise came with the Smoot–Hawley Tariff Act of 1930 at the start of the Great Depression.

=== Tariff with Canada ===
The Canadian–American Reciprocity Treaty increased trade between 1855 and its ending in 1866. When it ended, Canada turned to tariffs. The National Policy was a Canadian economic program introduced by John A. Macdonald's Conservative Party in 1879 after it returned to power. It had been an official policy, however, since 1876. It was based on high tariffs to protect Canada's manufacturing industry. Macdonald campaigned on the policy in the 1878 election, and handily beat the Liberal Party, which supported free trade.

The Payne Aldrich Tariff of 1909 actually changed little and had slight economic impact one way or the other, but the political impact was enormous. The insurgents felt tricked and defeated and swore vengeance against Wall Street and its minions Taft and Aldrich. The insurgency led to a fatal split down the middle in 1912 as the GOP lost its balance wheel.

Efforts to restore free trade with Canada collapsed when Canada rejected a proposed reciprocity treaty in fear of American imperialism in the 1911 federal election. Taft negotiated a reciprocity agreement with Canada, that had the effect of sharply lowering tariffs. Democrats supported the plan but Midwestern Republicans bitterly opposed it. Barnstorming the country for his agreement, Taft undiplomatically pointed to the inevitable integration of the North American economy, and suggested that Canada should come to a "parting of the ways" with Britain. Canada's Conservative Party, under the leadership of Robert Borden, now had an issue to regain power from the low-tariff Liberals. After a surge of pro-imperial anti-Americanism, the Conservatives won. Ottawa rejected reciprocity, reasserted the National Policy and went to London first for new financial and trade deals.

== 1913 to present ==
Woodrow Wilson made a drastic lowering of tariff rates a major priority for his presidency. The 1913 Underwood Tariff cut rates, but the coming of World War I in 1914 radically revised trade patterns. Reduced trade and, especially, the new revenues generated by the federal income tax (bolstered by the ratification of the Sixteenth Amendment in 1913) made tariffs much less important in terms of economic impact and political rhetoric.

The Wilson administration desired a 'revamping' of the current banking system, "...so that the banks may be the instruments, not the masters, of business and of individual enterprise and initiative.". President Wilson achieved this in the Federal Reserve Act of 1913. Working with the bullish Senator Aldrich and former presidential candidate William Jennings Bryan, he perfected a way to centralize the banking system to allow Congress to closely allocate paper money production. The Federal Reserve Act, with the Sixteenth Amendment of the Constitution, would create a trend of new forms of government funding.

When the Republicans regained power after the war they restored the usual high rates, with the Fordney–McCumber Tariff of 1922. When the Great Depression hit, international trade shrank drastically. The crisis baffled the GOP, and it tried to raise tariffs again with the Smoot–Hawley Tariff Act of 1930. This time it backfired, as Canada, Britain, Germany, France and other industrial countries retaliated with their own tariffs and special, bilateral trade deals.

American imports and exports both went into a tailspin. Franklin D. Roosevelt and the New Dealers made promises about lowering tariffs on a reciprocal country-by-country basis, which they did, hoping this would expand foreign trade, which it did not. Frustrated, they gave much more attention to domestic remedies for the depression. By 1936 the tariff issue had faded from politics, and the revenue it raised was small. In World War II, both tariffs and reciprocity were insignificant compared to trade channeled through Lend-Lease.

=== Tariffs and Great Depression ===
Economist Douglas A. Irwin assesses the impact of the Smoot-Hawley Act: in the two years following the imposition of the Smoot-Hawley tariff in June 1930, the volume of U.S. imports fell by over 40%. He shows that part of this collapse in trade is attributed to the tariff itself, and not to other factors such as falling incomes or foreign retaliation. Partial and general equilibrium evaluations indicate that the Smoot-Hawley tariff reduced imports by between 4% and 8% (ceteris paribus). In addition, a counterfactual simulation suggests that almost a quarter of the observed 40% drop in imports can be attributed to the increase in the effective tariff (i.e. Smoot-Hawley plus deflation).

Irwin argues that while the Smoot-Hawley Tariff Act was not the primary cause of the Great Depression, it contributed to its severity by provoking international retaliation and reducing global trade. The Smoot-Hawley Tariff Act raised the average level of tariffs on dutiable imports by 15 to 18 percent. What mitigated the impact of Smoot-Hawley was the small size of the trade sector at the time. Only a third of total imports to the United States in 1930 were subject to duties, and those dutiable imports represented only 1.4 percent of GDP. According to Irwin, there is no evidence that the legislation achieved its goals of net job creation or economic recovery. Even from a Keynesian perspective, the policy was counterproductive, as the decline in exports exceeded the reduction in imports. While falling foreign incomes were a key factor in the collapse of U.S. exports, the tariff also limited foreign access to U.S. dollars, appreciating the currency and making American goods less competitive abroad. Irwin emphasizes that one of the most damaging consequences of the Act was the deterioration of the United States' trade relations with key partners. Enacted at a time when the League of Nations was seeking to implement a global "tariff truce", the Smoot-Hawley Tariff was widely perceived as a unilateral and hostile move, undermining international cooperation. In his assessment, the most significant long-term impact was that the resentment it generated encouraged other countries to form discriminatory trading blocs. These preferential arrangements, diverted trade away from the United States and hindered the global economic recovery.

In a November 2024 article,The Economist observed that the Act, "which raised average tariffs on imports by around 20% and incited a tit-for-tat trade war, was devastatingly effective: global trade fell by two-thirds. It was so catastrophic global trade fell by two-thirds. It was so catastrophic for growth in America and around the world that legislators have not touched the issue since. 'Smoot-Hawley' became synonymous with disastrous policy making".

Economist Milton Friedman argued that while the tariffs of 1930 caused harm, they were not the main cause for the Great Depression. He placed greater blame on the lack of sufficient action on the part of the Federal Reserve.

Paul Krugman writes that protectionism does not lead to recessions. According to him, the decrease in imports (which can be obtained by introducing tariffs) has an expansive effect, that is, it is favourable to growth. Thus, in a trade war, since exports and imports will decrease equally, for everyone, the negative effect of a decrease in exports will be offset by the expansionary effect of a decrease in imports. Therefore, a trade war does not cause a recession. Furthermore, in his view, the Smoot–Hawley Tariff Act did not cause the Great Depression and that the decline in trade between 1929 and 1933 "was almost entirely a consequence of the Depression, not a cause. Trade barriers were a response to the Depression".

=== Trade liberalization ===
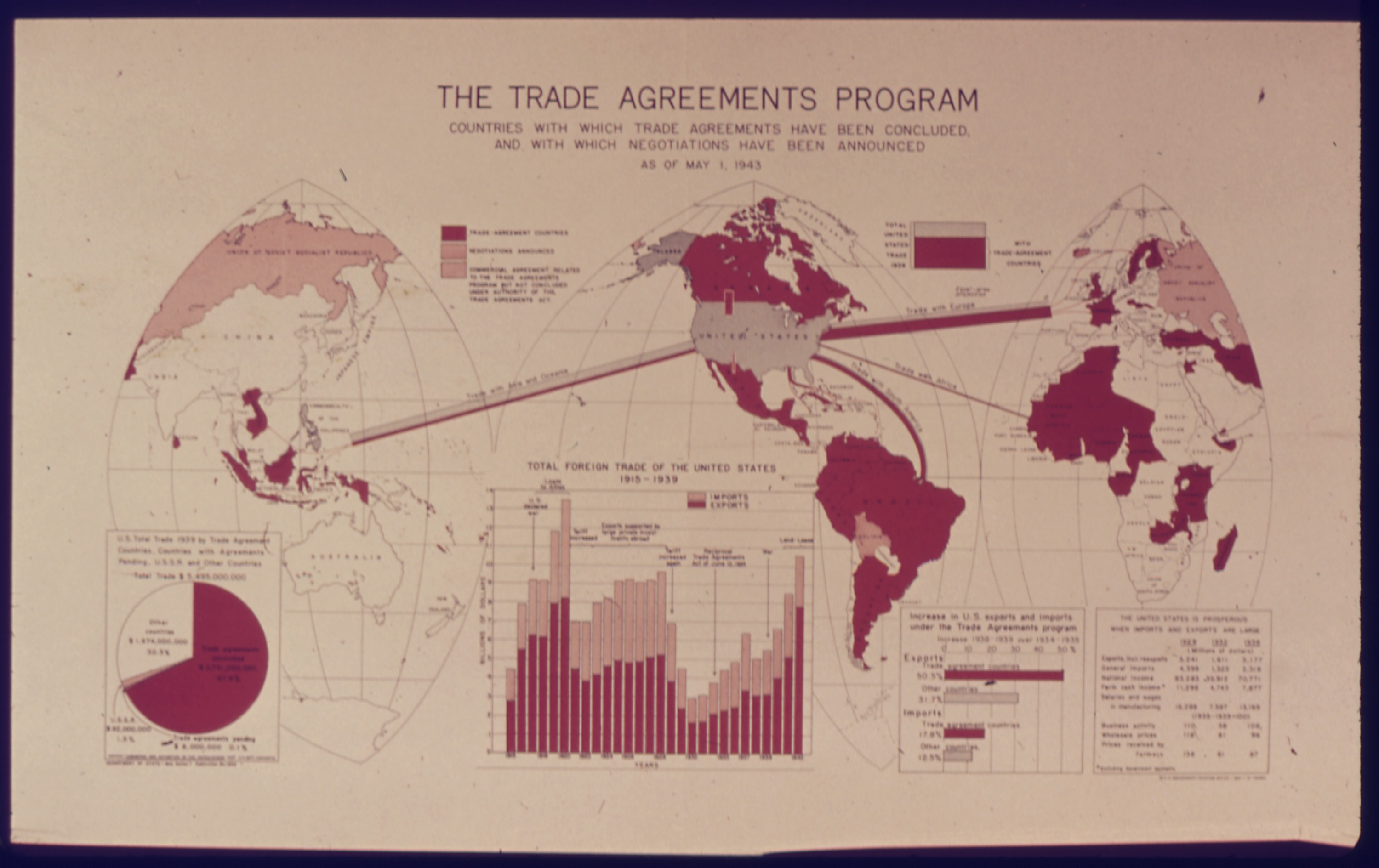
The trade agreements program of the United States (1943)

Tariffs up to the Smoot–Hawley Tariff Act of 1930, were set by Congress after many months of testimony and negotiations. In 1934, the U.S. Congress, in a rare delegation of authority, passed the Reciprocal Tariff Act of 1934, which authorized the executive branch to negotiate bilateral tariff reduction agreements with other countries. The prevailing view then was that trade liberalization may help stimulate economic growth. However, no one country was willing to liberalize unilaterally. Between 1934 and 1945, the executive branch negotiated over 32 bilateral trade liberalization agreements with other countries.

The belief that low tariffs led to a more prosperous country are now the predominant belief with some exceptions. Multilateralism is embodied in the seven tariff reduction rounds that occurred between 1948 and 1994. In each of these "rounds", all General Agreement on Tariffs and Trade (GATT) members came together to negotiate mutually agreeable trade liberalization packages and reciprocal tariff rates. In the Uruguay round in 1994, the World Trade Organization (WTO) was established to help establish uniform tariff rates.

=== Post World War II ===
After the war the U.S. promoted the General Agreement on Tariffs and Trade (GATT) established in 1947, to minimize tariffs and other restrictions, and to liberalize trade among all capitalist countries. In 1995 GATT became the World Trade Organization (WTO); with the collapse of Communism its open markets/low tariff ideology became dominant worldwide in the 1990s.

American industry and labor prospered after World War II, but hard times set in after 1970. For the first time there was stiff competition from low-cost producers around the globe. Many rust belt industries faded or collapsed, especially the manufacture of steel, TV sets, shoes, toys, textiles and clothing. Toyota and Nissan threatened the giant domestic auto industry. In the late 1970s, Detroit and the auto workers union combined to fight for protection. They obtained not high tariffs, but a voluntary restriction of exports from the Japanese government.

Quotas were two-country diplomatic agreements that had the same protective effect as high tariffs, but did not invite retaliation from third countries. By limiting the number of automobiles that could be imported into the USA from Japan, quotas inadvertently helped Japanese companies push into larger, and more expensive market segments. The Japanese producers, limited by the number of cars they could export to America, opted to increase the value of their exports to maintain revenue growth. This action threatened the American producers' historical hold on the mid- and large-size car markets.

Under the Eisenhower, Kennedy, Johnson and Nixon administrations, increasing numbers of Voluntary Export Restraint agreements were also secured with Japan, South Korea, Taiwan, Hong Kong and European countries to avert the application of trade barriers by the US. Products subjected to quotas included textiles, plywood, sewing machines, flatware, tuna, woodscrews, steel, steel and iron products, glass, footwear, and electronics.

The chicken tax was a 1964 response by President Lyndon B. Johnson to tariffs placed by Germany (then West Germany) on importation of US chicken. Beginning in 1962, during the President Kennedy administration, the US accused Europe of unfairly restricting imports of American poultry at the request of West German chicken farmers. Diplomacy failed, and in January 1964, two months after taking office, President Johnson retaliated by imposing a 25 percent tax on all imported light trucks. This directly affected the German built Volkswagen vans.

Officially, it was explained that the light trucks tax would offset the dollar amount of imports of Volkswagen vans from West Germany with the lost American sales of chickens to Europe. But audio tapes from the Johnson White House reveal that in January 1964, President Johnson was attempting to convince United Auto Workers's president Walter Reuther, not to initiate a strike just prior the 1964 election and to support the president's civil rights platform. Reuther in turn wanted Johnson to respond to Volkswagen's increased shipments to the United States.

=== 1980s to present ===
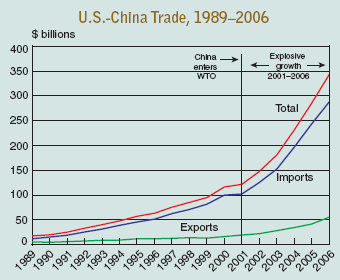
US trade with China, 1989 to 2006. China gained entry to the WTO as most favored nation in the early 2000s.

During the Reagan and George H. W. Bush administrations Republicans abandoned protectionist policies, and came out against quotas and in favor of the GATT/WTO policy of minimal economic barriers to global trade. Free trade with Canada came about as a result of the Canada–U.S. Free Trade Agreement of 1987, which led in 1994 to the North American Free Trade Agreement (NAFTA). It was based on Reagan's plan to enlarge the scope of the market for American firms to include Canada and Mexico. President Bill Clinton, with strong Republican support in 1993, pushed NAFTA through Congress over the vehement objection of labor unions.

In 2000 Clinton worked with Republicans to give China entry into WTO and "most favored nation" trading status (i.e., the same low tariffs promised to any other WTO member). NAFTA and WTO advocates promoted an optimistic vision of the future, with prosperity to be based on intellectuals skills and managerial know-how more than on routine hand labor. They promised that free trade meant lower prices for consumers.

Opposition to liberalized trade came increasingly from labor unions, who argued that this system also meant lower wages and fewer jobs for American workers who could not compete against wages of less than a dollar an hour. The shrinking size and diminished political clout of these unions repeatedly left them on the losing side. Nevertheless, John Tsang, then Hong Kong's Secretary for Commerce, Industry and Technology and chair of the Sixth Ministerial Conference of the World Trade Organization, MC6, noted in 2005 that the US spent US$20 billion per year on "trade-distorting support".

A large majority of observational studies have found that voters' economic hardships influence their support of protectionism. This was corroborated by 2016 United States presidential election, in which Donald Trump was broadly supported in the Rust Belt. However, experimental studies find that support for protectionism is not sufficiently, or even necessarily, related to an individual's economic circumstances, but instead is deeply rooted in domestic politics.

Despite overall decreases in international tariffs, some tariffs have been more resistant to change. For example, due partially to tariff pressure from the European Common Agricultural Policy, US agricultural subsidies have seen little decrease over the past few decades, even in the face of recent pressure from the WTO during the latest Doha talks.

Presently only about 30% of all import goods are subject to tariffs in the United States, the rest are on the free list. The "average" tariffs now charged by the United States are at a historic low. The list of negotiated tariffs are listed on the Harmonized Tariff Schedule as put out by the United States International Trade Commission.

== Public opinion on protectionism and free trade ==
Opinions on trade and protectionism have fluctuated since the early 2000s. Opinions recently have decided roughly of partisan lines. In 2017, while 67% of Democrats believe free trade agreements are good for the United States, only 36% of Republicans agree. When asked if free trade has helped respondents specifically, the approval numbers for Democrats drop to 54%, however approval ratings among Republicans remain relatively unchanged at 34%.

The 2016 election marked the beginning of the trend of returning to protectionism, an ideology incorporated into Donald Trump's platform. During the Republican primary, Trump voters had a much more positive view of protectionism and "economic nationalism" than Cruz or Kasich voters. However, after the election there seems to have been a push-back against such sentiments, with an uptick in support for free trade agreements in both parties, with 72% of respondents saying international trade was an opportunity, not a threat.

Scholars, such as Michael J. Hiscox, have argued that public opinion of international trade and protectionism is particularly malleable to political framing because of the complexity of the issue. Due to this complexity, the public is more likely to look to the elites in their own political parties to form their opinions.

From 2005 to 2018, American favorability towards NAFTA increased at a relatively stable rate, with 48% of people believing the deal has been good for the United States in 2018 compared to only 38% in 2005.

== See also ==
- American System (economic plan)
- Tariffs in United States history
- Business nationalism
- China–United States trade war
- List of the largest trading partners of the United States
- List of largest trading partners of India
- Tariffs in the second Trump administration
- Trade Adjustment Assistance
