= Strafford Village Historic District =

Historic district in Vermont, United States

- U.S. National Register of Historic Places
- U.S. Historic district
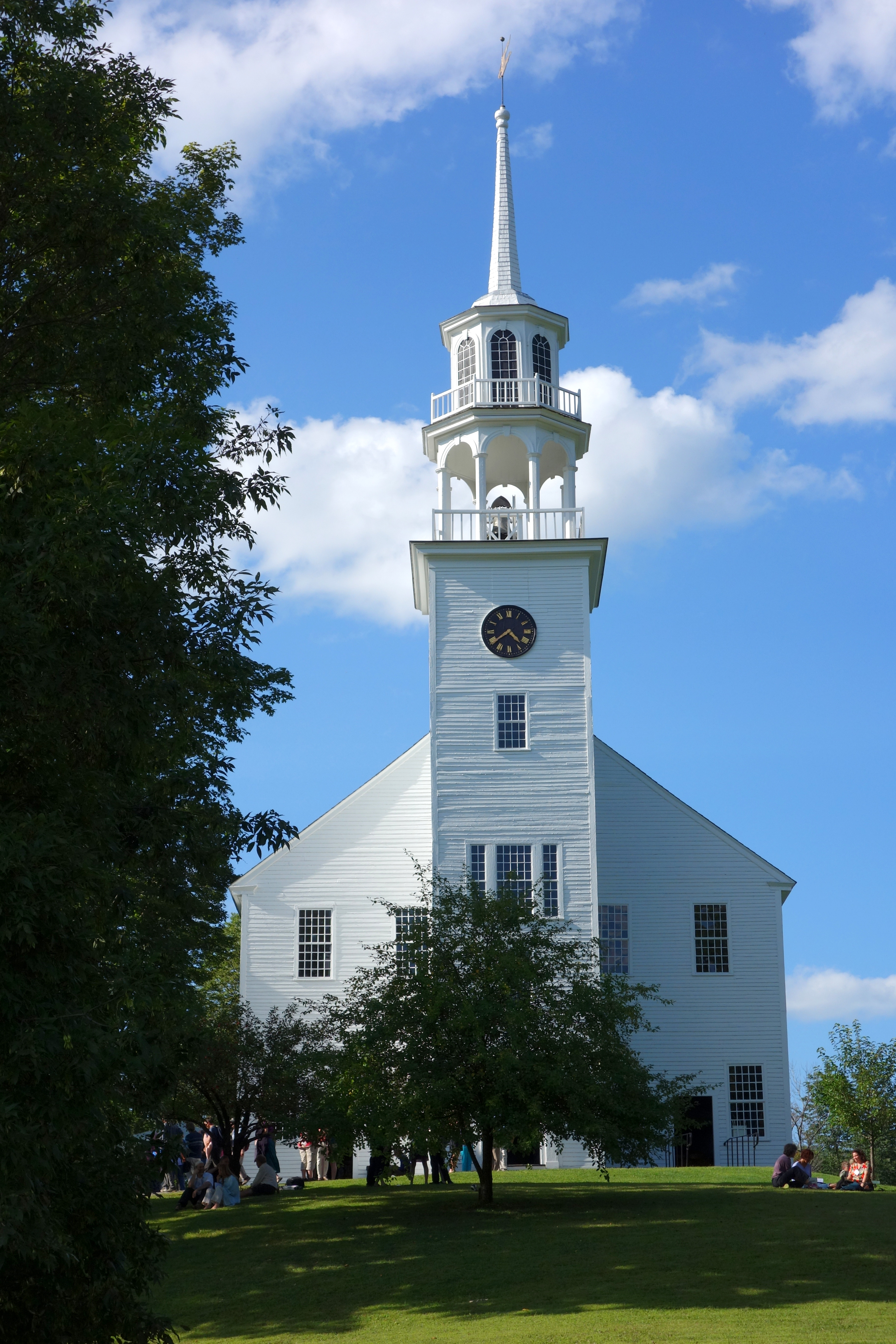
- The 1799 meeting house

- Location within Vermont Location within the United States
- Location: Roughly both sides of Morrill Hwy. and Sharon Brook Rd., Strafford, Vermont, United States
- Coordinates: 43°51′54″N 72°22′44″W
- Area: 120 acres (49 ha)
- Built: 1768
- Architectural style: Greek Revival, Gothic Revival
- NRHP reference No.: 74000246
- Added to NRHP: June 20, 1974

The Strafford Village Historic District encompasses the historic village center of Strafford, Vermont, United States. Founded in 1768, the village center was developed in the 1790s, and saw most of its growth before 1840, resulting in a fine assortment of predominantly Greek Revival buildings. Notable exceptions include the 1799 meetinghouse, and the Justin Smith Morrill Homestead, a fine example of Gothic Revival architecture built by native son Justin Smith Morrill. The district, centered on the town green at the junction of Morrill Highway and Brook Road, was listed on the National Register of Historic Places in 1974.

== Description and history ==
The town of Strafford was chartered in 1768 by Province of New Hampshire governor Benning Wentworth. Its original town center was located north of the present one, which grew in importance because of the presence of the meetinghouse and the location of the turnpike (now Morrill Highway) between Montpelier, Vermont and Boston, Massachusetts. The area was economically boosted in the 1820s by the discovery of copper ore in the surrounding hills, but declined after larger deposits were found in the American Midwest in the 1840s.

Strafford's village center is defined by a triangular green, formed by the Y-shaped junction of the Justin Morrill Smith Highway (running north-south) and Brook Road (running roughly northwest). At the large northern end of the triangle stands the 1799 meetinghouse, a fine example of Federal period architecture externally, with late 19th-century interior decoration. Facing the green and extending a short way beyond are a number of residences, typically one and two stories in height, and of wood construction with Greek Revival styling. Near the southern end of the district stands the Morrill Homestead, a National Historic Landmark that is also a state historic site open to the public during the warmer months of the year. Just north of the Morrill Homestead stands the town's present library, a 1915 Colonial Revival building. Its first library building, built in the 19th century and located on the west side of the green, now houses town offices. On the east side of the green, standing among residences, is the Greek Revival Union Church.

== See also ==
- National Register of Historic Places listings in Orange County, Vermont
