= Justin Smith Morrill Homestead =

Historic house in Vermont, United States

- Justin S. Morrill Homestead
- U.S. National Register of Historic Places
- U.S. National Historic Landmark
- U.S. Historic district – Contributing property
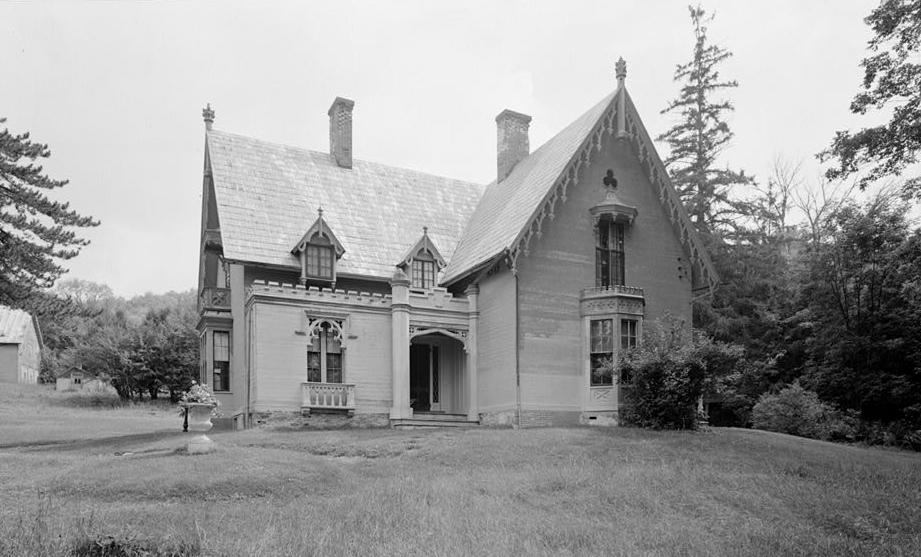
- Justin Smith Morrill House, from Historic American Buildings Survey

- Location within Vermont Location within the United States
- Location: Strafford, Vermont
- Coordinates: 43°51′46.4″N 72°22′33.4″W
- Area: 3 acres (1.2 ha)
- Built: 1855
- Architect: Justin Smith Morrill
- Architectural style: Carpenter Gothic
- Part of: Strafford Village Historic District (ID74000246)
- NRHP reference No.: 66000795

Significant dates
- Added to NRHP: October 15, 1966
- Designated NHL: September 22, 1960
- Designated CP: June 20, 1974

The Justin Smith Morrill Homestead is the historic Carpenter Gothic home of United States Senator Justin Smith Morrill (1810–98) in Strafford, Vermont, and was one of the first declared National Historic Landmarks, in 1960. It is located at 214 Justin Morrill Highway, south of the village green of Strafford. The homestead is a Vermont State Historic Site owned by the Vermont Division for Historic Preservation, a state agency, and is open for tours from May to October.

== Description and history ==
The Morrill Homestead is set on 3 acres (1.2 ha) of land on the east side of Justin Morrill Memorial Highway, just south of the village green and the heart of Strafford Village. The property includes, in addition to the main house, several barns and sheds as outbuildings, and is set off from the road by a flush-boarded fence with granite posts, all painted a reddish color.

The main house is a rambling 1 1/2-story wood-frame structure, set on a brick foundation. The walls are finished in flushboarding, and it has a steeply pitched slate roof. Portions of the roof are decorated with vergeboard, finials, and crenellated parapets. The interior features elaborate mahogany woodwork, and is predominantly Gothic Revival in character (matching the building's exterior), although the main parlor is more Greek Revival in character. Original furnishings and Morrill family possessions remain in the house, from the furniture to linens and kitchen implements. The interior walls have seen only minimal alterations, which have generally been limited to maintenance such as new coats of paint. Exterior alterations are similarly modest, including the replacement of rotted trim elements with matching materials.

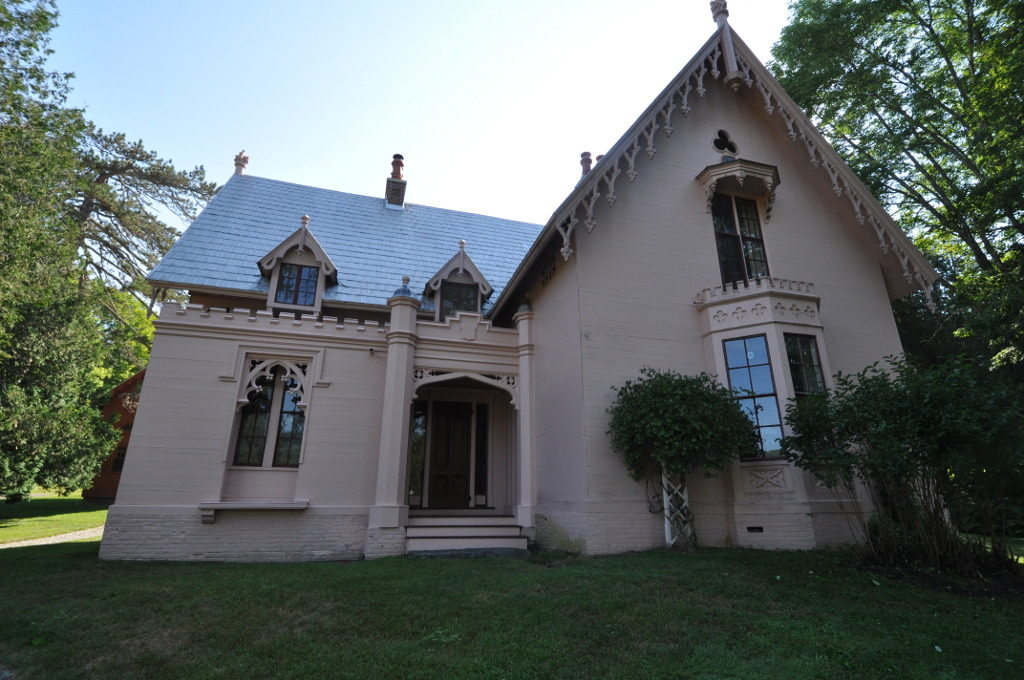
The house in 2016.

The main construction phase of the house was between 1848 and 1851, and was personally overseen by Justin Morrill to his own design. Its year of completion was also the year of Morrill's marriage to Ruth Barrell Swan, with whom he had two children. Morrill primarily used the house as a summer residence, as a spent much of his time in Washington, DC, where he died in 1898. The property remained in the Morrill family, with little alteration, until World War II, when the property was sold to a concern planning to establish a boarding school. This plan was quickly shelved, and the house was then acquired by preservationists, who sold it to the state in 1969.

Morrill's primary legacy to the nation consists of two landmark pieces of legislation, both bearing his name. The Morrill Land-Grant Acts of 1862 and 1890 respective established and expanded on the concept of the land-grant university, by which the federal government gave land (and in the 1890 act, funding) to the states for the establishment of universities. These acts made possible the establishment of a significant number of state-run universities, as well as a few private schools that were contracted to the state to fulfill the requirements needed to receive the federal grants.

Other significant accomplishments by Morrill during his long tenure in Congress include seeing through the completion of the Washington Monument, the construction of the Library of Congress Building, and the landscaping of the United States Capitol Building grounds.

== See also ==
- List of National Historic Landmarks in Vermont
- National Register of Historic Places listings in Orange County, Vermont
