= South Strafford, Vermont =

- Village
- Location within Vermont Location within the United States
- Coordinates: 43°50′07″N 72°21′58″W
- Country: United States
- State: Vermont
- County: Orange
- Elevation: 919 ft (280 m)
- Time zone: UTC-5 (Eastern (EST))
  - Summer (DST): UTC-4 (EDT)
- ZIP code: 05070
- Area code: 802
- GNIS feature ID: 1459616

South Strafford is an unincorporated village in the town of Strafford, Orange County, Vermont, United States. The community is located along Vermont Route 132, 10 miles (16 km) northwest of Hanover, New Hampshire. South Strafford has a post office, with ZIP code 05070.
