= Barbara Moraff =

American poet (1939–2024)

- Born: April 19, 1939; Paterson, New Jersey, U.S.
- Died: April 2024 (aged 84–85); Danville, Vermont, U.S.
- Education: Columbia University
- Children: 2

Barbara Ellen Moraff (April 19, 1939 – April 2024) was an American poet of the Beat Generation who lived in Vermont.

== Biography ==
=== Writing career ===
Barbara Moraff was born in Paterson, New Jersey on April 19, 1939. She moved to New York City where she began taking classes at Columbia University, became friends with fellow Patersonian, Allen Ginsberg.

Jack Kerouac called Moraff "the baby of the Beat generation" because she was just 18 when they met but was already being published by Leroi Jones and in Evergreen Review. She was reading in various New York City coffeehouses when she was able to get out of a very restrictive home environment—complicated by plastic surgery needed to repair her face after a mutilation. In a 1964 interview with Paideuma (University of Maine), Kerouac called Moraff "the best girl poet writing in America". "

In the 1960s Moraff was experimenting with writing SOUND poetry. Robert Duncan sent a poem by her to Denise Levertov.

She studied human nutrition to create a nutritional plan for her son, who, like her, also had cystic fibrosis. This resulted in the writing of The Cookbook/Handbook to Nutrition for Kids Who Have Cystic Fibrosis. Moraff self-published the book; it can be found in the CF Foundation's library.

Moraff began writing poetry again in 1976 when asked by a feminist lesbian press to sit on its editorial board. There she edited the magazine CONCH and co-edited an anthology of local women's writings and art. This included the first published work of Louise Erdrich.

In 2007, Moraff was editing and collating a collection of previously published and unpublished work and was also working on a new collection (tentative title Machig Labdron Songs). In 2007 came a booklet from Longhouse Publishers, FOOTPRINT.

=== Personal life and death ===
Moraff and her partner moved to Vermont in late 1961, where they built a small one-room cabin on land belonging to a former Black Mountain College student with whom they exchanged work for rent.

Moraff's first child, Alesia, was born in 1966, and shortly afterward Moraff bought a remote hilltop farm in Strafford, Vermont. She taught herself organic farming practices and for many years raised the family's food and kept a cow and two goats. She made cheese and studied medicinal herbs. Her son Marco was born in 1971. Marco grew healthy and ran long-distance track in high school. He became an artist, and many of his works are now in private collections. He also designed and built furniture using driftwood, branchwood, marble, and slate. He died in April 2007 as a result of his cystic fibrosis.

In 1972 he was diagnosed with cystic fibrosis. Moraff met Chogyam Trungpa in 1974 through Allen Ginsberg. She thought she could learn Tibetan Buddhist breathing methods to help Marco develop lungs strong enough to resist the early ravages of CF. Moraff continued her Buddhist practice and study, attending the last seminary at which Trungpa was present, and later, ngedon school.

In 1973, Moraff founded Vermont Artisans, Vermont's first craft sales and educational cooperative.

Although partially disabled, Moraff was still able to produce some pottery, mostly commissioned dinner sets. In the summer, she baked wholegrain sourdough bread and sold it at local farmers' markets. Moraff has appeared in two movies: an anti-war film Button, Button (aired on CBS) and Enlightened Society (Vajradhatu Films).

Moraff died in her home in Danville, Vermont in April 2024.

== Works ==
=== Poetry ===
- Deadly Nightshade. Coffee House Press. 1989. ISBN 978-0-918273-61-1. (Morning Coffee Chapbook)
- You've got me. Longhouse. 1987. (Scout)
- Contra La Violencia. White Pine Press. 1985. ISBN 978-0-934834-56-8.
- Telephone company repairman poems. Toothpaste Press. 1983. ISBN 978-0-915124-75-6.
- Mister. Penny poems. 1959.
- Learning to Move. Potes & Poets Press. 1982. ISBN 978-0-937013-11-3.
- Open to the Other
- Potterwoman. Pentagram. 1984.
- Potterwoman Book 2. Longhouse. 1993.
- A Single Branch, A Single Flower Enough. Tel-let. 1993.
- Lotus Petals
- Ahh, Shadowplay, 1992

=== Anthologies ===
- Leroi Jones, ed. (1962). Four Young Lady Poets: Carol Bergé, Barbara Moraff, Rochelle Owens, Diane Wakoski. Totem-Corinth Press.
- Richard Peabody (1997). A Different beat: writings by women of the Beat generation. Serpent's Tail. ISBN 1-85242-431-1.
- Lawrence Ferlinghetti, ed. (c. 1960). Beatitude Anthology. San Francisco: City Lights Books.
