= Warehousing Act =

Commercial law of the United States

The Warehousing Act of 1846, was a commercial law that allowed merchants to warehouse their imports into the United States and thus delay tariff payments on those goods until a buyer was found. It established the bonded warehousing system at American ports and spurred the influx of commerce, particularly in New York City.

The bonded warehousing system was advocated by Adam Smith and permits merchants to increase their shipping capabilities as they no longer had to carry large sums of cash on hand to make the revenue payments. Prior to the system, merchants often had to sell their cargo on short notice and at reduced prices to obtain the necessary funds for assessed duties.

The American Warehousing Act had as a direct model a similar system proposed in England by Sir Robert Walpole a century earlier and implemented in both London and Havana with much success in the early 19th century. Walpole's recommendation was rejected at the time but adopted into British law in 1803.

== Adoption and implementation in the United States ==
United States Treasury Secretary Robert Walker proposed the establishment of a bonded warehousing system based on the one employed by Britain in his 1846 report to Congress. The bill was adopted following the Walker Tariff of 1846 and implemented in 1847. During the Zachary Taylor administration members of the Whig party predicted the system would amount to failure and urged its repeal. The system quickly flourished however and produced a rapid increase in reexportation commerce through American ports. The impact was particularly strong in New York City where an established warehousing industry facilitated its rapid implementation.

== Judicial interpretation ==
The Supreme Court of the United States held in the case of Tremblett v. Adams that the law only applied to ports of entry, and not ports of delivery, until regulations were adapted by the Secretary of the Treasury.

== Repeal and restoration ==
The American Warehousing Act remained in place until 1861 when the original version of the Morrill Tariff attempted to repeal it. An amendment to the Morrill Tariff in the Senate, adopted shortly before it passed, briefly preserved the Warehousing Act. The system was repealed when Congress returned only a few months later. A modernized version of the bonded warehousing system using the same principles was later restored by Congress at a later date. The current version, which operates on the same principles, was adopted in the Smoot Hawley Tariff of 1930 and remains in effect today.

== See also ==
- United States trade policy
