= Justin S. Morrill =

American politician (1810–1898)

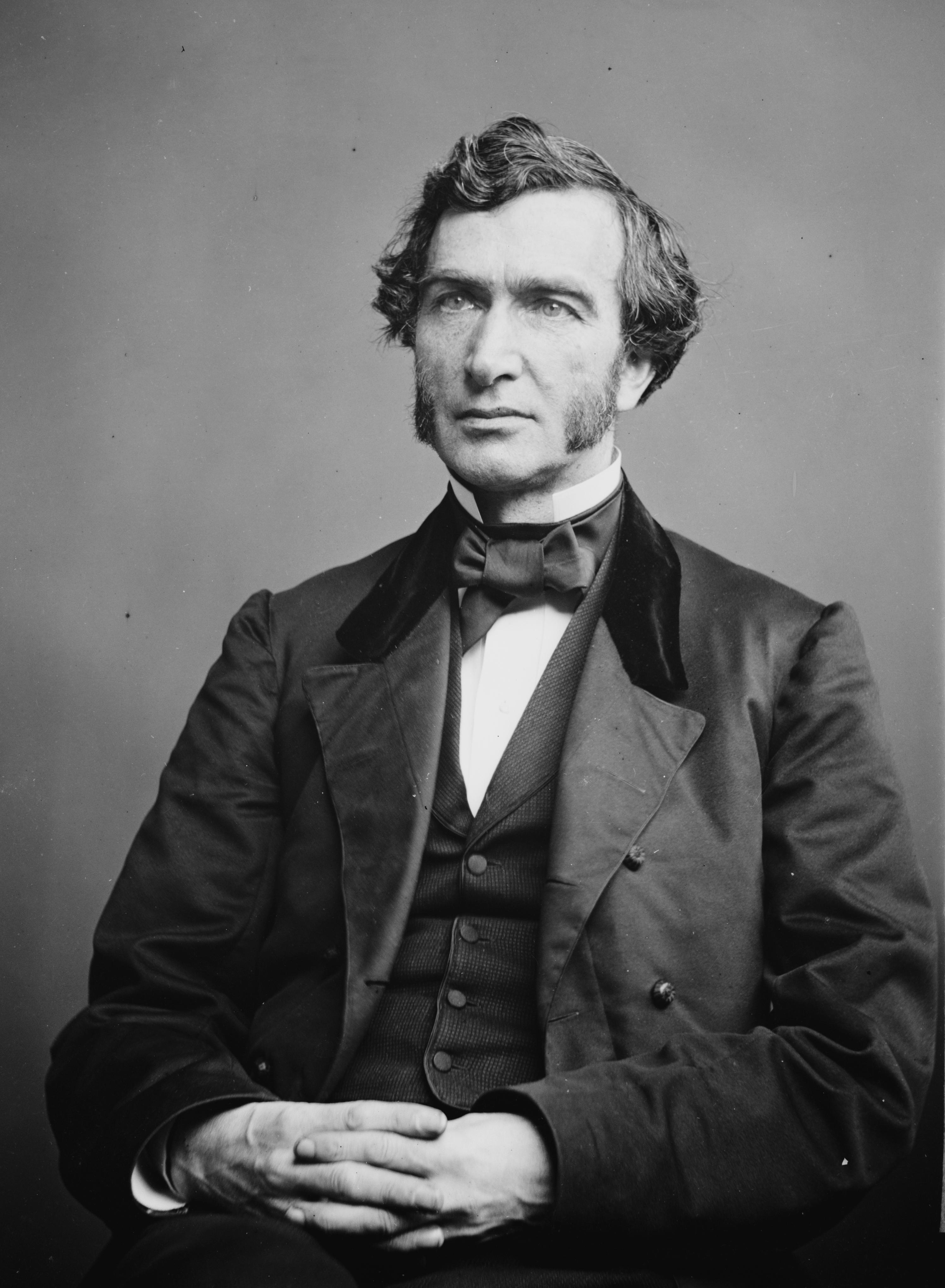
- Morrill, 1855–65

United States Senator from Vermont
- In office March 4, 1867 – December 28, 1898
- Preceded by: Luke P. Poland
- Succeeded by: Jonathan Ross

Chairman of the House Republican Conference
- In office March 4, 1863 – March 3, 1867
- Speaker: Schuyler Colfax
- Preceded by: Office established
- Succeeded by: Robert C. Schenck and Nathaniel P. Banks (1869)

Chairman of the House Committee on Ways and Means
- In office March 4, 1865 – March 3, 1867
- Preceded by: Thaddeus Stevens
- Succeeded by: Robert C. Schenck

Member of the U.S. House of Representatives from Vermont's 2nd district
- In office March 4, 1855 – March 3, 1867
- Preceded by: Andrew Tracy
- Succeeded by: Luke P. Poland

Personal details
- Born: April 14, 1810 Strafford, Vermont, US
- Died: December 28, 1898 (aged 88) Washington, D.C., US
- Party: Whig (before 1855); Republican (from 1855)
- Spouse: Ruth Barrell Swan (1821–1898)
- Children: 2
- Profession: Businessman

Justin Smith Morrill (April 14, 1810 – December 28, 1898) was an American politician and entrepreneur who represented Vermont in the United States House of Representatives (1855–1867) and United States Senate (1867–1898). He is most widely remembered for Morrill Land-Grant Acts that provided federal funding for establishing many of the United States' public colleges and universities following a movement led by Jonathan Baldwin Turner. He is also remembered for the Morrill Tariff. Originally a Whig, after that party became defunct Morrill was one of the founders of the Republican Party.

A native of Strafford, Vermont, Morrill was educated in the schools of Strafford, Thetford Academy and Randolph Academy. He worked as a merchant's clerk in Maine and Vermont, then embarked on a business career. In partnership with Jedediah H. Harris, Morrill owned and operated several stores in towns throughout Vermont. The success of his stores enabled Morrill to invest profitably in a farm, banks, railroads, and real estate.

Morrill was active in politics as a Whig, and was elected to Congress in 1854. The party became defunct soon afterwards, and Morrill was a founder of the new Republican Party. He won reelection to the U.S. House every two years from 1856 to 1864, and he served from March 1857 to March 1867. During his House service, Morrill served as chairman of the Ways and Means Committee and the House Republican Conference.

In 1866, Morrill was elected to the U.S. Senate, and he served from March 1867 until his death. During his Senate career, Morrill was chairman of the Senate Finance Committee and the Joint Committee on Public Buildings. Morrill died in Washington, D.C., on December 28, 1898. He was buried at Strafford Cemetery.

== Early life ==
Morrill was born in Strafford, Vermont, on April 14, 1810, the son of Mary Hunt (Proctor) Morrill and Nathaniel Morrill, a farmer, blacksmith, and militia leader who attained the rank of colonel. Morrill attended the common schools of Strafford, Thetford Academy and Randolph Academy. He then trained for a business career by working as a merchant's clerk in Strafford and Portland, Maine. He then was a merchant in Strafford, and the partnership in which he participated with Judge Jedediah H. Harris grew to own and operate four stores throughout the state. Morrill also served in local offices including Town Auditor and Justice of the Peace.

One of Judge Harris's daughters married Portus Baxter, who also served in Congress. Baxter and Morrill became close friends as a result of the connection to Judge Harris, with Morrill referring to Baxter as "one of nature's noblemen" and Baxter consciously patterning his business and political career on Morrill's.

Morrill invested in several successful ventures, including banks, railroads, and real estate. By the late 1840s he was financially secure enough to retire, and he became a gentleman farmer.

In addition to farming, Morrill became active in the Whig Party, including serving as chairman of the Orange County Whig Committee, a member of the Vermont State Whig Committee, and a Delegate to the 1852 Whig National Convention.

== Congressional career ==
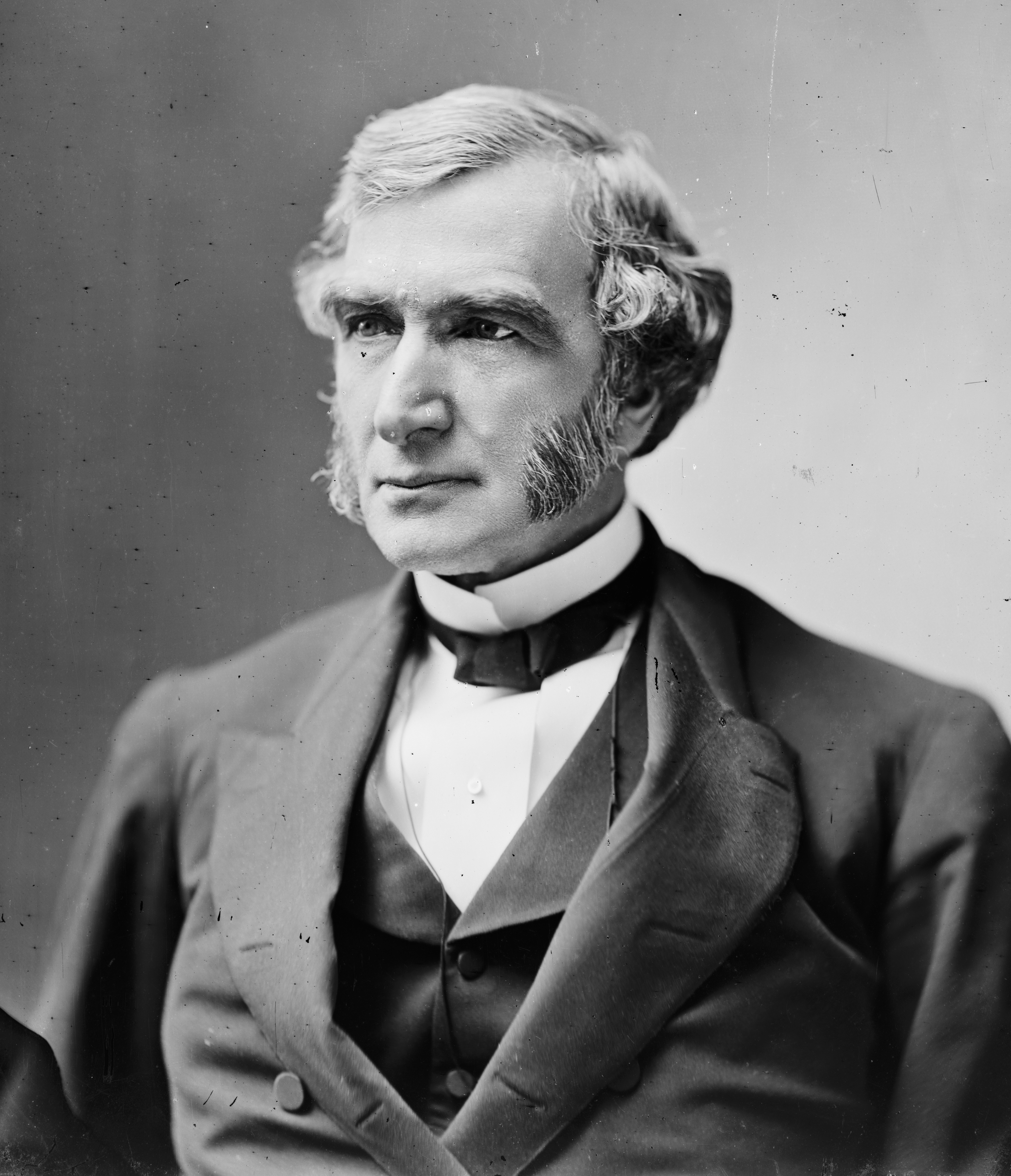
Justin Smith Morrill (pictured between 1865 and 1880)

In 1854 Morrill was elected to the Thirty-fourth Congress as a Whig. He was a founder of the Republican Party, and won reelection five times as a Republican, serving from March 4, 1855, to March 3, 1867. He served as chairman of the Committee on Ways and Means in the Thirty-ninth Congress. He also served on the Joint Committee on Reconstruction, which drafted the Fourteenth Amendment to the United States Constitution.

In 1866 Morrill was elected to the U.S. Senate as a Union Republican. He was reelected as a Republican in 1872, 1878, 1884, 1890, and 1896, and served from March 4, 1867, until his death, almost thirty-one years. He served as chairman of the Committee on Public Buildings and Grounds (Forty-first through Forty-fourth Congresses) where he played a vital role in obtaining the current Library of Congress main building through his work on the Joint Select Committee on Additional Accommodations for the Library. He also served as chairman of the Committee on Finance (Forty-fifth, Forty-seventh through Fifty-second, Fifty-fourth and Fifty-fifth Congresses). In addition, Morrill was a regent of the Smithsonian Institution from 1883 to 1898 and a trustee of the University of Vermont from 1865 to 1898.

== Legislation ==
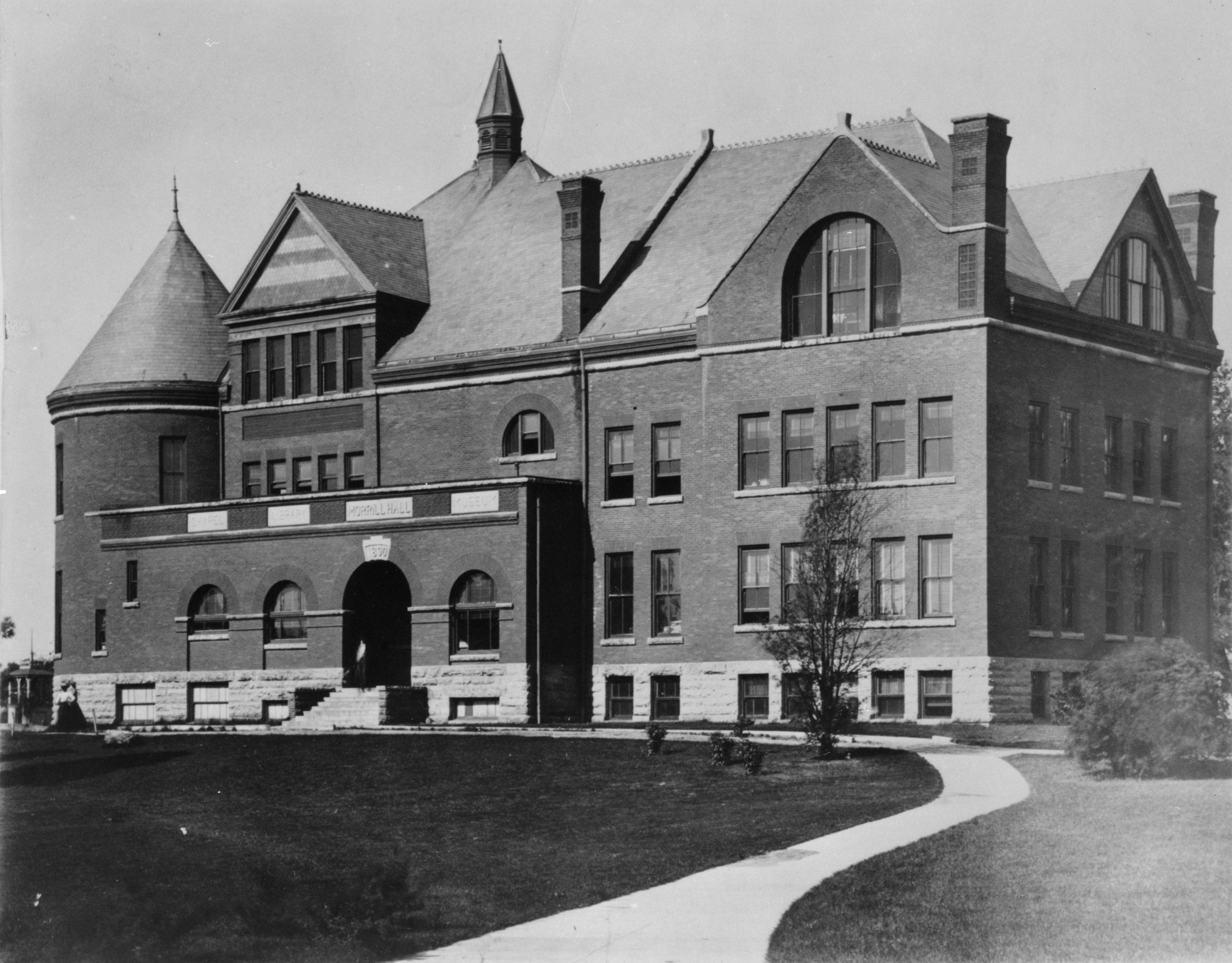
Morrill Hall at Iowa State University, one of several Morrill Halls at colleges created by the Morrill Act

The Morrill Tariff of 1861 was a protective tariff law adopted on March 2, 1861. Passed after anti-tariff southerners had left Congress during the process of secession, Morrill designed it with the advice of Pennsylvania economist Henry C. Carey. It was one of the last acts signed into law by James Buchanan, and replaced the Tariff of 1857. Additional tariffs Morrill sponsored were passed to raise revenue during the American Civil War.

Morrill is best known for sponsoring the Morrill Act, also known as the Land Grant College Act. This act was signed into law by Abraham Lincoln in 1862, and established federal funding for higher education in every state of the country. In his own words:

This bill proposes to establish at least one college in every State upon a sure and perpetual foundation, accessible to all, but especially to the sons of toil, where all of needful science for the practical avocations of life shall be taught, where neither the higher graces of classical studies nor that military drill our country now so greatly appreciates will be entirely ignored, and where agriculture, the foundation of all present and future prosperity, may look for troops of earnest friends, studying its familiar and recondite economies, and at last elevating it to that higher level where it may fearlessly invoke comparison with the most advanced standards of the world.

— Justin Smith Morrill, 1862, as quoted by William Belmont Parker, The Life and Public Services of Justin Smith Morrill

He also authored the Morrill Anti-Bigamy Act of 1862, which targeted the Church of Jesus Christ of Latter-day Saints, based on the then-existing practice of plural marriage (polygamy). It imposed a five-hundred dollar fine and up to five years imprisonment for the crime of polygamy. On January 6, 1879, in Reynolds v. United States the Supreme Court, upheld the Anti-Bigamy Act's ban on plural marriage.

While serving in the U.S. House, Morrill secured passage of legislation to establish the National Statuary Hall Collection inside the United States Capitol. Under the provisions of this 1864 law, each state is permitted to provide two statues of noteworthy citizens for display inside the Capitol.

A second Land Grant College Act in 1890 targeted the former Confederate states and led to the creation of several historically black colleges and universities.

The Land Grant College Acts ultimately led to the founding of 106 colleges including many state universities, polytechnic colleges, and agricultural and mechanical colleges.

== Personal life ==
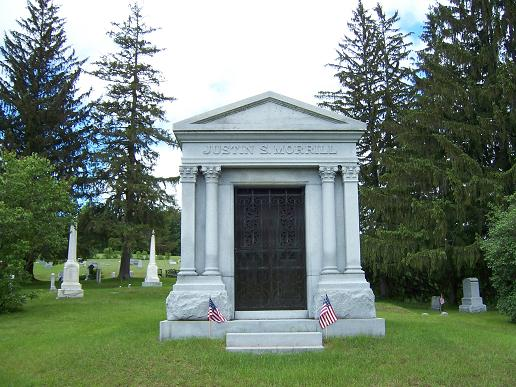
Mausoleum of Senator Justin Smith Morrill in Strafford, Vermont

In 1851, Morrill married Ruth Barrell Swan (1822–1898) of Easton, Massachusetts. They had two children. Justin Harris Morrill (1853–1855) died in childhood. James Swan Morrill (1857–1910) graduated from the University of Vermont in 1880 and Columbian College Law School in 1882. He was a lawyer and farmer and served in a variety of offices including as a member of the Vermont House of Representatives. He wrote Self-Consciousness of Noted Persons, published in 1886.

Morrill died in Washington, D.C. on December 28, 1898. He was buried at Strafford Cemetery.

At the time of Morrill's death his 43 years and 299 days of continuous Congressional service was the longest in U.S. history. He has since been surpassed, but still ranks 31st as of the end of the 118th Congress (December 2024).

== Legacy ==
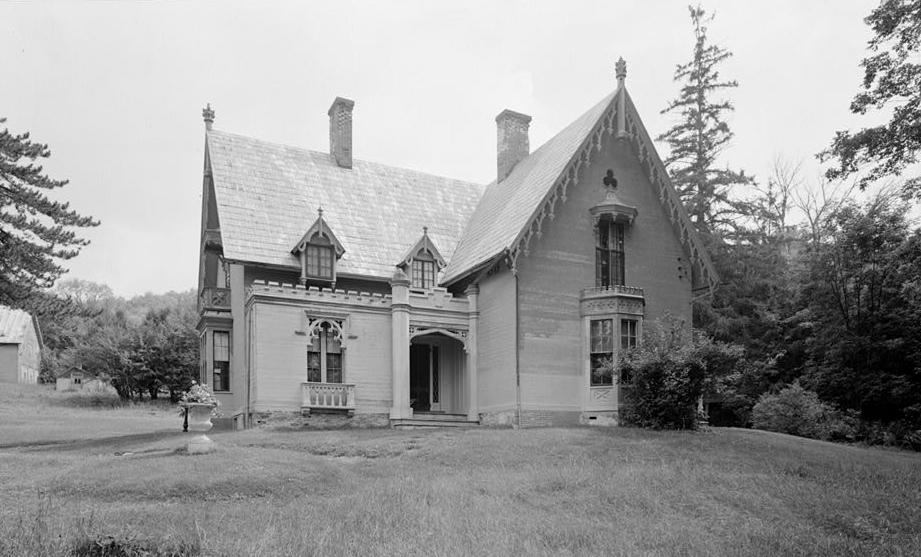
The Morrill Homestead in Strafford, Vermont

The Justin Smith Morrill Homestead in Strafford is a National Historic Landmark.

Many colleges established under the Morrill Act created a 'Morrill Hall' in his honor.

Morrill was initiated into the Delta Upsilon fraternity as an honorary member in 1864. He received honorary degrees from the University of Vermont, University of Pennsylvania, Dartmouth College, and many other institutions.

Justin Morrill College at Michigan State University was named for him.

In 1962, the U.S. Postal Service issued a 4 cent postage stamp to celebrate the centennial of the Morrill Land-Grant College Act. In 1999, the Postal Service issued a 55 cent Great Americans series postage stamp of Morrill to honor his role in establishing the land grant colleges.

In 1967 Ohio State University opened two residence halls on its campus. Named for Morrill and Abraham Lincoln, they are also known as The Towers. They are the tallest buildings on the OSU campus, and among the tallest in Columbus Ohio.

== See also ==
- List of members of the United States Congress who died in office (1790–1899)

U.S. House of Representatives
Preceded by Andrew Tracy	Member of the U.S. House of Representatives from Vermont's 2nd congressional district March 4, 1855 – March 3, 1867	Succeeded by Luke P. Poland
U.S. Senate
Preceded by Luke P. Poland	U.S. senator (Class 3) from Vermont; March 4, 1867 – December 28, 1898; Served alongside: George F. Edmunds and Redfield Proctor	Succeeded by Jonathan Ross
Preceded by John Sherman	Chairman of the U.S. Senate Committee on Finance; 1877–1879	Succeeded by Thomas F. Bayard
Preceded by Thomas F. Bayard	Chairman of the U.S. Senate Committee on Finance; 1881–1893	Succeeded by Daniel Voorhees
Preceded by Daniel Voorhees	Chairman of the U.S. Senate Committee on Finance; 1895–1898	Succeeded by Nelson Aldrich
