= Walker tariff =

Historical United States tariff reduction

Walker Tariff
- Long title: An Act reducing the Duty on Imports, and for other Purposes
- Nicknames: Tariff of 1846
- Enacted by: the 29th United States Congress
- Effective: December 1, 1846

Citations
- Statutes at Large: 9 Stat. 42

Codification
- Acts amended: Tariff of 1842
- Acts repealed: Tariff of 1857

Legislative history
- Introduced in the House as H.R. 368 by James Iver McKay on April 14, 1846; Committee consideration by House Committee on Ways and Means; Signed into law by President James K. Polk on July 29, 1846

The Walker Tariff was a set of tariff rates adopted by the United States in 1846. Enacted by the Democrats, it made substantial cuts in the high rates of the "Black Tariff" of 1842, enacted by the Whigs. It was based on a report by Secretary of the Treasury Robert J. Walker.

The Walker Tariff reduced tariff rates from 32% to 25%. Coinciding with the United Kingdom of Great Britain and Ireland's repeal of the Corn Laws, it led to an increase in trade. The tariff still remained higher than the 20% universal tariff that existed before the Tyler tariffs were imposed.

== Adoption ==
Democrat James Polk was elected President in 1844 over Henry Clay, a Whig who advocated a high tariff.

President Polk declared that reduction of the "Black Tariff" would be the first of the "four great measures" that would define his administration. He directed Walker to work out the details. In 1846, Polk delivered Walker's tariff proposal to Congress. Walker urged its adoption to increase commerce between the US and Britain. He also predicted that a reduction in tariff rates would stimulate trade, including imports. The result, asserted Walker, would be a net increase in customs revenue, despite the reduced rates.

Congress, then controlled by Democrats, acted quickly on Walker's recommendations. Southern Democrats, who had little industry in their states, were especially supportive.

The Walker Tariff produced the nation's first standardized tariff: rather than setting fixed rates for specific items on a case-by-case basis, it established general schedules into which all goods could be classified, subject to defined ad valorem rates. The bill reduced rates across the board on most major import items save luxury goods, such as tobacco and alcoholic beverages.

== Impact ==
The bill made moderate reductions in many tariff rates. As Walker had predicted, trade increased substantially, and net revenue collected also increased, from $30 million annually under the Black Tariff in 1845 to almost $45 million annually by 1850. It also improved relations with Britain that had soured over the Oregon boundary dispute.

It was passed along with a series of financial reforms proposed by Walker including the Warehousing Act of 1846. The 1846 tariff rates initiated a fourteen-year period of relative free trade by nineteenth century standards lasting until the high Morrill Tariff of 1861.

The Walker Tariff remained in effect until the Tariff of 1857, which used it as a base and reduced rates further.

The 1861 Morril Tariff raised the effective rate collected on dutiable imports by approximately 70%. Customs revenue from tariffs totaled $345 million from 1861 through 1865.

The tariff act of 1842 had a significant impact on railroad building. The duty of $17/ton of hammered bar iron and $25/ton of rolled bar iron raised costs by 50 to 80%. The Walker tariff of 1846 reduced the duty to 30% and set off a railroad building boom in the 1850s.

== See also ==
- Bibliography of James K. Polk
