= Tariff of 1857 =

Historical United States tariff reduction

- Long title: An Act reducing the Duty on Imports, and for other Purposes
- Enacted by: the 34th United States Congress
- Effective: July 1, 1857

Citations
- Statutes at Large: 11 Stat. 192

Codification
- Acts amended: Walker Tariff (1846)

Legislative history
- Signed into law by President Franklin Pierce on March 3, 1857

The Tariff of 1857 was a major tax reduction in the United States that amended the Walker Tariff of 1846 by lowering rates to between 15% and 24%.

The Tariff of 1857 was developed in response to a federal budget surplus in the mid-1850s. The first version was authored by Representative Lewis D. Campbell and contained provisions only for an increased number of goods that could be imported without duties being leveed. After protests primarily from agricultural interests, Senator Robert Mercer Taliaferro Hunter introduced a new version of the bill, which in addition to removing duties from some imports decreased all tariffs by between 20% and 25%. The bill was signed into law on 3 March 1857.

Support for the bill did not come from any political or geographic bloc as a whole, but was driven primarily by local economic interests. For example, Northeastern wool processors supported the bill, as they had been suffering under high duties on their goods, but Northern manufacturers advocated high protectionist tariffs. Southern agricultural interests generally supported the lower tariffs, as they had long felt that the tariffs advocated by Northern industry led to unfairly high costs for the goods that the farmers consumed.

According to the historian Kenneth M. Stampp, the bill "was possible because it did not represent a victory of one section over the other; nor did it produce a clear division between parties. Its supporters included Democrats, Republicans, and Americans; representatives of northern merchants, manufacturers, and railroad interests; and spokesmen for southern farmers and planters. Opposition came largely from two economic groups: the iron manufacturers of Pennsylvania and the wool growers of New England and the West." The Republican Party was divided on the tariffs.

When the Panic of 1857 struck later that year, protectionists, led by the economist Henry C. Carey, blamed the downturn on the new tariff.

The tariff reductions lasted only a few years, as the highly-protectionist Morrill Tariff was signed into law in March 1861.
