= Strafford, Vermont =

- Town
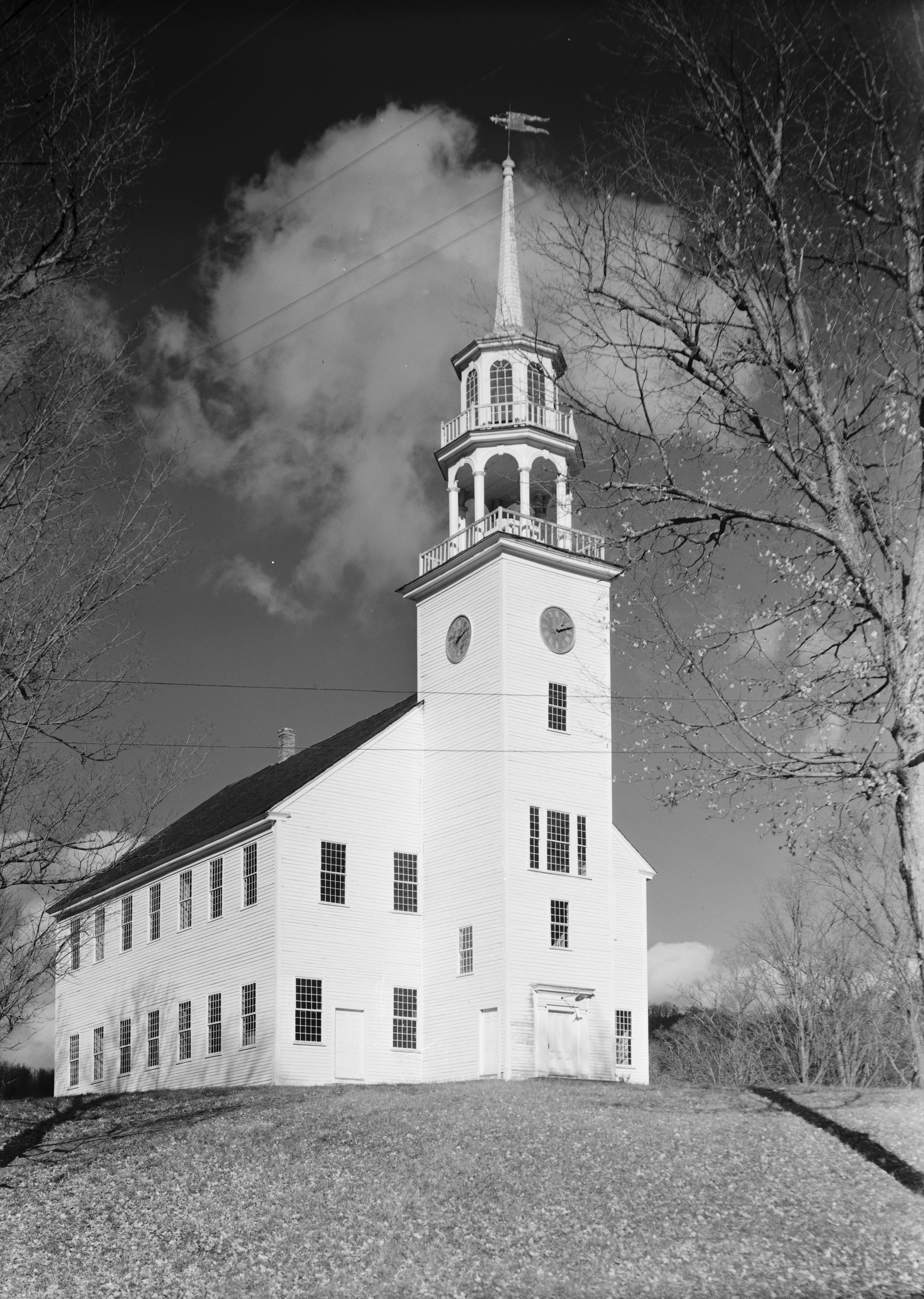
- Strafford Town House (1799)

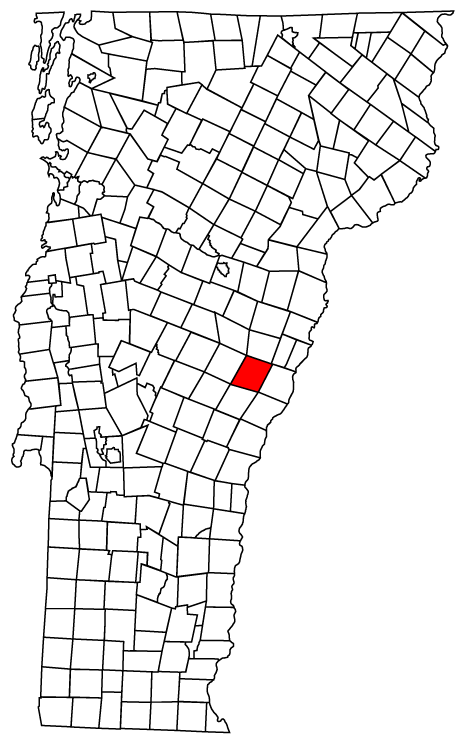
- Located in Orange County, Vermont
- Coordinates: 43°52′12″N 72°22′38″W
- Country: United States
- State: Vermont
- County: Orange
- Chartered: 1761
- Communities: Strafford; South Strafford

Area
  - Total: 44.3 sq mi (114.8 km^{2})
  - Land: 44.2 sq mi (114.5 km^{2})
  - Water: 0.12 sq mi (0.3 km^{2})
- Elevation: 1,312 ft (400 m)

Population (2020)
  - Total: 1,094
  - Density: 25/sq mi (9.6/km^{2})
  - Households: 462
  - Families: 325
- Time zone: UTC-5 (EST)
  - Summer (DST): UTC-4 (EDT)
- ZIP Code: 05072 (Strafford); 05070 (South Strafford); 05075 (Thetford Center); 05065 (Sharon)
- Area code: 802
- FIPS code: 50-70675
- GNIS feature ID: 1462220
- Website: Strafford Official Town Website

Strafford is a town in Orange County, Vermont, United States. The population was 1,094 at the 2020 census. The town of Strafford was created on August 12, 1761, by way of a royal charter which King George III of Great Britain issued to Governor Benning Wentworth of New Hampshire. The town was named after the Earl of Strafford. Its town house is one of the most famous in Vermont, sitting atop a hill at the end of the historic town common.

Strafford was one of thirteen Vermont towns isolated by flooding caused by Hurricane Irene in 2011.

== Geography ==
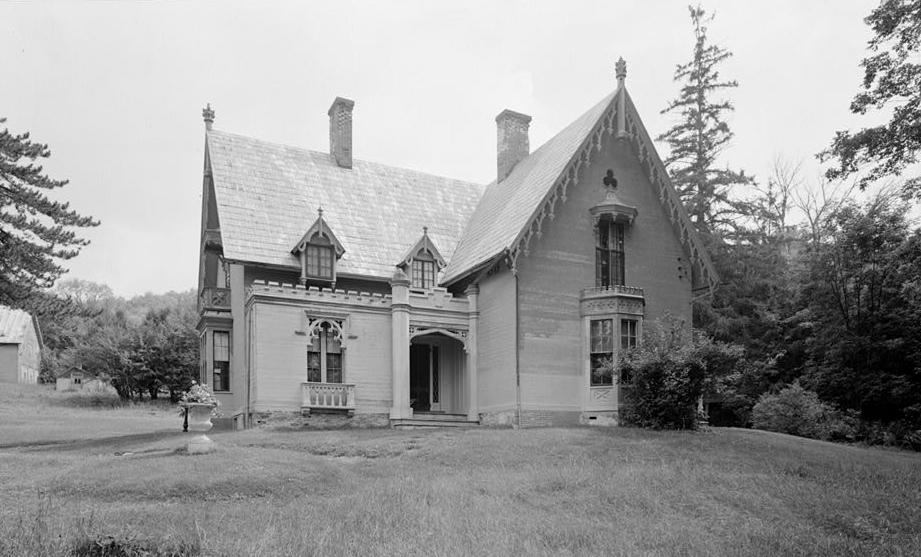
Justin Smith Morrill house

According to the United States Census Bureau, the town has a total area of 44.3 square miles (114.8 km^{2}), of which 44.2 square miles (114.5 km^{2}) is land and 0.1 square mile (0.3 km^{2}) (0.25%) is water. The West Branch of the Ompompanoosuc River flows through the town.

== Demographics ==
Historical population
Census	Pop.	Note	%±
1790	845		—
1800	1,642		94.3%
1810	1,805		9.9%
1820	1,921		6.4%
1830	1,935		0.7%
1840	1,761		−9.0%
1850	1,540		−12.5%
1860	1,506		−2.2%
1870	1,290		−14.3%
1880	1,181		−8.4%
1890	932		−21.1%
1900	1,000		7.3%
1910	776		−22.4%
1920	601		−22.6%
1930	615		2.3%
1940	598		−2.8%
1950	680		13.7%
1960	548		−19.4%
1970	536		−2.2%
1980	731		36.4%
1990	902		23.4%
2000	1,045		15.9%
2010	1,098		5.1%
2020	1,094		−0.4%
U.S. Decennial Census

As of the census of 2000, there were 1,045 people, 420 households, and 296 families residing in the town. The population density was 23.6 people per square mile (9.1/km^{2}). There were 542 housing units at an average density of 12.3 per square mile (4.7/km^{2}). The racial makeup of the town was 98.47% White, 0.19% African American, 0.29% Asian, 0.10% from other races, and 0.96% from two or more races. Hispanic or Latino of any race were 0.48% of the population.

There were 420 households, out of which 35.0% had children under the age of 18 living with them, 59.0% were married couples living together, 7.6% had a female householder with no husband present, and 29.3% were non-families. 25.2% of all households were made up of individuals, and 6.2% had someone living alone who was 65 years of age or older. The average household size was 2.49 and the average family size was 2.97.

In the town, the population was spread out, with 27.3% under the age of 18, 3.8% from 18 to 24, 27.9% from 25 to 44, 29.0% from 45 to 64, and 12.0% who were 65 years of age or older. The median age was 41 years. For every 100 females, there were 100.6 males. For every 100 females age 18 and over, there were 95.9 males.

The median income for a household in the town was $46,711, and the median income for a family was $52,596. Males had a median income of $31,481 versus $24,808 for females. The per capita income for the town was $22,267. About 3.6% of families and 7.9% of the population were below the poverty line, including 12.2% of those under age 18 and 13.9% of those age 65 or over.

Justin Smith Morrill, US Representative and Senator, known as the chief sponsor and author of the Land Grant College Acts, was born in Strafford. His Gothic Revival Homestead is one of the Vermont State-Owned Historic Sites.

== Notable people ==
- Noah Kahan, American singer-songwriter
- Jedediah Hyde Baxter, Surgeon General of the United States Army
- Edmund "Tad" Coffin, saddle maker and Olympic equestrian
- William Sloane Coffin, clergyman and activist
- Denny Emerson, equestrian
- Doc Hazelton, major league baseball player and college coach
- Barbara Moraff, American poet of the Beat generation
- Justin Smith Morrill, US congressman and senator
