= List of top exporting countries by category =

This article provides a comprehensive list of the top exporting countries by category. It includes information on the top exporting countries for various product categories and shows the market leaders in different export markets. The individual product categories are based on a bundling of products related in type or production method (Harmonized System).

== Top exporting countries by product category ==
The data is sourced from International Trade Centre. All data refer to the year 2022.

| Product category | Global exports (millions USD) | Rank | Country | Exports (millions USD) | Market share |
|---|---|---|---|---|---|
| All products | 24,486,780 | 1 | China | 3,593,601 | 14.7% |
| All products | 24,486,780 | 2 | United States | 2,062,937 | 8.4% |
| All products | 24,486,780 | 3 | Germany | 1,658,443 | 6.8% |
| All products | 24,486,780 | 4 | Netherlands | 770,307 | 3.1% |
| All products | 24,486,780 | 5 | Japan | 752,072 | 3.1% |
| Live animals | 22,589 | 1 | France | 2,537 | 11.2% |
| Live animals | 22,589 | 2 | Netherlands | 1,999 | 8.8% |
| Live animals | 22,589 | 3 | Canada | 1,963 | 8.7% |
| Live animals | 22,589 | 4 | Germany | 1,359 | 6.0% |
| Live animals | 22,589 | 5 | Denmark | 1,217 | 5.4% |
| Meat and edible meat offal | 163,731 | 1 | Brazil | 23,975 | 14.6% |
| Meat and edible meat offal | 163,731 | 2 | United States | 23,344 | 14.3% |
| Meat and edible meat offal | 163,731 | 3 | Australia | 12,012 | 7.3% |
| Meat and edible meat offal | 163,731 | 4 | Netherlands | 11,539 | 7.0% |
| Meat and edible meat offal | 163,731 | 5 | Spain | 9,911 | 6.1% |
| Fish and crustaceans, molluscs and other aquatic invertebrates | 146,777 | 1 | Norway | 15,154 | 10.3% |
| Fish and crustaceans, molluscs and other aquatic invertebrates | 146,777 | 2 | China | 12,201 | 8.3% |
| Fish and crustaceans, molluscs and other aquatic invertebrates | 146,777 | 3 | Ecuador | 8,454 | 5.8% |
| Fish and crustaceans, molluscs and other aquatic invertebrates | 146,777 | 4 | Russia | 7,839 | 5.3% |
| Fish and crustaceans, molluscs and other aquatic invertebrates | 146,777 | 5 | Vietnam | 7,678 | 5.2% |
| Dairy produce; birds' eggs; natural honey; edible products of animal origin, not elsewhere specified or included | 109,621 | 1 | New Zealand | 13,360 | 12.2% |
| Dairy produce; birds' eggs; natural honey; edible products of animal origin, not elsewhere specified or included | 109,621 | 2 | Netherlands | 12,711 | 11.6% |
| Dairy produce; birds' eggs; natural honey; edible products of animal origin, not elsewhere specified or included | 109,621 | 3 | Germany | 12,492 | 11.4% |
| Dairy produce; birds' eggs; natural honey; edible products of animal origin, not elsewhere specified or included | 109,621 | 4 | France | 7,982 | 7.3% |
| Dairy produce; birds' eggs; natural honey; edible products of animal origin, not elsewhere specified or included | 109,621 | 5 | United States | 7,871 | 7.2% |
| Products of animal origin, not elsewhere specified or included | 11,903 | 1 | China | 2,033 | 17.1% |
| Products of animal origin, not elsewhere specified or included | 11,903 | 2 | United States | 1,346 | 11.3% |
| Products of animal origin, not elsewhere specified or included | 11,903 | 3 | Germany | 1,010 | 8.5% |
| Products of animal origin, not elsewhere specified or included | 11,903 | 4 | Netherlands | 787 | 6.6% |
| Products of animal origin, not elsewhere specified or included | 11,903 | 5 | Brazil | 699 | 5.9% |
| Live trees and other plants; bulbs, roots and the like; cut flowers and ornamental foliage | 23,895 | 1 | Netherlands | 12,125 | 50.7% |
| Live trees and other plants; bulbs, roots and the like; cut flowers and ornamental foliage | 23,895 | 2 | Italy | 1,355 | 5.7% |
| Live trees and other plants; bulbs, roots and the like; cut flowers and ornamental foliage | 23,895 | 3 | Ecuador | 1,045 | 4.4% |
| Live trees and other plants; bulbs, roots and the like; cut flowers and ornamental foliage | 23,895 | 4 | Germany | 1,012 | 4.2% |
| Live trees and other plants; bulbs, roots and the like; cut flowers and ornamental foliage | 23,895 | 5 | Canada | 740 | 3.1% |
| Edible vegetables and certain roots and tubers | 83,055 | 1 | China | 10,167 | 12.2% |
| Edible vegetables and certain roots and tubers | 83,055 | 2 | Mexico | 9,079 | 10.9% |
| Edible vegetables and certain roots and tubers | 83,055 | 3 | Netherlands | 8,202 | 9.9% |
| Edible vegetables and certain roots and tubers | 83,055 | 4 | Spain | 8,164 | 9.8% |
| Edible vegetables and certain roots and tubers | 83,055 | 5 | Canada | 6,156 | 7.4% |
| Edible fruit and nuts; peel of citrus fruit or melons | 136,183 | 1 | United States | 14,756 | 10.8% |
| Edible fruit and nuts; peel of citrus fruit or melons | 136,183 | 2 | Spain | 10,190 | 7.5% |
| Edible fruit and nuts; peel of citrus fruit or melons | 136,183 | 3 | Chile | 9,216 | 6.8% |
| Edible fruit and nuts; peel of citrus fruit or melons | 136,183 | 4 | Netherlands | 7,391 | 5.9% |
| Edible fruit and nuts; peel of citrus fruit or melons | 136,183 | 5 | Thailand | 5,662 | 5.4% |
| Coffee, tea, maté and spices | 67,123 | 1 | Brazil | 9,003 | 13.4% |
| Coffee, tea, maté and spices | 67,123 | 2 | Vietnam | 4,695 | 7.0% |
| Coffee, tea, maté and spices | 67,123 | 3 | Colombia | 4,107 | 6.1% |
| Coffee, tea, maté and spices | 67,123 | 4 | India | 4,018 | 6.0% |
| Coffee, tea, maté and spices | 67,123 | 5 | Germany | 3,967 | 5.9% |
| Cereals | 174,886 | 1 | United States | 31,579 | 18.1% |
| Cereals | 174,886 | 2 | India | 14,088 | 8.1% |
| Cereals | 174,886 | 3 | Brazil | 13,897 | 7.9% |
| Cereals | 174,886 | 4 | Australia | 13,795 | 7.9% |
| Cereals | 174,886 | 5 | Argentina | 13,111 | 7.5% |
| Products of the milling industry; malt; starches; inulin; wheat gluten | 27,258 | 1 | Germany | 2,224 | 8.2% |
| Products of the milling industry; malt; starches; inulin; wheat gluten | 27,258 | 2 | Thailand | 2,027 | 7.4% |
| Products of the milling industry; malt; starches; inulin; wheat gluten | 27,258 | 3 | Turkey | 1,902 | 7.0% |
| Products of the milling industry; malt; starches; inulin; wheat gluten | 27,258 | 4 | Belgium | 1,645 | 6.0% |
| Products of the milling industry; malt; starches; inulin; wheat gluten | 27,258 | 5 | Canada | 1,421 | 5.2% |
| Oil seeds and oleaginous fruits; miscellaneous grains, seeds and fruit; industrial or medicinal plants; straw and fodder | 151,762 | 1 | Brazil | 47,171 | 31.1% |
| Oil seeds and oleaginous fruits; miscellaneous grains, seeds and fruit; industrial or medicinal plants; straw and fodder | 151,762 | 2 | United States | 40,195 | 26.5% |
| Oil seeds and oleaginous fruits; miscellaneous grains, seeds and fruit; industrial or medicinal plants; straw and fodder | 151,762 | 3 | Canada | 8,147 | 5.4% |
| Oil seeds and oleaginous fruits; miscellaneous grains, seeds and fruit; industrial or medicinal plants; straw and fodder | 151,762 | 4 | Australia | 6,070 | 4.0% |
| Oil seeds and oleaginous fruits; miscellaneous grains, seeds and fruit; industrial or medicinal plants; straw and fodder | 151,762 | 5 | Netherlands | 4,151 | 2.7% |
| Lac; gums, resins and other vegetable saps and extracts | 11,095 | 1 | China | 2,766 | 24.9% |
| Lac; gums, resins and other vegetable saps and extracts | 11,095 | 2 | India | 1,087 | 9.8% |
| Lac; gums, resins and other vegetable saps and extracts | 11,095 | 3 | Spain | 935 | 8.4% |
| Lac; gums, resins and other vegetable saps and extracts | 11,095 | 4 | France | 762 | 6.9% |
| Lac; gums, resins and other vegetable saps and extracts | 11,095 | 5 | United States | 694 | 6.3% |
| Vegetable plaiting materials; vegetable products not elsewhere specified or included | 1,647 | 1 | Indonesia | 496 | 30.1% |
| Vegetable plaiting materials; vegetable products not elsewhere specified or included | 1,647 | 2 | China | 262 | 15.9% |
| Vegetable plaiting materials; vegetable products not elsewhere specified or included | 1,647 | 3 | Malaysia | 128 | 7.7% |
| Vegetable plaiting materials; vegetable products not elsewhere specified or included | 1,647 | 4 | Mexico | 72 | 4.4% |
| Vegetable plaiting materials; vegetable products not elsewhere specified or included | 1,647 | 5 | Netherlands | 58 | 3.5% |
| Animal, vegetable or microbial fats and oils and their cleavage products; prepared edible fats; animal or vegetable waxes | 172,468 | 1 | Indonesia | 35,204 | 20.4% |
| Animal, vegetable or microbial fats and oils and their cleavage products; prepared edible fats; animal or vegetable waxes | 172,468 | 2 | Malaysia | 23,665 | 13.7% |
| Animal, vegetable or microbial fats and oils and their cleavage products; prepared edible fats; animal or vegetable waxes | 172,468 | 3 | Netherlands | 8,399 | 4.9% |
| Animal, vegetable or microbial fats and oils and their cleavage products; prepared edible fats; animal or vegetable waxes | 172,468 | 4 | Spain | 7,568 | 4.4% |
| Animal, vegetable or microbial fats and oils and their cleavage products; prepared edible fats; animal or vegetable waxes | 172,468 | 5 | Canada | 6,305 | 3.7% |
| Preparations of meat, of fish, of crustaceans, molluscs or other aquatic invertebrates, or of insects | 58,834 | 1 | China | 11,664 | 19.8% |
| Preparations of meat, of fish, of crustaceans, molluscs or other aquatic invertebrates, or of insects | 58,834 | 2 | Thailand | 6,902 | 11.7% |
| Preparations of meat, of fish, of crustaceans, molluscs or other aquatic invertebrates, or of insects | 58,834 | 3 | Vietnam | 2,890 | 4.9% |
| Preparations of meat, of fish, of crustaceans, molluscs or other aquatic invertebrates, or of insects | 58,834 | 4 | Poland | 2,804 | 4.8% |
| Preparations of meat, of fish, of crustaceans, molluscs or other aquatic invertebrates, or of insects | 58,834 | 5 | Germany | 2,738 | 4.7% |
| Sugars and sugar confectionery | 56,614 | 1 | Brazil | 11,240 | 19.9% |
| Sugars and sugar confectionery | 56,614 | 2 | India | 6,327 | 11.2% |
| Sugars and sugar confectionery | 56,614 | 3 | Thailand | 3,733 | 6.6% |
| Sugars and sugar confectionery | 56,614 | 4 | Germany | 3,479 | 6.1% |
| Sugars and sugar confectionery | 56,614 | 5 | China | 2,565 | 4.5% |
| Cocoa and cocoa preparations | 54,399 | 1 | Germany | 6,554 | 12.0% |
| Cocoa and cocoa preparations | 54,399 | 2 | Netherlands | 5,303 | 9.7% |
| Cocoa and cocoa preparations | 54,399 | 3 | Ivory Coast | 4,959 | 9.1% |
| Cocoa and cocoa preparations | 54,399 | 4 | Belgium | 4,081 | 7.5% |
| Cocoa and cocoa preparations | 54,399 | 5 | Italy | 2,756 | 5.1% |
| Preparations of cereals, flour, starch or milk; pastrycooks' products | 96,869 | 1 | Germany | 8,842 | 9.1% |
| Preparations of cereals, flour, starch or milk; pastrycooks' products | 96,869 | 2 | Italy | 8,787 | 9.1% |
| Preparations of cereals, flour, starch or milk; pastrycooks' products | 96,869 | 3 | Netherlands | 7,010 | 7.2% |
| Preparations of cereals, flour, starch or milk; pastrycooks' products | 96,869 | 4 | Canada | 6,210 | 6.4% |
| Preparations of cereals, flour, starch or milk; pastrycooks' products | 96,869 | 5 | France | 6,062 | 6.3% |
| Preparations of vegetables, fruit, nuts or other parts of plants | 77,193 | 1 | China | 9,969 | 12.9% |
| Preparations of vegetables, fruit, nuts or other parts of plants | 77,193 | 2 | Netherlands | 6,626 | 8.6% |
| Preparations of vegetables, fruit, nuts or other parts of plants | 77,193 | 3 | Belgium | 5,531 | 7.2% |
| Preparations of vegetables, fruit, nuts or other parts of plants | 77,193 | 4 | Italy | 5,446 | 7.1% |
| Preparations of vegetables, fruit, nuts or other parts of plants | 77,193 | 5 | United States | 5,385 | 7.0% |
| Miscellaneous edible preparations | 100,859 | 1 | United States | 11,158 | 11.1% |
| Miscellaneous edible preparations | 100,859 | 2 | Germany | 8,679 | 8.6% |
| Miscellaneous edible preparations | 100,859 | 3 | Singapore | 7,084 | 7.0% |
| Miscellaneous edible preparations | 100,859 | 4 | Netherlands | 6,449 | 6.5% |
| Miscellaneous edible preparations | 100,859 | 5 | China | 6,450 | 6.4% |
| Beverages, spirits and vinegar | 147,630 | 1 | France | 22,144 | 15.0% |
| Beverages, spirits and vinegar | 147,630 | 2 | Italy | 13,567 | 9.2% |
| Beverages, spirits and vinegar | 147,630 | 3 | Mexico | 11,647 | 7.9% |
| Beverages, spirits and vinegar | 147,630 | 4 | United Kingdom | 11,608 | 7.9% |
| Beverages, spirits and vinegar | 147,630 | 5 | United States | 10,143 | 6.9% |
| Residues and waste from the food industries; prepared animal fodder | 105,787 | 1 | United States | 14,756 | 13.9% |
| Residues and waste from the food industries; prepared animal fodder | 105,787 | 2 | Brazil | 11,150 | 10.5% |
| Residues and waste from the food industries; prepared animal fodder | 105,787 | 3 | Argentina | 7,738 | 7.3% |
| Residues and waste from the food industries; prepared animal fodder | 105,787 | 4 | Netherlands | 6,915 | 6.5% |
| Residues and waste from the food industries; prepared animal fodder | 105,787 | 5 | Germany | 6,900 | 6.5% |
| Tobacco and manufactured tobacco substitutes; products, whether or not containing nicotine, intended for inhalation without combustion; other nicotine containing products intended for the intake of nicotine into the human body | 38,703 | 1 | Poland | 4,441 | 11.5% |
| Tobacco and manufactured tobacco substitutes; products, whether or not containing nicotine, intended for inhalation without combustion; other nicotine containing products intended for the intake of nicotine into the human body | 38,703 | 2 | Germany | 2,850 | 7.4% |
| Tobacco and manufactured tobacco substitutes; products, whether or not containing nicotine, intended for inhalation without combustion; other nicotine containing products intended for the intake of nicotine into the human body | 38,703 | 3 | Brazil | 2,452 | 6.3% |
| Tobacco and manufactured tobacco substitutes; products, whether or not containing nicotine, intended for inhalation without combustion; other nicotine containing products intended for the intake of nicotine into the human body | 38,703 | 4 | Italy | 2,327 | 6.0% |
| Tobacco and manufactured tobacco substitutes; products, whether or not containing nicotine, intended for inhalation without combustion; other nicotine containing products intended for the intake of nicotine into the human body | 38,703 | 5 | Belgium | 1,627 | 4.2% |
| Salt; sulphur; earths and stone; plastering materials, limestone and cement | 68,282 | 1 | Australia | 8,607 | 12.6% |
| Salt; sulphur; earths and stone; plastering materials, limestone and cement | 68,282 | 2 | China | 4,301 | 6.3% |
| Salt; sulphur; earths and stone; plastering materials, limestone and cement | 68,282 | 3 | Turkey | 3,820 | 5.6% |
| Salt; sulphur; earths and stone; plastering materials, limestone and cement | 68,282 | 4 | United States | 3,306 | 4.8% |
| Salt; sulphur; earths and stone; plastering materials, limestone and cement | 68,282 | 5 | United Arab Emirates | 3,299 | 4.8% |
| Ores, slag and ash | 322,211 | 1 | Australia | 99,124 | 30.8% |
| Ores, slag and ash | 322,211 | 2 | Brazil | 32,419 | 10.1% |
| Ores, slag and ash | 322,211 | 3 | Chile | 27,248 | 8.5% |
| Ores, slag and ash | 322,211 | 4 | Peru | 19,156 | 5.9% |
| Ores, slag and ash | 322,211 | 5 | South Africa | 16,296 | 5.1% |
| Mineral fuels, mineral oils and products of their distillation; bituminous substances; mineral waxes | 3,988,389 | 1 | United States | 378,564 | 9.5% |
| Mineral fuels, mineral oils and products of their distillation; bituminous substances; mineral waxes | 3,988,389 | 2 | Russia | 356,474 | 8.9% |
| Mineral fuels, mineral oils and products of their distillation; bituminous substances; mineral waxes | 3,988,389 | 3 | Saudi Arabia | 314,456 | 7.9% |
| Mineral fuels, mineral oils and products of their distillation; bituminous substances; mineral waxes | 3,988,389 | 4 | Norway | 214,237 | 5.4% |
| Mineral fuels, mineral oils and products of their distillation; bituminous substances; mineral waxes | 3,988,389 | 5 | United Arab Emirates | 213,133 | 5.3% |
| Inorganic chemicals; organic or inorganic compounds of precious metals, of rare-earth metals, of radioactive elements or of isotopes | 227,188 | 1 | China | 39,407 | 17.3% |
| Inorganic chemicals; organic or inorganic compounds of precious metals, of rare-earth metals, of radioactive elements or of isotopes | 227,188 | 2 | United States | 16,837 | 7.4% |
| Inorganic chemicals; organic or inorganic compounds of precious metals, of rare-earth metals, of radioactive elements or of isotopes | 227,188 | 3 | South Korea | 15,643 | 6.8% |
| Inorganic chemicals; organic or inorganic compounds of precious metals, of rare-earth metals, of radioactive elements or of isotopes | 227,188 | 4 | Germany | 15,194 | 6.7% |
| Inorganic chemicals; organic or inorganic compounds of precious metals, of rare-earth metals, of radioactive elements or of isotopes | 227,188 | 5 | Japan | 10,416 | 4.6% |
| Organic chemicals | 537,854 | 1 | China | 101,887 | 18.9% |
| Organic chemicals | 537,854 | 2 | United States | 51,063 | 9.5% |
| Organic chemicals | 537,854 | 3 | Ireland | 46,369 | 8.6% |
| Organic chemicals | 537,854 | 4 | Germany | 34,089 | 6.3% |
| Organic chemicals | 537,854 | 5 | Belgium | 31,803 | 5.9% |
| Pharmaceutical products | 875,345 | 1 | Germany | 129,185 | 14.8% |
| Pharmaceutical products | 875,345 | 2 | Belgium | 104,248 | 11.9% |
| Pharmaceutical products | 875,345 | 3 | Switzerland | 98,363 | 11.2% |
| Pharmaceutical products | 875,345 | 4 | United States | 91,724 | 10.5% |
| Pharmaceutical products | 875,345 | 5 | Ireland | 75,569 | 10.5% |
| Fertilisers | 133,192 | 1 | Russia | 20,649 | 15.5% |
| Fertilisers | 133,192 | 2 | Canada | 13,728 | 10.3% |
| Fertilisers | 133,192 | 3 | China | 11,380 | 8.5% |
| Fertilisers | 133,192 | 4 | United States | 8,472 | 6.4% |
| Fertilisers | 133,192 | 5 | Morocco | 7,715 | 5.8% |
| Tanning or dyeing extracts; tannins and their derivatives; dyes, pigments and other colouring matter; paints and varnishes; putty and other mastics; inks | 90,788 | 1 | Germany | 13,122 | 14.5% |
| Tanning or dyeing extracts; tannins and their derivatives; dyes, pigments and other colouring matter; paints and varnishes; putty and other mastics; inks | 90,788 | 2 | China | 10,522 | 11.6% |
| Tanning or dyeing extracts; tannins and their derivatives; dyes, pigments and other colouring matter; paints and varnishes; putty and other mastics; inks | 90,788 | 3 | United States | 8,643 | 9.5% |
| Tanning or dyeing extracts; tannins and their derivatives; dyes, pigments and other colouring matter; paints and varnishes; putty and other mastics; inks | 90,788 | 4 | Netherlands | 4,986 | 5.5% |
| Tanning or dyeing extracts; tannins and their derivatives; dyes, pigments and other colouring matter; paints and varnishes; putty and other mastics; inks | 90,788 | 5 | Belgium | 4,716 | 5.2% |
| Essential oils and resinoids; perfumery, cosmetic or toilet preparations | 164,825 | 1 | France | 22,921 | 13.9% |
| Essential oils and resinoids; perfumery, cosmetic or toilet preparations | 164,825 | 2 | United States | 14,250 | 8.6% |
| Essential oils and resinoids; perfumery, cosmetic or toilet preparations | 164,825 | 3 | Germany | 12,020 | 7.3% |
| Essential oils and resinoids; perfumery, cosmetic or toilet preparations | 164,825 | 4 | Ireland | 10,480 | 6.4% |
| Essential oils and resinoids; perfumery, cosmetic or toilet preparations | 164,825 | 5 | Singapore | 10,216 | 6.2% |
| Soap, organic surface-active agents, washing preparations, lubricating preparations, artificial waxes, prepared waxes, polishing or scouring preparations, candles and similar articles, modelling pastes, 'dental waxes' and dental preparations with a basis of plaster | 77,254 | 1 | Germany | 9,614 | 12.4% |
| Soap, organic surface-active agents, washing preparations, lubricating preparations, artificial waxes, prepared waxes, polishing or scouring preparations, candles and similar articles, modelling pastes, 'dental waxes' and dental preparations with a basis of plaster | 77,254 | 2 | United States | 8,441 | 10.9% |
| Soap, organic surface-active agents, washing preparations, lubricating preparations, artificial waxes, prepared waxes, polishing or scouring preparations, candles and similar articles, modelling pastes, 'dental waxes' and dental preparations with a basis of plaster | 77,254 | 3 | China | 7,107 | 9.2% |
| Soap, organic surface-active agents, washing preparations, lubricating preparations, artificial waxes, prepared waxes, polishing or scouring preparations, candles and similar articles, modelling pastes, 'dental waxes' and dental preparations with a basis of plaster | 77,254 | 4 | Belgium | 4,550 | 5.9% |
| Soap, organic surface-active agents, washing preparations, lubricating preparations, artificial waxes, prepared waxes, polishing or scouring preparations, candles and similar articles, modelling pastes, 'dental waxes' and dental preparations with a basis of plaster | 77,254 | 5 | France | 4,062 | 5.3% |
| Albuminoidal substances; modified starches; glues; enzymes | 42,619 | 1 | United States | 5,203 | 12.2% |
| Albuminoidal substances; modified starches; glues; enzymes | 42,619 | 2 | Germany | 5,038 | 11.8% |
| Albuminoidal substances; modified starches; glues; enzymes | 42,619 | 3 | China | 4,888 | 11.5% |
| Albuminoidal substances; modified starches; glues; enzymes | 42,619 | 4 | Netherlands | 3,649 | 8.6% |
| Albuminoidal substances; modified starches; glues; enzymes | 42,619 | 5 | Denmark | 2,553 | 6.0% |
| Explosives; pyrotechnic products; matches; pyrophoric alloys; certain combustible preparations | 5,324 | 1 | China | 1,229 | 23.1% |
| Explosives; pyrotechnic products; matches; pyrophoric alloys; certain combustible preparations | 5,324 | 2 | United States | 751 | 14.1% |
| Explosives; pyrotechnic products; matches; pyrophoric alloys; certain combustible preparations | 5,324 | 3 | France | 357 | 6.7% |
| Explosives; pyrotechnic products; matches; pyrophoric alloys; certain combustible preparations | 5,324 | 4 | Czech Republic | 294 | 5.5% |
| Explosives; pyrotechnic products; matches; pyrophoric alloys; certain combustible preparations | 5,324 | 5 | Germany | 270 | 5.1% |
| Photographic or cinematographic goods | 15,171 | 1 | Japan | 5,129 | 33.8% |
| Photographic or cinematographic goods | 15,171 | 2 | United States | 2,195 | 14.5% |
| Photographic or cinematographic goods | 15,171 | 3 | China | 1,429 | 9.4% |
| Photographic or cinematographic goods | 15,171 | 4 | Germany | 1,158 | 7.6% |
| Photographic or cinematographic goods | 15,171 | 5 | South Korea | 1,121 | 7.4% |
| Miscellaneous chemical products | 297,436 | 1 | China | 45,205 | 15.2% |
| Miscellaneous chemical products | 297,436 | 2 | United States | 32,960 | 11.1% |
| Miscellaneous chemical products | 297,436 | 3 | Germany | 29,632 | 10.0% |
| Miscellaneous chemical products | 297,436 | 4 | Netherlands | 22,454 | 7.5% |
| Miscellaneous chemical products | 297,436 | 5 | Belgium | 15,141 | 5.1% |
| Plastics and articles thereof | 815,554 | 1 | China | 143,529 | 17.6% |
| Plastics and articles thereof | 815,554 | 2 | United States | 83,283 | 10.2% |
| Plastics and articles thereof | 815,554 | 3 | Germany | 73,910 | 9.1% |
| Plastics and articles thereof | 815,554 | 4 | South Korea | 41,158 | 5.0% |
| Plastics and articles thereof | 815,554 | 5 | Belgium | 39,318 | 4.8% |
| Rubber and articles thereof | 218,588 | 1 | China | 31,473 | 14.4% |
| Rubber and articles thereof | 218,588 | 2 | Thailand | 18,824 | 8.6% |
| Rubber and articles thereof | 218,588 | 3 | Germany | 17,269 | 7.9% |
| Rubber and articles thereof | 218,588 | 4 | United States | 14,657 | 6.7% |
| Rubber and articles thereof | 218,588 | 5 | Japan | 10,712 | 4.9% |
| Raw hides and skins (other than furskins) and leather | 17,982 | 1 | Italy | 3,628 | 20.2% |
| Raw hides and skins (other than furskins) and leather | 17,982 | 2 | United States | 1,762 | 9.8% |
| Raw hides and skins (other than furskins) and leather | 17,982 | 3 | Brazil | 1,219 | 6.8% |
| Raw hides and skins (other than furskins) and leather | 17,982 | 4 | China | 979 | 5.4% |
| Raw hides and skins (other than furskins) and leather | 17,982 | 5 | Spain | 687 | 3.8% |
| Articles of leather; saddlery and harness; travel goods, handbags and similar containers; articles of animal gut (other than silkworm gut) | 103,181 | 1 | China | 38,713 | 37.5% |
| Articles of leather; saddlery and harness; travel goods, handbags and similar containers; articles of animal gut (other than silkworm gut) | 103,181 | 2 | Italy | 13,391 | 13.0% |
| Articles of leather; saddlery and harness; travel goods, handbags and similar containers; articles of animal gut (other than silkworm gut) | 103,181 | 3 | France | 12,816 | 12.4% |
| Articles of leather; saddlery and harness; travel goods, handbags and similar containers; articles of animal gut (other than silkworm gut) | 103,181 | 4 | Vietnam | 5,278 | 5.1% |
| Articles of leather; saddlery and harness; travel goods, handbags and similar containers; articles of animal gut (other than silkworm gut) | 103,181 | 5 | Hong Kong | 3,017 | 2.9% |
| Furskins and artificial fur; manufactures thereof | 4,420 | 1 | China | 2,048 | 46.3% |
| Furskins and artificial fur; manufactures thereof | 4,420 | 2 | Italy | 447 | 10.1% |
| Furskins and artificial fur; manufactures thereof | 4,420 | 3 | Finland | 249 | 5.6% |
| Furskins and artificial fur; manufactures thereof | 4,420 | 4 | Turkey | 163 | 3.7% |
| Furskins and artificial fur; manufactures thereof | 4,420 | 5 | Cambodia | 163 | 3.7% |
| Wood and articles of wood; wood charcoal | 183,202 | 1 | Canada | 19,747 | 10.8% |
| Wood and articles of wood; wood charcoal | 183,202 | 2 | China | 18,277 | 10.0% |
| Wood and articles of wood; wood charcoal | 183,202 | 3 | Germany | 12,847 | 7.0% |
| Wood and articles of wood; wood charcoal | 183,202 | 4 | United States | 10,439 | 5.7% |
| Wood and articles of wood; wood charcoal | 183,202 | 5 | Russia | 9,204 | 5.0% |
| Cork and articles of cork | 2,187 | 1 | Portugal | 1,275 | 58.3% |
| Cork and articles of cork | 2,187 | 2 | Spain | 432 | 19.3% |
| Cork and articles of cork | 2,187 | 3 | France | 114 | 5.2% |
| Cork and articles of cork | 2,187 | 4 | Italy | 71 | 3.3% |
| Cork and articles of cork | 2,187 | 5 | China | 39 | 1.8% |
| Manufactures of straw, of esparto or of other plaiting materials; basketware and wickerwork | 3,473 | 1 | China | 1,903 | 54.8% |
| Manufactures of straw, of esparto or of other plaiting materials; basketware and wickerwork | 3,473 | 2 | Vietnam | 466 | 13.4% |
| Manufactures of straw, of esparto or of other plaiting materials; basketware and wickerwork | 3,473 | 3 | Indonesia | 128 | 3.7% |
| Manufactures of straw, of esparto or of other plaiting materials; basketware and wickerwork | 3,473 | 4 | Netherlands | 107 | 3.1% |
| Manufactures of straw, of esparto or of other plaiting materials; basketware and wickerwork | 3,473 | 5 | Poland | 73 | 2.1% |
| Pulp of wood or of other fibrous cellulosic material; recovered (waste and scrap) paper or paperboard | 58,176 | 1 | United States | 10,851 | 18.7% |
| Pulp of wood or of other fibrous cellulosic material; recovered (waste and scrap) paper or paperboard | 58,176 | 2 | Brazil | 8,389 | 14.4% |
| Pulp of wood or of other fibrous cellulosic material; recovered (waste and scrap) paper or paperboard | 58,176 | 3 | Canada | 6,816 | 11.7% |
| Pulp of wood or of other fibrous cellulosic material; recovered (waste and scrap) paper or paperboard | 58,176 | 4 | Indonesia | 3,702 | 6.4% |
| Pulp of wood or of other fibrous cellulosic material; recovered (waste and scrap) paper or paperboard | 58,176 | 5 | Sweden | 3,192 | 5.5% |
| Paper and paperboard; articles of paper pulp, of paper or of paperboard | 210,405 | 1 | China | 31,632 | 15.0% |
| Paper and paperboard; articles of paper pulp, of paper or of paperboard | 210,405 | 2 | Germany | 25,117 | 11.9% |
| Paper and paperboard; articles of paper pulp, of paper or of paperboard | 210,405 | 3 | United States | 16,985 | 8.1% |
| Paper and paperboard; articles of paper pulp, of paper or of paperboard | 210,405 | 4 | Italy | 10,130 | 4.8% |
| Paper and paperboard; articles of paper pulp, of paper or of paperboard | 210,405 | 5 | Sweden | 9,853 | 4.7% |
| Printed books, newspapers, pictures and other products of the printing industry; manuscripts, typescripts and plans | 35,117 | 1 | China | 4,350 | 12.4% |
| Printed books, newspapers, pictures and other products of the printing industry; manuscripts, typescripts and plans | 35,117 | 2 | United States | 4,246 | 12.1% |
| Printed books, newspapers, pictures and other products of the printing industry; manuscripts, typescripts and plans | 35,117 | 3 | Germany | 3,636 | 10.4% |
| Printed books, newspapers, pictures and other products of the printing industry; manuscripts, typescripts and plans | 35,117 | 4 | United Kingdom | 2,994 | 8.5% |
| Printed books, newspapers, pictures and other products of the printing industry; manuscripts, typescripts and plans | 35,117 | 5 | Poland | 2,356 | 6.7% |
| Silk | 1,922 | 1 | China | 933 | 48.5% |
| Silk | 1,922 | 2 | Italy | 282 | 14.7% |
| Silk | 1,922 | 3 | Vietnam | 157 | 8.1% |
| Silk | 1,922 | 4 | India | 95 | 4.9% |
| Silk | 1,922 | 5 | Uzbekistan | 94 | 4.9% |
| Wool, fine or coarse animal hair; horsehair yarn and woven fabric | 11,944 | 1 | Australia | 2,403 | 20.1% |
| Wool, fine or coarse animal hair; horsehair yarn and woven fabric | 11,944 | 2 | China | 2,260 | 18.9% |
| Wool, fine or coarse animal hair; horsehair yarn and woven fabric | 11,944 | 3 | Italy | 2,193 | 18.4% |
| Wool, fine or coarse animal hair; horsehair yarn and woven fabric | 11,944 | 4 | Germany | 535 | 4.5% |
| Wool, fine or coarse animal hair; horsehair yarn and woven fabric | 11,944 | 5 | Mongolia | 455 | 3.8% |
| Cotton | 63,174 | 1 | China | 13,264 | 21.0% |
| Cotton | 63,174 | 2 | United States | 10,744 | 17.0% |
| Cotton | 63,174 | 3 | India | 6,943 | 11.0% |
| Cotton | 63,174 | 4 | Brazil | 3,892 | 6.2% |
| Cotton | 63,174 | 5 | Pakistan | 3,419 | 5.4% |
| Other vegetable textile fibres; paper yarn and woven fabrics of paper yarn | 6,129 | 1 | China | 1,617 | 26.4% |
| Other vegetable textile fibres; paper yarn and woven fabrics of paper yarn | 6,129 | 2 | Bangladesh | 859 | 14.0% |
| Other vegetable textile fibres; paper yarn and woven fabrics of paper yarn | 6,129 | 3 | Belgium | 639 | 10.4% |
| Other vegetable textile fibres; paper yarn and woven fabrics of paper yarn | 6,129 | 4 | France | 599 | 9.8% |
| Other vegetable textile fibres; paper yarn and woven fabrics of paper yarn | 6,129 | 5 | India | 543 | 8.9% |
| Man-made filaments; strip and the like of man-made textile materials | 58,256 | 1 | China | 29,583 | 50.8% |
| Man-made filaments; strip and the like of man-made textile materials | 58,256 | 2 | Taiwan | 2,575 | 4.4% |
| Man-made filaments; strip and the like of man-made textile materials | 58,256 | 3 | South Korea | 2,508 | 4.3% |
| Man-made filaments; strip and the like of man-made textile materials | 58,256 | 4 | Italy | 2,191 | 3.8% |
| Man-made filaments; strip and the like of man-made textile materials | 58,256 | 5 | India | 2.061 | 3.5% |
| Man-made staple fibres | 38,480 | 1 | China | 14,513 | 37.7% |
| Man-made staple fibres | 38,480 | 2 | United States | 2,320 | 6.0% |
| Man-made staple fibres | 38,480 | 3 | Indonesia | 2,103 | 5.5% |
| Man-made staple fibres | 38,480 | 4 | India | 1,887 | 4.9% |
| Man-made staple fibres | 38,480 | 5 | Turkey | 1,525 | 4.0% |
| Wadding, felt and nonwovens; special yarns; twine, cordage, ropes and cables and articles thereof | 31,317 | 1 | China | 7,949 | 25.4% |
| Wadding, felt and nonwovens; special yarns; twine, cordage, ropes and cables and articles thereof | 31,317 | 2 | Germany | 2,790 | 8.9% |
| Wadding, felt and nonwovens; special yarns; twine, cordage, ropes and cables and articles thereof | 31,317 | 3 | United States | 2,612 | 8.3% |
| Wadding, felt and nonwovens; special yarns; twine, cordage, ropes and cables and articles thereof | 31,317 | 4 | Italy | 1,946 | 6.2% |
| Wadding, felt and nonwovens; special yarns; twine, cordage, ropes and cables and articles thereof | 31,317 | 5 | Japan | 1,237 | 4.0% |
| Carpets and other textile floor coverings | 16,782 | 1 | China | 3,854 | 23.0% |
| Carpets and other textile floor coverings | 16,782 | 2 | Turkey | 2,820 | 16.8% |
| Carpets and other textile floor coverings | 16,782 | 3 | India | 1,946 | 11.6% |
| Carpets and other textile floor coverings | 16,782 | 4 | Belgium | 1,386 | 8.3% |
| Carpets and other textile floor coverings | 16,782 | 5 | Netherlands | 1,264 | 7.5% |
| Special woven fabrics; tufted textile fabrics; lace; tapestries; trimmings; embroidery | 12,936 | 1 | China | 6,101 | 47.2% |
| Special woven fabrics; tufted textile fabrics; lace; tapestries; trimmings; embroidery | 12,936 | 2 | Hong Kong | 784 | 6.1% |
| Special woven fabrics; tufted textile fabrics; lace; tapestries; trimmings; embroidery | 12,936 | 3 | Italy | 593 | 4.6% |
| Special woven fabrics; tufted textile fabrics; lace; tapestries; trimmings; embroidery | 12,936 | 4 | Taiwan | 566 | 4.4% |
| Special woven fabrics; tufted textile fabrics; lace; tapestries; trimmings; embroidery | 12,936 | 5 | Germany | 538 | 4.2% |
| Impregnated, coated, covered or laminated textile fabrics; textile articles of a kind suitable for industrial use | 29,104 | 1 | China | 10,239 | 35.2% |
| Impregnated, coated, covered or laminated textile fabrics; textile articles of a kind suitable for industrial use | 29,104 | 2 | Germany | 2,624 | 9.0% |
| Impregnated, coated, covered or laminated textile fabrics; textile articles of a kind suitable for industrial use | 29,104 | 3 | United States | 2,235 | 7.7% |
| Impregnated, coated, covered or laminated textile fabrics; textile articles of a kind suitable for industrial use | 29,104 | 4 | South Korea | 1,260 | 4.3% |
| Impregnated, coated, covered or laminated textile fabrics; textile articles of a kind suitable for industrial use | 29,104 | 5 | Italy | 1,259 | 4.3% |
| Knitted or crocheted fabrics | 42,648 | 1 | China | 23,898 | 56.0% |
| Knitted or crocheted fabrics | 42,648 | 2 | Taiwan | 2,423 | 5.7% |
| Knitted or crocheted fabrics | 42,648 | 3 | South Korea | 2,253 | 5.3% |
| Knitted or crocheted fabrics | 42,648 | 4 | Turkey | 2,052 | 4.8% |
| Knitted or crocheted fabrics | 42,648 | 5 | Vietnam | 1,360 | 3.2% |
| Articles of apparel and clothing accessories, knitted or crocheted | 297,695 | 1 | China | 90,942 | 30.5% |
| Articles of apparel and clothing accessories, knitted or crocheted | 297,695 | 2 | Bangladesh | 31,271 | 10.5% |
| Articles of apparel and clothing accessories, knitted or crocheted | 297,695 | 3 | Vietnam | 21,588 | 7.3% |
| Articles of apparel and clothing accessories, knitted or crocheted | 297,695 | 4 | Germany | 13,179 | 4.4% |
| Articles of apparel and clothing accessories, knitted or crocheted | 297,695 | 5 | Italy | 12,369 | 4.2% |
| Articles of apparel and clothing accessories, not knitted or crocheted | 260,975 | 1 | China | 76,874 | 29.2% |
| Articles of apparel and clothing accessories, not knitted or crocheted | 260,975 | 2 | Bangladesh | 24,911 | 9.5% |
| Articles of apparel and clothing accessories, not knitted or crocheted | 260,975 | 3 | Vietnam | 20,227 | 7.8% |
| Articles of apparel and clothing accessories, not knitted or crocheted | 260,975 | 4 | Italy | 16,050 | 6.2% |
| Articles of apparel and clothing accessories, not knitted or crocheted | 260,975 | 5 | Germany | 11,934 | 4.6% |
| Other made-up textile articles; sets; worn clothing and worn textile articles; rags | 84,990 | 1 | China | 37,667 | 44.3% |
| Other made-up textile articles; sets; worn clothing and worn textile articles; rags | 84,990 | 2 | India | 6,020 | 7.1% |
| Other made-up textile articles; sets; worn clothing and worn textile articles; rags | 84,990 | 3 | Pakistan | 5,638 | 6.6% |
| Other made-up textile articles; sets; worn clothing and worn textile articles; rags | 84,990 | 4 | Germany | 3,396 | 4.0% |
| Other made-up textile articles; sets; worn clothing and worn textile articles; rags | 84,990 | 5 | United States | 2,940 | 3.5% |
| Footwear, gaiters and the like; parts of such articles | 188,748 | 1 | China | 62,020 | 32.9% |
| Footwear, gaiters and the like; parts of such articles | 188,748 | 2 | Vietnam | 34,170 | 18.1% |
| Footwear, gaiters and the like; parts of such articles | 188,748 | 3 | Italy | 15,175 | 8.0% |
| Footwear, gaiters and the like; parts of such articles | 188,748 | 4 | Germany | 9,986 | 5.3% |
| Footwear, gaiters and the like; parts of such articles | 188,748 | 5 | Belgium | 7,814 | 4.1% |
| Headgear and parts thereof | 15,724 | 1 | China | 6,891 | 43.8% |
| Headgear and parts thereof | 15,724 | 2 | Vietnam | 1,056 | 6.7% |
| Headgear and parts thereof | 15,724 | 3 | Italy | 859 | 5.5% |
| Headgear and parts thereof | 15,724 | 4 | Germany | 748 | 4.8% |
| Headgear and parts thereof | 15,724 | 5 | Bangladesh | 740 | 4.7% |
| Umbrellas, sun umbrellas, walking sticks, seat-sticks, whips, riding-crops and parts thereof | 4,644 | 1 | China | 3,605 | 77.6% |
| Umbrellas, sun umbrellas, walking sticks, seat-sticks, whips, riding-crops and parts thereof | 4,644 | 2 | Netherlands | 126 | 2.7% |
| Umbrellas, sun umbrellas, walking sticks, seat-sticks, whips, riding-crops and parts thereof | 4,644 | 3 | Germany | 119 | 2.6% |
| Umbrellas, sun umbrellas, walking sticks, seat-sticks, whips, riding-crops and parts thereof | 4,644 | 4 | Austria | 72 | 1.5% |
| Umbrellas, sun umbrellas, walking sticks, seat-sticks, whips, riding-crops and parts thereof | 4,644 | 5 | Belgium | 62 | 1.3% |
| Prepared feathers and down and articles made of feathers or of down; artificial flowers; articles of human hair | 15,378 | 1 | China | 12,454 | 81.0% |
| Prepared feathers and down and articles made of feathers or of down; artificial flowers; articles of human hair | 15,378 | 2 | India | 488 | 3.2% |
| Prepared feathers and down and articles made of feathers or of down; artificial flowers; articles of human hair | 15,378 | 3 | Indonesia | 437 | 2.8% |
| Prepared feathers and down and articles made of feathers or of down; artificial flowers; articles of human hair | 15,378 | 4 | Bangladesh | 257 | 1.7% |
| Prepared feathers and down and articles made of feathers or of down; artificial flowers; articles of human hair | 15,378 | 5 | Germany | 188 | 1.2% |
| Articles of stone, plaster, cement, asbestos, mica or similar materials | 64,420 | 1 | China | 15,572 | 24.2% |
| Articles of stone, plaster, cement, asbestos, mica or similar materials | 64,420 | 2 | Germany | 5,598 | 8.7% |
| Articles of stone, plaster, cement, asbestos, mica or similar materials | 64,420 | 3 | United States | 4,288 | 6.7% |
| Articles of stone, plaster, cement, asbestos, mica or similar materials | 64,420 | 4 | Italy | 3,852 | 6.0% |
| Articles of stone, plaster, cement, asbestos, mica or similar materials | 64,420 | 5 | Spain | 2,657 | 4.1% |
| Ceramic products | 75,789 | 1 | China | 32,475 | 42.8% |
| Ceramic products | 75,789 | 2 | Italy | 7,071 | 9.3% |
| Ceramic products | 75,789 | 3 | Spain | 5,576 | 7.4% |
| Ceramic products | 75,789 | 4 | Germany | 4,257 | 5.6% |
| Ceramic products | 75,789 | 5 | United States | 2,489 | 3.3% |
| Glass and glassware | 92,672 | 1 | China | 26,656 | 28.8% |
| Glass and glassware | 92,672 | 2 | Germany | 7,898 | 8.5% |
| Glass and glassware | 92,672 | 3 | United States | 6,093 | 6.6% |
| Glass and glassware | 92,672 | 4 | France | 3,607 | 3.9% |
| Glass and glassware | 92,672 | 5 | Italy | 3,451 | 3.7% |
| Natural or cultured pearls, precious or semi-precious stones, precious metals, metals clad with precious metal, and articles thereof; imitation jewellery; coin | 866,839 | 1 | Switzerland | 120,443 | 13.9% |
| Natural or cultured pearls, precious or semi-precious stones, precious metals, metals clad with precious metal, and articles thereof; imitation jewellery; coin | 866,839 | 2 | United Kingdom | 98,458 | 11.4% |
| Natural or cultured pearls, precious or semi-precious stones, precious metals, metals clad with precious metal, and articles thereof; imitation jewellery; coin | 866,839 | 3 | United States | 92,472 | 10.7% |
| Natural or cultured pearls, precious or semi-precious stones, precious metals, metals clad with precious metal, and articles thereof; imitation jewellery; coin | 866,839 | 4 | Hong Kong | 68,859 | 7.9% |
| Natural or cultured pearls, precious or semi-precious stones, precious metals, metals clad with precious metal, and articles thereof; imitation jewellery; coin | 866,839 | 5 | United Arab Emirates | 44,671 | 5.2% |
| Iron and steel | 564,547 | 1 | China | 77,265 | 13.7% |
| Iron and steel | 564,547 | 2 | Germany | 37,031 | 6.6% |
| Iron and steel | 564,547 | 3 | Japan | 35,162 | 6.2% |
| Iron and steel | 564,547 | 4 | South Korea | 28,108 | 5.0% |
| Iron and steel | 564,547 | 5 | Indonesia | 27,823 | 4.9% |
| Articles of iron or steel | 402,100 | 1 | China | 110,952 | 27.6% |
| Articles of iron or steel | 402,100 | 2 | Germany | 34,119 | 8.5% |
| Articles of iron or steel | 402,100 | 3 | United States | 24,376 | 6.1% |
| Articles of iron or steel | 402,100 | 4 | Italy | 24,186 | 6.0% |
| Articles of iron or steel | 402,100 | 5 | South Korea | 12,391 | 3.1% |
| Copper and articles thereof | 215,827 | 1 | Chile | 21,556 | 10.0% |
| Copper and articles thereof | 215,827 | 2 | (Democratic Republic of the Congo) DR Congo | 16,835 | 7.8% |
| Copper and articles thereof | 215,827 | 3 | Germany | 15,727 | 7.3% |
| Copper and articles thereof | 215,827 | 4 | Japan | 12,566 | 5.8% |
| Copper and articles thereof | 215,827 | 5 | China | 10,679 | 4.9% |
| Nickel and articles thereof | 40,971 | 1 | Indonesia | 5,978 | 14.6% |
| Nickel and articles thereof | 40,971 | 2 | Canada | 5,233 | 12.8% |
| Nickel and articles thereof | 40,971 | 3 | Russia | 4,979 | 12.2% |
| Nickel and articles thereof | 40,971 | 4 | United States | 3,143 | 7.7% |
| Nickel and articles thereof | 40,971 | 5 | Norway | 2,069 | 5.0% |
| Aluminium and articles thereof | 279,894 | 1 | China | 42,109 | 15.0% |
| Aluminium and articles thereof | 279,894 | 2 | Germany | 20,809 | 7.4% |
| Aluminium and articles thereof | 279,894 | 3 | United States | 14,511 | 5.2% |
| Aluminium and articles thereof | 279,894 | 4 | Canada | 14,138 | 5.1% |
| Aluminium and articles thereof | 279,894 | 5 | Russia | 10,225 | 3.7% |
| Lead and articles thereof | 8,494 | 1 | South Korea | 805 | 9.5% |
| Lead and articles thereof | 8,494 | 2 | Australia | 780 | 9.2% |
| Lead and articles thereof | 8,494 | 3 | United Kingdom | 613 | 7.2% |
| Lead and articles thereof | 8,494 | 4 | India | 471 | 5.5% |
| Lead and articles thereof | 8,494 | 5 | Canada | 388 | 4.6% |
| Zinc and articles thereof | 22,672 | 1 | South Korea | 2,106 | 9.3% |
| Zinc and articles thereof | 22,672 | 2 | Belgium | 1,900 | 8.4% |
| Zinc and articles thereof | 22,672 | 3 | Netherlands | 1,622 | 7.2% |
| Zinc and articles thereof | 22,672 | 4 | Canada | 1,562 | 6.9% |
| Zinc and articles thereof | 22,672 | 5 | India | 1,355 | 6.0% |
| Tin and articles thereof | 8,474 | 1 | Indonesia | 2,389 | 28.2% |
| Tin and articles thereof | 8,474 | 2 | Peru | 734 | 8.7% |
| Tin and articles thereof | 8,474 | 3 | Malaysia | 573 | 6.8% |
| Tin and articles thereof | 8,474 | 4 | Singapore | 567 | 6.7% |
| Tin and articles thereof | 8,474 | 5 | Bolivia | 511 | 6.0% |
| Other base metals; cermets; articles thereof | 24,469 | 1 | China | 6,645 | 27.2% |
| Other base metals; cermets; articles thereof | 24,469 | 2 | United States | 3,157 | 12.9% |
| Other base metals; cermets; articles thereof | 24,469 | 3 | Germany | 1,806 | 7.4% |
| Other base metals; cermets; articles thereof | 24,469 | 4 | Japan | 1,190 | 4.9% |
| Other base metals; cermets; articles thereof | 24,469 | 5 | United Kingdom | 1,107 | 4.5% |
| Tools, implements, cutlery, spoons and forks, of base metal; parts thereof of base metal | 75,453 | 1 | China | 24,088 | 31.9% |
| Tools, implements, cutlery, spoons and forks, of base metal; parts thereof of base metal | 75,453 | 2 | Germany | 9,525 | 12.6% |
| Tools, implements, cutlery, spoons and forks, of base metal; parts thereof of base metal | 75,453 | 3 | United States | 5,078 | 6.7% |
| Tools, implements, cutlery, spoons and forks, of base metal; parts thereof of base metal | 75,453 | 4 | Taiwan | 3,522 | 4.7% |
| Tools, implements, cutlery, spoons and forks, of base metal; parts thereof of base metal | 75,453 | 5 | Japan | 3,471 | 4.6% |
| Miscellaneous articles of base metal | 86,248 | 1 | China | 28,719 | 33.3% |
| Miscellaneous articles of base metal | 86,248 | 2 | Germany | 8,533 | 9.9% |
| Miscellaneous articles of base metal | 86,248 | 3 | United States | 5,697 | 6.6% |
| Miscellaneous articles of base metal | 86,248 | 4 | Italy | 4,448 | 5.2% |
| Miscellaneous articles of base metal | 86,248 | 5 | Austria | 3,130 | 3.6% |
| Nuclear reactors, boilers, machinery and mechanical appliances; parts thereof | 2,573,572 | 1 | China | 569,714 | 22.1% |
| Nuclear reactors, boilers, machinery and mechanical appliances; parts thereof | 2,573,572 | 2 | Germany | 251,838 | 9.8% |
| Nuclear reactors, boilers, machinery and mechanical appliances; parts thereof | 2,573,572 | 3 | United States | 230,516 | 9.0% |
| Nuclear reactors, boilers, machinery and mechanical appliances; parts thereof | 2,573,572 | 4 | Japan | 144,273 | 5.6% |
| Nuclear reactors, boilers, machinery and mechanical appliances; parts thereof | 2,573,572 | 5 | Italy | 113,038 | 4.4% |
| Electrical machinery and equipment and parts thereof; sound recorders and reproducers, television image and sound recorders and reproducers, and parts and accessories of such articles | 3,493,553 | 1 | China | 917,880 | 26.3% |
| Electrical machinery and equipment and parts thereof; sound recorders and reproducers, television image and sound recorders and reproducers, and parts and accessories of such articles | 3,493,553 | 2 | Hong Kong | 357,230 | 10.2% |
| Electrical machinery and equipment and parts thereof; sound recorders and reproducers, television image and sound recorders and reproducers, and parts and accessories of such articles | 3,493,553 | 3 | Taiwan | 246,219 | 7.0% |
| Electrical machinery and equipment and parts thereof; sound recorders and reproducers, television image and sound recorders and reproducers, and parts and accessories of such articles | 3,493,553 | 4 | United States | 196,015 | 5.6% |
| Electrical machinery and equipment and parts thereof; sound recorders and reproducers, television image and sound recorders and reproducers, and parts and accessories of such articles | 3,493,553 | 5 | South Korea | 191,370 | 5.5% |
| Railway or tramway locomotives, rolling stock and parts thereof; railway or tramway track fixtures and fittings and parts thereof; mechanical (including electromechanical) traffic signalling equipment of all kinds | 50,804 | 1 | China | 18,644 | 36.7% |
| Railway or tramway locomotives, rolling stock and parts thereof; railway or tramway track fixtures and fittings and parts thereof; mechanical (including electromechanical) traffic signalling equipment of all kinds | 50,804 | 2 | Mexico | 4,180 | 8.2% |
| Railway or tramway locomotives, rolling stock and parts thereof; railway or tramway track fixtures and fittings and parts thereof; mechanical (including electromechanical) traffic signalling equipment of all kinds | 50,804 | 3 | United States | 3,530 | 6.9% |
| Railway or tramway locomotives, rolling stock and parts thereof; railway or tramway track fixtures and fittings and parts thereof; mechanical (including electromechanical) traffic signalling equipment of all kinds | 50,804 | 4 | Germany | 3,064 | 6.0% |
| Railway or tramway locomotives, rolling stock and parts thereof; railway or tramway track fixtures and fittings and parts thereof; mechanical (including electromechanical) traffic signalling equipment of all kinds | 50,804 | 5 | Poland | 1,853 | 3.6% |
| Vehicles (motor vehicles, tractors, bicycles, motorcycles, trucks, tanks, carriages, trailers), and parts and accessories thereof | 1,621,658 | 1 | Germany | 256,907 | 15.8% |
| Vehicles (motor vehicles, tractors, bicycles, motorcycles, trucks, tanks, carriages, trailers), and parts and accessories thereof | 1,621,658 | 2 | China | 157,340 | 9.7% |
| Vehicles (motor vehicles, tractors, bicycles, motorcycles, trucks, tanks, carriages, trailers), and parts and accessories thereof | 1,621,658 | 3 | Japan | 137,245 | 8.5% |
| Vehicles (motor vehicles, tractors, bicycles, motorcycles, trucks, tanks, carriages, trailers), and parts and accessories thereof | 1,621,658 | 4 | Mexico | 136,075 | 8.4% |
| Vehicles (motor vehicles, tractors, bicycles, motorcycles, trucks, tanks, carriages, trailers), and parts and accessories thereof | 1,621,658 | 5 | United States | 135,127 | 8.3% |
| Aircraft, spacecraft, and parts thereof | 149,790 | 1 | France | 32,890 | 21.9% |
| Aircraft, spacecraft, and parts thereof | 149,790 | 2 | Germany | 29,157 | 19.5% |
| Aircraft, spacecraft, and parts thereof | 149,790 | 3 | United Kingdom | 13,206 | 8.8% |
| Aircraft, spacecraft, and parts thereof | 149,790 | 4 | Canada | 10,124 | 6.8% |
| Aircraft, spacecraft, and parts thereof | 149,790 | 5 | United States | 8,980 | 6.0% |
| Ships, boats and floating structures | 120,452 | 1 | China | 26,416 | 21.9% |
| Ships, boats and floating structures | 120,452 | 2 | South Korea | 17,138 | 14.2% |
| Ships, boats and floating structures | 120,452 | 3 | Italy | 10,275 | 8.5% |
| Ships, boats and floating structures | 120,452 | 4 | Japan | 9,099 | 7.6% |
| Ships, boats and floating structures | 120,452 | 5 | Germany | 6,212 | 5.2% |
| Optical, photographic, cinematographic, measuring, checking, precision, medical or surgical instruments and apparatus; parts and accessories thereof | 669,128 | 1 | United States | 96,981 | 14.5% |
| Optical, photographic, cinematographic, measuring, checking, precision, medical or surgical instruments and apparatus; parts and accessories thereof | 669,128 | 2 | China | 79,956 | 11.9% |
| Optical, photographic, cinematographic, measuring, checking, precision, medical or surgical instruments and apparatus; parts and accessories thereof | 669,128 | 3 | Germany | 77,751 | 11.9% |
| Optical, photographic, cinematographic, measuring, checking, precision, medical or surgical instruments and apparatus; parts and accessories thereof | 669,128 | 4 | Netherlands | 41,628 | 6.2% |
| Optical, photographic, cinematographic, measuring, checking, precision, medical or surgical instruments and apparatus; parts and accessories thereof | 669,128 | 5 | Japan | 39,847 | 6.0% |
| Clocks and watches and parts thereof | 55,589 | 1 | Switzerland | 26,029 | 46.8% |
| Clocks and watches and parts thereof | 55,589 | 2 | Hong Kong | 7,005 | 12.6% |
| Clocks and watches and parts thereof | 55,589 | 3 | China | 4,820 | 8.7% |
| Clocks and watches and parts thereof | 55,589 | 4 | France | 2,732 | 4.9% |
| Clocks and watches and parts thereof | 55,589 | 5 | Singapore | 2,282 | 4.1% |
| Musical instruments; parts and accessories of such articles | 8,565 | 1 | China | 2,190 | 26.2% |
| Musical instruments; parts and accessories of such articles | 8,565 | 2 | Germany | 1,000 | 12.0% |
| Musical instruments; parts and accessories of such articles | 8,565 | 3 | United States | 936 | 11.2% |
| Musical instruments; parts and accessories of such articles | 8,565 | 4 | Indonesia | 800 | 9.6% |
| Musical instruments; parts and accessories of such articles | 8,565 | 5 | Japan | 673 | 8.0% |
| Arms and ammunition; parts and accessories thereof | 21,214 | 1 | United States | 4,885 | 23.0% |
| Arms and ammunition; parts and accessories thereof | 21,214 | 2 | Italy | 2,089 | 9.8% |
| Arms and ammunition; parts and accessories thereof | 21,214 | 3 | Israel | 1,926 | 9.1% |
| Arms and ammunition; parts and accessories thereof | 21,214 | 4 | South Korea | 1,291 | 6.1% |
| Arms and ammunition; parts and accessories thereof | 21,214 | 5 | United Kingdom | 1,100 | 5.2% |
| Furniture; bedding, mattresses, mattress supports, cushions and similar stuffed furnishings; luminaires and lighting fittings, not elsewhere specified or included; illuminated signs, illuminated nameplates and the like; prefabricated buildings | 317,244 | 1 | China | 131,078 | 41.3% |
| Furniture; bedding, mattresses, mattress supports, cushions and similar stuffed furnishings; luminaires and lighting fittings, not elsewhere specified or included; illuminated signs, illuminated nameplates and the like; prefabricated buildings | 317,244 | 2 | Vietnam | 21,130 | 6.7% |
| Furniture; bedding, mattresses, mattress supports, cushions and similar stuffed furnishings; luminaires and lighting fittings, not elsewhere specified or included; illuminated signs, illuminated nameplates and the like; prefabricated buildings | 317,244 | 3 | Germany | 18,079 | 5.7% |
| Furniture; bedding, mattresses, mattress supports, cushions and similar stuffed furnishings; luminaires and lighting fittings, not elsewhere specified or included; illuminated signs, illuminated nameplates and the like; prefabricated buildings | 317,244 | 4 | Italy | 17,171 | 5.4% |
| Furniture; bedding, mattresses, mattress supports, cushions and similar stuffed furnishings; luminaires and lighting fittings, not elsewhere specified or included; illuminated signs, illuminated nameplates and the like; prefabricated buildings | 317,244 | 5 | Mexico | 12,784 | 4.0% |
| Toys, games and sports requisites; parts and accessories thereof | 179,084 | 1 | China | 104,830 | 58.5% |
| Toys, games and sports requisites; parts and accessories thereof | 179,084 | 2 | Vietnam | 8,359 | 4.7% |
| Toys, games and sports requisites; parts and accessories thereof | 179,084 | 3 | United States | 7,458 | 4.2% |
| Toys, games and sports requisites; parts and accessories thereof | 179,084 | 4 | Germany | 6,028 | 3.4% |
| Toys, games and sports requisites; parts and accessories thereof | 179,084 | 5 | Hong Kong | 4,488 | 2.5% |
| Miscellaneous manufactured articles | 63,868 | 1 | China | 26,839 | 42.0% |
| Miscellaneous manufactured articles | 63,868 | 2 | Germany | 4,425 | 6.9% |
| Miscellaneous manufactured articles | 63,868 | 3 | United States | 2,661 | 4.2% |
| Miscellaneous manufactured articles | 63,868 | 4 | Japan | 2,479 | 3.9% |
| Miscellaneous manufactured articles | 63,868 | 5 | Netherlands | 1,905 | 3.0% |
| Works of art, collectors' pieces and antiques | 33,843 | 1 | United States | 11,023 | 32.6% |
| Works of art, collectors' pieces and antiques | 33,843 | 2 | United Kingdom | 5,776 | 17.1% |
| Works of art, collectors' pieces and antiques | 33,843 | 3 | Hong Kong | 5,189 | 15.3% |
| Works of art, collectors' pieces and antiques | 33,843 | 4 | Switzerland | 2,366 | 7.0% |
| Works of art, collectors' pieces and antiques | 33,843 | 5 | France | 1,932 | 5.7% |
| Commodities not elsewhere specified | 579,849 | 1 | United States | 156,746 | 21.0% |
| Commodities not elsewhere specified | 579,849 | 2 | Japan | 57,289 | 9.9% |
| Commodities not elsewhere specified | 579,849 | 3 | Germany | 54,621 | 9.4% |
| Commodities not elsewhere specified | 579,849 | 4 | China | 45,926 | 7.9% |
| Commodities not elsewhere specified | 579,849 | 5 | Singapore | 35,535 | 6.1% |

== Top exporting countries by service category ==
The data is sourced from International Trade Centre. All data refer to the year 2022.

| Service category | Global exports (millions USD) | Rank | Country | Exports (millions USD) |
|---|---|---|---|---|
| All services | 6,949,792 | 1 | United States | 928,530 |
| All services | 6,949,792 | 2 | United Kingdom | 494,440 |
| All services | 6,949,792 | 3 | China | 424,056 |
| All services | 6,949,792 | 4 | Germany | 411,761 |
| All services | 6,949,792 | 5 | Ireland | 355,174 |
| Manufacturing services on physical inputs owned by others | 123,721 | 1 | China | 20,102 |
| Manufacturing services on physical inputs owned by others | 123,721 | 2 | Germany | 15,282 |
| Manufacturing services on physical inputs owned by others | 123,721 | 3 | France | 13,856 |
| Manufacturing services on physical inputs owned by others | 123,721 | 4 | Netherlands | 10,476 |
| Manufacturing services on physical inputs owned by others | 123,721 | 5 | Italy | 6,979 |
| Maintenance and repair services n.i.e. | 90,240 | 1 | United States | 14,468 |
| Maintenance and repair services n.i.e. | 90,240 | 2 | France | 12,712 |
| Maintenance and repair services n.i.e. | 90,240 | 3 | Germany | 12,075 |
| Maintenance and repair services n.i.e. | 90,240 | 4 | China | 8,434 |
| Maintenance and repair services n.i.e. | 90,240 | 5 | Singapore | 7,756 |
| Transport services (air transport, sea transport and others) | 1,423,146 | 1 | China | 148,761 |
| Transport services (air transport, sea transport and others) | 1,423,146 | 2 | Germany | 106,380 |
| Transport services (air transport, sea transport and others) | 1,423,146 | 3 | Singapore | 101,552 |
| Transport services (air transport, sea transport and others) | 1,423,146 | 4 | United States | 90,956 |
| Transport services (air transport, sea transport and others) | 1,423,146 | 5 | France | 86,574 |
| Travel services | 1,068,568 | 1 | United States | 136,869 |
| Travel services | 1,068,568 | 2 | Spain | 72,891 |
| Travel services | 1,068,568 | 3 | United Kingdom | 68,165 |
| Travel services | 1,068,568 | 4 | United Arab Emirates | 61,086 |
| Travel services | 1,068,568 | 5 | France | 59,676 |
| Construction services | 95,421 | 1 | China | 26,320 |
| Construction services | 95,421 | 2 | South Korea | 7,144 |
| Construction services | 95,421 | 3 | Japan | 7,037 |
| Construction services | 95,421 | 4 | Russia | 6,403 |
| Construction services | 95,421 | 5 | Denmark | 3,729 |
| Insurance and pension services | 173,795 | 1 | United Kingdom | 27,640 |
| Insurance and pension services | 173,795 | 2 | United States | 22,668 |
| Insurance and pension services | 173,795 | 3 | United Arab Emirates | 20,175 |
| Insurance and pension services | 173,795 | 4 | Ireland | 15,132 |
| Insurance and pension services | 173,795 | 5 | Germany | 13,428 |
| Financial services | 607,750 | 1 | United States | 167,726 |
| Financial services | 607,750 | 2 | United Kingdom | 89,451 |
| Financial services | 607,750 | 3 | Luxembourg | 69,086 |
| Financial services | 607,750 | 4 | Singapore | 39,793 |
| Financial services | 607,750 | 5 | Germany | 31,997 |
| Charges for the use of intellectual property | 441,917 | 1 | United States | 127,392 |
| Charges for the use of intellectual property | 441,917 | 2 | Germany | 48,293 |
| Charges for the use of intellectual property | 441,917 | 3 | Japan | 46,479 |
| Charges for the use of intellectual property | 441,917 | 4 | Netherlands | 38,517 |
| Charges for the use of intellectual property | 441,917 | 5 | Switzerland | 30,038 |
| ITC services and outsourcing | 916,487 | 1 | Ireland | 206,589 |
| ITC services and outsourcing | 916,487 | 2 | India | 99,233 |
| ITC services and outsourcing | 916,487 | 3 | China | 82,923 |
| ITC services and outsourcing | 916,487 | 4 | United States | 66,227 |
| ITC services and outsourcing | 916,487 | 5 | United Kingdom | 42,564 |
| Other business services | 1,667,139 | 1 | United States | 245,212 |
| Other business services | 1,667,139 | 2 | United Kingdom | 183,881 |
| Other business services | 1,667,139 | 3 | India | 120,490 |
| Other business services | 1,667,139 | 4 | China | 100,983 |
| Other business services | 1,667,139 | 5 | Germany | 98,808 |
| Personal, cultural, and recreational services | 100,631 | 1 | United States | 26,829 |
| Personal, cultural, and recreational services | 100,631 | 2 | Malta | 9,851 |
| Personal, cultural, and recreational services | 100,631 | 3 | Sweden | 7,342 |
| Personal, cultural, and recreational services | 100,631 | 4 | United Kingdom | 6,768 |
| Personal, cultural, and recreational services | 100,631 | 5 | Canada | 4,768 |
| Government goods and services n.i.e. | 77,010 | 1 | United States | 28,529 |
| Government goods and services n.i.e. | 77,010 | 2 | Germany | 5,559 |
| Government goods and services n.i.e. | 77,010 | 3 | Japan | 3,434 |
| Government goods and services n.i.e. | 77,010 | 4 | Egypt | 3,170 |
| Government goods and services n.i.e. | 77,010 | 5 | Bangladesh | 2,604 |

== See also ==
- List of countries by exports
- List of countries by exports per capita
- List of countries by imports
- List of countries by leading trade partners
- List of Chinese administrative divisions by exports
- List of U.S. states and territories by exports and imports
- List of German states by exports
- List of Indian states and union territories by exports
