= List of countries by service exports and imports =

The following list sorts countries and some territories by their exports and imports of services. According to the World Trade Organization (WTO), services refer to the cross-border sale or supply of services by residents of one country to residents of another country.

Services can include a wide range of activities such as transportation, tourism, telecommunications, financial and insurance services, computer and information services, business and professional services, and many others. The WTO defines services broadly to include all economic activities other than the production and trade of physical goods.

== List ==
Services exported and imported
| Country / territory | Exports (m USD) | Imports (m USD) | Exports - imports | Year |
|---|---|---|---|---|
| World | 8,828,677 | 8,024,504 | 804,173 | 2024 |
| United States | 1,107,359 | 812,204 | 295,155 | 2024 |
| United Kingdom | 649,278 | 401,774 | 247,504 | 2024 |
| Germany | 471,582 | 551,801 | -80,219 | 2024 |
| Ireland | 431,468 | 418,633 | 12,835 | 2023 |
| India | 421,300 | 204,420 | 216,880 | 2024 |
| France | 400,104 | 340,436 | 59,668 | 2024 |
| Singapore | 395,566 | 351,122 | 44,444 | 2024 |
| China | 383,960 | 612,978 | -229,018 | 2024 |
| Netherlands | 309,268 | 268,042 | 41,226 | 2024 |
| Japan | 227,965 | 246,310 | -18,345 | 2024 |
| Spain | 220,372 | 111,559 | 108,813 | 2024 |
| Switzerland | 179,835 | 214,617 | -34,782 | 2024 |
| Luxembourg | 171,242 | 130,659 | 40,583 | 2024 |
| Canada | 159,075 | 160,061 | -986 | 2024 |
| Italy | 155,271 | 162,798 | -7,527 | 2024 |
| Belgium | 148,182 | 158,993 | -10,811 | 2024 |
| South Korea | 138,953 | 162,654 | -23,701 | 2024 |
| Denmark | 127,109 | 121,197 | 5,912 | 2024 |
| Poland | 118,714 | 75,176 | 42,644 | 2024 |
| Sweden | 116,828 | 124,965 | -8,108 | 2024 |
| Turkey | 115,249 | 53,257 | 61,992 | 2024 |
| Hong Kong | 108,763 | 90,279 | 18,484 | 2024 |
| Austria | 94,303 | 87,984 | 5,902 | 2024 |
| Australia | 83,386 | 108,665 | -25,279 | 2024 |
| Israel | 83,042 | 43,908 | 39,478 | 2024 |
| Thailand | 72,142 | 73,643 | -1,501 | 2024 |
| Mexico | 63,034 | 71,056 | -8,022 | 2024 |
| Portugal | 62,299 | 27,707 | 34,592 | 2024 |
| Norway | 56,850 | 64,210 | -7,360 | 2024 |
| Greece | 55,809 | 31,213 | 24,596 | 2024 |
| Saudi Arabia | 55,277 | 101,665 | -46,388 | 2024 |
| Malaysia | 53,402 | 56,370 | -2,968 | 2024 |
| Philippines | 51,978 | 37,398 | 14,580 | 2024 |
| Brazil | 48,477 | 103,036 | -54,559 | 2024 |
| Romania | 42,933 | 30,648 | 12,285 | 2024 |
| Czech Republic | 42,539 | 38,018 | 4,521 | 2024 |
| Russia | 42,186 | 81,326 | -39,140 | 2024 |
| Finland | 41,219 | 46,726 | -5,507 | 2024 |
| Indonesia | 39,029 | 57,511 | -18,482 | 2024 |
| Hungary | 38,303 | 27,394 | 10,909 | 2024 |
| Macao | 36,184 | 5,437 | 30,748 | 2023 |
| Egypt | 33,649 | 22,005 | 11,643 | 2023 |
| Cyprus | 30,725 | 22,003 | 8,722 | 2024 |
| Qatar | 30,172 | 37,085 | -6,913 | 2024 |
| Morocco | 25,451 | 12,351 | 13,100 | 2023 |
| Croatia | 24,694 | 8,348 | 16,346 | 2024 |
| Malta | 24,663 | 17,200 | 7,463 | 2024 |
| Lithuania | 24,197 | 14,683 | 9,514 | 2024 |
| Vietnam | 23,851 | 36,183 | -12,332 | 2024 |
| New Zealand | 18,505 | 19,467 | -962 | 2024 |
| Panama | 18,267 | 5,746 | 12,521 | 2024 |
| Colombia | 17,780 | 18,386 | -606 | 2024 |
| Ukraine | 17,226 | 22,734 | -5,508 | 2024 |
| Argentina | 17,122 | 22,598 | -5,476 | 2024 |
| Bulgaria | 16,626 | 8,205 | 8,421 | 2024 |
| South Africa | 15,939 | 19,761 | -3,822 | 2024 |
| Serbia | 15,650 | 12,623 | 3,027 | 2024 |
| Bahrain | 15,530 | 12,063 | 3,468 | 2023 |
| Costa Rica | 14,797 | 6,368 | 8,429 | 2023 |
| Dominican Republic | 14,691 | 5,632 | 9,059 | 2024 |
| Slovakia | 13,562 | 12,343 | 1,219 | 2024 |
| Slovenia | 13,522 | 9,591 | 3,931 | 2024 |
| Estonia | 13,514 | 9,857 | 2,816 | 2023 |
| Chile | 11,957 | 21,106 | -9,149 | 2024 |
| Kazakhstan | 11,828 | 13,049 | -1,221 | 2024 |
| Kuwait | 11,302 | 30,402 | -19,101 | 2023 |
| Tunisia | 10,694 | 3,863 | 6,831 | 2024 |
| Belarus | 9,889 | 6,482 | 3,407 | 2024 |
| Jordan | 9,634 | 6,004 | 3,630 | 2023 |
| Iraq | 8,703 | 25,227 | -16,524 | 2023 |
| Ghana | 8,662 | 12,015 | -3,353 | 2023 |
| Latvia | 8,124 | 5,756 | 2,368 | 2023 |
| Azerbaijan | 8,121 | 10,171 | -2,050 | 2024 |
| Pakistan | 8,097 | 11,168 | -3,071 | 2024 |
| Albania | 8,031 | 3,829 | 4,202 | 2024 |
| Lebanon | 7,922 | 6,626 | 1,296 | 2023 |
| Georgia | 7,700 | 3,822 | 3,878 | 2024 |
| Ethiopia | 7,396 | 7,633 | -237 | 2023 |
| Syria | 7,333 | 3,533 | 3,800 | 2010 |
| Peru | 7,153 | 15,069 | -7,916 | 2024 |
| Uruguay | 6,948 | 6,206 | 742 | 2024 |
| Iceland | 6,898 | 5,002 | 1,896 | 2024 |
| Myanmar | 6,683 | 3,665 | 3,018 | 2019 |
| Bangladesh | 6,652 | 11,313 | -4,661 | 2024 |
| Uzbekistan | 6,547 | 10,464 | -3,917 | 2024 |
| Tanzania | 6,284 | 2,330 | 3,954 | 2023 |
| El Salvador | 6,000 | 3,259 | 2,741 | 2024 |
| Oman | 5,735 | 12,243 | -6,508 | 2023 |
| Armenia | 5,682 | 3,847 | 1,835 | 2024 |
| Sri Lanka | 5,416 | 2,012 | 3,404 | 2023 |
| Kenya | 5,405 | 4,803 | 602 | 2023 |
| Jamaica | 5,256 | 3,457 | 1,799 | 2024 |
| Bahamas | 5,144 | 2,198 | 2,946 | 2023 |
| Maldives | 5,030 | 1,885 | 3,145 | 2024 |
| Guatemala | 4,668 | 6,445 | -1,777 | 2024 |
| Nigeria | 4,441 | 17,677 | -13,236 | 2023 |
| Ecuador | 4,203 | 6,144 | -1,940 | 2023 |
| Cambodia | 4,188 | 2,870 | 1,318 | 2023 |
| Mauritius | 4,086 | 2,132 | 1,954 | 2023 |
| Cayman Islands | 4,046 | 1,679 | 2,367 | 2022 |
| Algeria | 3,877 | 8,279 | -4,403 | 2023 |
| Honduras | 3,661 | 3,448 | 212 | 2023 |
| Bosnia and Herzegovina | 3,555 | 1,125 | 2,430 | 2023 |
| Kosovo | 3,214 | 1,448 | 1,766 | 2023 |
| Montenegro | 2,995 | 1,162 | 1,833 | 2023 |
| Aruba | 2,989 | 1,180 | 1,809 | 2023 |
| Andorra | 2,933 | 834 | 2,099 | 2023 |
| North Macedonia | 2,867 | 2,076 | 791 | 2023 |
| Paraguay | 2,455 | 2,475 | -20 | 2023 |
| Moldova | 2,441 | 1,546 | 895 | 2023 |
| Uganda | 2,081 | 3,700 | -1,619 | 2023 |
| Cameroon | 2,008 | 2,554 | -545 | 2023 |
| Seychelles | 1,833 | 1,010 | 823 | 2023 |
| Mongolia | 1,587 | 4,179 | -2,592 | 2023 |
| Nicaragua | 1,561 | 1,137 | 424 | 2023 |
| Sudan | 1,551 | 1,590 | -39 | 2022 |
| Curaçao | 1,546 | 935 | 612 | 2023 |
| Barbados | 1,523 | 687 | 836 | 2017 |
| Senegal | 1,480 | 4,075 | -2,595 | 2023 |
| Iran | 1,382 | 2,296 | -914 | 2000 |
| Kyrgyzstan | 1,375 | 1,483 | -109 | 2022 |
| Fiji | 1,329 | 754 | 574 | 2022 |
| Laos | 1,327 | 947 | 380 | 2023 |
| Venezuela | 1,285 | 9,472 | -8,187 | 2016 |
| Saint Lucia | 1,275 | 540 | 736 | 2023 |
| Sint Maarten | 1,273 | 330 | 943 | 2023 |
| Trinidad and Tobago | 1,166 | 2,157 | -991 | 2023 |
| Madagascar | 1,142 | 1,524 | -382 | 2022 |
| Mozambique | 1,128 | 2,000 | -872 | 2023 |
| Bermuda | 1,126 | 840 | 287 | 2021 |
| Bolivia | 1,111 | 2,456 | -1,345 | 2023 |
| Djibouti | 1,105 | 787 | 318 | 2023 |
| Antigua and Barbuda | 1,100 | 530 | 570 | 2023 |
| Belize | 1,048 | 308 | 740 | 2023 |
| Rwanda | 1,043 | 948 | 95 | 2023 |
| Namibia | 1,043 | 2,002 | -959 | 2023 |
| French Polynesia | 1,024 | 384 | 640 | 2016 |
| Zambia | 933 | 1,706 | -773 | 2023 |
| Ivory Coast | 913 | 4,725 | -3,812 | 2022 |
| Nepal | 894 | 2,051 | -1,156 | 2023 |
| San Marino | 891 | 849 | 42 | 2022 |
| Palestine | 890 | 1,993 | -1,103 | 2023 |
| Turks and Caicos Islands | 821 | 74 | 747 | 2018 |
| Grenada | 755 | 390 | 365 | 2023 |
| Cape Verde | 716 | 278 | 437 | 2023 |
| Afghanistan | 700 | 1,105 | -406 | 2020 |
| Botswana | 641 | 1,015 | -374 | 2023 |
| Burkina Faso | 621 | 1,450 | -829 | 2023 |
| Benin | 552 | 940 | -388 | 2022 |
| Saint Kitts and Nevis | 551 | 294 | 257 | 2023 |
| New Caledonia | 540 | 1,109 | -569 | 2016 |
| Guyana | 529 | 4,954 | -4,425 | 2023 |
| Togo | 514 | 438 | 76 | 2020 |
| South Sudan | 484 | 2,192 | -1,707 | 2023 |
| Mali | 475 | 2,336 | -1,861 | 2023 |
| Malawi | 475 | 998 | -524 | 2023 |
| Yemen | 466 | 1,458 | -992 | 2016 |
| Zimbabwe | 399 | 1,637 | -1,237 | 2023 |
| Gambia | 357 | 153 | 204 | 2023 |
| Brunei | 340 | 1,642 | -1,302 | 2023 |
| Chad | 340 | 199 | 141 | 1994 |
| Papua New Guinea | 307 | 2,170 | -1,862 | 2023 |
| Samoa | 303 | 132 | 171 | 2023 |
| Saint Vincent and the Grenadines | 296 | 187 | 109 | 2023 |
| Mauritania | 295 | 956 | -660 | 2023 |
| Gabon | 277 | 852 | -575 | 2015 |
| Tajikistan | 244 | 748 | -505 | 2023 |
| Republic of the Congo | 240 | 1,707 | -1,467 | 2021 |
| Niger | 231 | 1,219 | -988 | 2023 |
| Faroe Islands | 207 | 394 | -187 | 2011 |
| Liberia | 192 | 434 | -242 | 2022 |
| Suriname | 173 | 631 | -458 | 2023 |
| Dominica | 163 | 152 | 11 | 2023 |
| Eswatini | 145 | 489 | -344 | 2023 |
| Guinea | 143 | 3,283 | -3,140 | 2023 |
| Haiti | 139 | 588 | -449 | 2023 |
| Bhutan | 127 | 323 | -196 | 2023 |
| Burundi | 119 | 365 | -246 | 2023 |
| Comoros | 116 | 205 | -89 | 2023 |
| Solomon Islands | 115 | 254 | -139 | 2023 |
| Libya | 83 | 8,449 | -8,366 | 2021 |
| Tonga | 82 | 150 | -68 | 2023 |
| Vanuatu | 78 | 230 | -151 | 2022 |
| Angola | 76 | 8,603 | -8,527 | 2023 |
| São Tomé and Príncipe | 75 | 55 | 21 | 2022 |
| Timor-Leste | 69 | 422 | -353 | 2023 |
| Eritrea | 61 | 28 | 32 | 2000 |
| Democratic Republic of the Congo | 49 | 5,680 | -5,631 | 2023 |
| Sierra Leone | 43 | 348 | -305 | 2023 |
| Federated States of Micronesia | 38 | 77 | -39 | 2014 |
| Guinea-Bissau | 35 | 179 | -144 | 2022 |
| Central African Republic | 33 | 114 | -81 | 1994 |
| Nauru | 33 | 61 | -28 | 2023 |
| Palau | 22 | 58 | -36 | 2022 |
| Lesotho | 17 | 415 | -398 | 2023 |
| Marshall Islands | 9 | 73 | -64 | 2021 |
| Kiribati | 9 | 101 | -92 | 2023 |
| Equatorial Guinea | 5 | 185 | -180 | 1996 |
| Tuvalu | 2 | 33 | -31 | 2022 |

== See also ==
- List of countries by exports per capita
- List of countries by exports
- List of countries by merchandise exports
- List of countries by imports
- List of countries by leading trade partners
