= List of countries by merchandise exports =

The following article lists countries and territories by their merchandise exports according to data from the World Bank and other sources. Merchandise exports are goods that are produced in one country and sold to another country. Only physical objects are counted. For example, cars, clothing, machinery, and agricultural products are merchandise exports. Exports of services are excluded.

== List ==
The table initially ranks each country or territory with their latest available merchandise or goods export values, and can be reranked (sort by ascending or descending) by any of the sources.

Merchandise exports (US$ million) by country
Country/Territory	Region	United Nations		WTO		World Bank	
Country/Territory	Region	Exports	Year	Exports	Year	Exports	Year
World	—	24,486,780	2022-23	22,487,000	2021-22	24,314,334	2022-23
China	Asia	3,388,716	(Note: The United Nations figures exclude Taiwan, and the special administrative regions of Hong Kong and Macau.)2023	3,153,601	2022	3,179,193	(Note: The World Bank figures exclude the special administrative regions of Hong Kong and Macau.)2023
United States	Americas	2,019,160	2023	2,064,787	2022	2,045,220	2023
Germany	Europe	1,702,362	2023	1,655,480	2022	1,694,135	2023
Netherlands	Europe	741,804	2023	612,852	2022	731,871	2023
Japan	Asia	719,844	2023	765,518	2022	713,824	2023
France	Europe	718,525	2023	634,817	2022	679,670	2023
Italy	Europe	677,095	2023	603,585	2022	645,564	2023
South Korea	Asia	632,225	2023	626,920	2022	645,048	2023
India	Asia	581,997	2023	494,025	2021	435,652	2023
Mexico	Americas	576,144	2023	500,225	2021	593,573	2023
Belgium	Europe	568,505	2023	395,400	2021	614,703	2022
Canada	Americas	568,413	2022	597,480	2022	569,147	2023
United Kingdom	Europe	519,684	2023	625,325	2023	628,856	2023
Singapore	Asia	475,473	2023	395,400	2021-22	545,938	2023
Vietnam	Asia	453,694	2023	335,929	2021	354,671	2023
Taiwan	Asia	432,956	(Note: The name used in United Nations's report is "Taipei, Chinese".)2023	447,693	2021	—	2022
Hong Kong	Asia	431,418	2023	457,357	2021	574,617	2023
Switzerland	Europe	420,657	2023	379,885	2021	489,089	2023
Spain	Europe	420,169	2023	384,459	2021	412,060	2022
Russia	Europe	407,853	2023	529,435	2022	508,364	2022
Australia	Oceania	370,869	2023	343,594	2021	371,768	2023
Poland	Europe	354,667	2023	337,908	2021	361,247	2023
Brazil	Americas	339,695	2023	280,815	2021	344,432	2023
Malaysia	Asia	312,964	2023	299,028	2021	268,280	2022
Saudi Arabia	Asia	304,500	2023	258,400	2021	410,676	2022
United Arab Emirates	Asia	279,917	2023	425,042	2021	—	
Thailand	Asia	280,087	2023	271,174	2021	285,375	2022
Indonesia	Asia	258,797	2023	229,850	2021	292,538	2022
Turkey	Europe	254,171	2023	225,291	2021	250,830	2023
Czech Republic	Europe	253,327	2023	226,409	2021	196,981	2023
Austria	Europe	222,185	2023	202,081	2021	216,780	2023
Ireland	Europe	212,869	2023	190,157	2021	334,222	2023
Sweden	Europe	197,797	2023	189,654	2021	215,929	2022
Norway	Europe	177,454	2023	159,498	2021	270,459	2022
Hungary	Europe	158,075	2023	141,727	2021	130,865	2022
Denmark	Europe	136,074	2023	124,756	2021	147,705	2022
Slovakia	Europe	117,062	2023	103,620	2021	101,643	2022
South Africa	Africa	110,662	2023	123,572	2021	123,357	2022
Iraq	Asia	108,413	2023	131,766	2022	73,083	2021
Chile	Americas	100,290	2023	94,705	2021	98,548	2022
Romania	Europe	100,642	2023	87,716	2021	65,870	2022
Qatar	Asia	100,092	2023	86,675	2021	130,965	2022
Kuwait	Asia	90,476	2022	71,436	2021	40,248	2020
Argentina	Americas	88,268	2022	77,935	2021	88,515	2022
Finland	Europe	86,062	2022	81,595	2021	91,892	2022
Kazakhstan	Asia	84,391	2022	60,625	2021	86,129	2022
Portugal	Europe	82,354	2022	75,064	2021	73,416	2021
Oman	Asia	80,322	2022	53,671	2021	30,506	2020
Philippines	Asia	78,929	2022	74,609	2021	57,448	2022
Israel	Asia	73,583	2022	59,429	2021	80,032	2022
Algeria	Africa	66,736	2022	36,700	2021	65,080	2022
Bangladesh	Asia	65,970	2022	44,223	2021	51,868	2022
Nigeria	Africa	63,338	2022	46,117	2021	64,227	2022
Peru	Americas	58,172	2022	63,106	2021	66,235	2022
Greece	Europe	57,568	2022	47,124	2021	56,191	2022
Slovenia	Europe	55,479	2022	56,950	2021	41,759	2021
Angola	Africa	51,269	2022	33,337	2021	50,038	2022
Bulgaria	Europe	50,250	2022	40,861	2021	31,160	2020
Egypt	Africa	48,148	2022	49,277	2022	64,227	2022
Lithuania	Europe	46,502	2022	40,821	2021	43,138	2022
Ukraine	Europe	44,443	(Note: Figures exclude the Republic of Crimea and Sevastopol.)2022	68,075	2021	40,912	2022
New Zealand	Oceania	43,997	2022	44,867	2021	46,183	2022
Morocco	Africa	42,331	2022	35,843	(Note: Includes Western Sahara.)2021	36,574	2022
Libya	Africa	39,505	2022	25,697	2021	27,733	2019
Colombia	Americas	38,950	2022	40,287	2021	42,734	2021
Azerbaijan	Asia	38,146	2022	21,697	2021	40,868	2022
Ecuador	Americas	35,380	2022	26,969	2021	33,451	2022
Pakistan	Asia	31,175	2022	28,320	2021	29,050	2021
DR Congo	Africa	29,518	(Note: The name used in United Nations's report is "Congo, Democratic Republic of the".)2022	19,900	2021	22,185	(Note: The name used in the World Bank's report is "Congo, Dem. Rep.")2021
Serbia	Europe	28,565	2022	25,564	2021	28,296	2022
Croatia	Europe	25,383	2022	22,662	2021	21,435	2022
Estonia	Europe	23,146	2022	21,521	2021	19,253	2021
Latvia	Europe	22,525	2022	20,902	2021	19,175	2021
Bahrain	Asia	22,252	2022	23,230	2021	18,043	2018
Cambodia	Asia	20,576	2022	17,971	2021	23,179	2022
Tunisia	Africa	19,871	2022	16,689	2021	13,834	2020
Myanmar	Asia	17,085	2021	15,449	2021	10,840	2019
Papua New Guinea	Oceania	16,890	2022	10,969	2021	11,446	2021
Luxembourg	Europe	16,810	2021	16,581	2021	28,978	2022
Ivory Coast	Africa	16,395	(Note: The name used in United Nations's report is "Côte d'Ivoire".)2022	15,333	2021	15,320	2021
Ghana	Africa	16,258	2022	17,000	2021	14,727	2021
Guatemala	Americas	15,806	2022	13,727	2021	12,413	2021
Iran	Asia	15,597	2022	72,345	2021	28,345	2000
Panama	Americas	15,467	2022	6,739	2021	16,690	2021
Costa Rica	Americas	15,319	2022	15,318	2021	16,302	2022
Uzbekistan	Asia	15,287	2022	14,063	2021	17,110	2022
Brunei	Asia	14,238	(Note: The name used in United Nations's report is "Brunei Darussalam".)2022	11,065	2021	14,130	2022
Turkmenistan	Asia	14,227	2022	7,815	2021	—	
Bolivia	Americas	13,653	(Note: The name used in United Nations's report is "Bolivia, Plurinational State of".)2022	11,030	2021	13,528	2022
Trinidad and Tobago	Americas	13,220	2022	8,619	2021	6,002	2020
Honduras	Americas	13,179	2022	10,202	2021	4,291	2020
Sri Lanka	Asia	12,770	2022	12,502	2021	10,047	2020
Mongolia	Asia	12,558	2022	9,247	2021	9,854	2022
Dominican Republic	Americas	12,390	2022	12,410	2021	13,777	2022
Zambia	Africa	11,690	2022	11,100	2021	11,505	2022
Uruguay	Americas	11,190	2022	9,507	2021	17,156	2022
Congo	Africa	11,110	2022	6,970	2021	4,435	2020
Belarus	Europe	10,975	2022	39,990	2021	37,566	2022
Equatorial Guinea	Africa	10,107	2022	5,100	2021	175	1996
Paraguay	Americas	9,954	2022	10,547	2021	10,955	2020
Laos	Asia	9,159	2022	7,620	2021	7,694	(Note: The name used in the World Bank's report is "Lao PDR".)2021
Bosnia and Herzegovina	Europe	9,678	2022	8,614	2021	8,685	2022
Gabon	Africa	9,012	2022	6,323	2021	5,112	2015
Jordan	Asia	8,790	2022	9,375	2021	7,943	2020
North Macedonia	Europe	8,729	2022	7,516	2021	7,091	2021
Guinea	Africa	8,606	2022	10,440	2021	8,931	2020
Botswana	Africa	8,277	2022	7,095	2021	7,414	2021
Mozambique	Africa	8,199	2022	5,579	2021	8,281	2022
Guyana	Americas	7,866	2022	4,295	2021	4,356	2021
Iceland	Europe	7,424	2022	5,957	2021	6,012	2021
Kenya	Africa	7,391	2022	6,739	2021	6,789	2021
Nicaragua	Americas	7,360	2022	6,544	2021	4,395	2020
Cameroon	Africa	7,258	2022	4,115	2021	4,415	2020
El Salvador	Americas	7,115	2022	6,629	2021	4,158	2020
Tanzania	Africa	6,825	(Note: The United Nations' figure excludes the autonomous region of Zanzibar.)2022	6,354	2021	6,371	2020
Namibia	Africa	6,005	2022	6,642	2021	4,154	2022
Senegal	Africa	5,725	2022	5,091	2021	3,866	2018
Armenia	Asia	5,307	2022	3,023	2021	5,521	2022
Venezuela	Americas	4,763	2022	3,555	2021	27,399	2016
Burkina Faso	Africa	4,549	2022	4,797	2021	4,846	2020
Cyprus	Europe	4,411	(Note: Data are for the area controlled by the Government of the Republic of Cyprus.)2022	3,778	2021	3,372	2020
Moldova	Europe	4,335	(Note: Excludes data for Transnistria.)2022	3,144	2021	1,944	2020
Albania	Europe	4,306	2022	3,559	2021	2,037	2022
Georgia	Asia	3,887	(Note: Excludes Abkhazia and South Ossetia.)2022	4,242	2021	4,346	2020
Lebanon	Asia	3,862	2022	4,274	2021	3,819	2020
Chad	Africa	3,857	2022	2,560	2021	135	1994
Mauritania	Africa	3,778	2022	3,509	2021	2,590	2020
Madagascar	Africa	3,509	2022	2,742	2021	1,948	2020
Malta	Europe	3,269	2022	3,102	2021	3,383	2020
Sudan	Africa	3,164	2022	4,300	2021	4,357	2022
Ethiopia	Africa	3,083	2022	4,011	2021	3,970	2022
New Caledonia	Oceania	3,058	2022	1,696	2021	1,335	2016
Uganda	Africa	2,990	2022	4,200	2021	4,494	2021
Zimbabwe	Africa	2,814	2022	5,921	2021	4,931	2020
Suriname	Americas	2,579	2022	2,203	2021	2,343	2020
Eswatini	Africa	2,383	2022	2,260	2021	1,739	2020
Cayman Islands	Americas	2,190	2022	27	2021	356	2019
Kyrgyzstan	Asia	2,187	2022	1,659	2021	2,007	2020
Mali	Africa	2,034	2022	5,015	2021	4,794	2020
Cuba	Americas	1,901	2022	1,548	2021	—	
Yemen	Asia	1,711	2022	1,871	2021	472	2016
Tajikistan	Asia	1,786	2021	1,967	2021	1,270	2020
Nepal	Asia	1,646	2021	1,979	2021	1,720	2021
Faroe Islands	Europe	1,626	2021	2,481	2020	1,005	2011
Afghanistan	Asia	1,574	2022	1,007	2021	776	2020
Marshall Islands	Oceania	1,562	2022	80	2021	86	2018
Greenland	Americas	1,533	2022	801	2021	3,052	2018
Rwanda	Africa	1,435	2022	1,251	2021	2,111	2022
Mauritius	Africa	1,380	2022	1,964	2021	1,788	2020
Macau	Asia	1,367	(Note: The name used in the United Nations' report is "Macao SAR".)2022	1,620	2021	4,249	(Note: The name used in the World Bank's report is "Macao SAR, China".)2020
Togo	Africa	1,351	2022	1,040	2021	1,207	2020
Sierra Leone	Africa	1,303	2022	663	2021	647	2020
Haiti	Americas	1,302	2022	960	2021	1,130	2021
Fiji	Oceania	1,070	2022	874	2021	819	2020
Malawi	Africa	941	2022	874	2021	911	2020
Jamaica	Americas	849	2022	1,343	2021	1,218	2020
Benin	Africa	833	2022	3,684	2021	2,995	2020
Lesotho	Africa	817	2022	1,052	2021	1,064	2021
Montenegro	Europe	736	2022	515	2021	808	2022
Seychelles	Africa	657	2022	414	2021	419	2020
Syria	Asia	612	2022	900	2021	12,272	2010
Djibouti	Africa	604	2022	3,282	2021	2,784	2020
Eritrea	Africa	575	2022	600	2021	36	2000
Solomon Islands	Oceania	574	2022	371	2021	378	2020
Bahamas	Americas	574	2022	901	2021	389	2020
Barbados	Americas	498	2022	340	2021	976	2016
South Sudan	Africa	448	2022	15,903	2020	2,190	2020
Niger	Africa	446	2022	1,229	2021	1,115	2020
Gibraltar	Europe	412	2022	—		—	
Falkland Islands	Americas	403	2022	—		855	2020
Bhutan	Asia	399	2022	886	2021	651	2020
Andorra	Europe	386	2022	148	2021	129	2019
Curaçao	Americas	365	2022	303	2021	270	2020
British Virgin Islands	Americas	353	2022	1,492	2020	—	
Tokelau	Oceania	347	2022	—		—	
North Korea	Asia	295	2022	135	2021	—	
Timor-Leste	Asia	273	2021	616	2021	17	(Note: The name used in the World Bank's report is "East-Timor".)2020
Belize	Americas	286	2022	316	2021	289	2020
Bermuda	Americas	224	2021	8	2021	10	2020
Vanuatu	Oceania	223	2022	53	2021	46	2020
Nauru	Oceania	222	2022	120	2021	11	2018
Guinea-Bissau	Africa	222	2022	308	2021	213	2020
Liberia	Africa	203	2022	760	2021	542	2019
Micronesia	Oceania	201	2022	71	2021	88	2014
Burundi	Africa	189	2022	103	2021	180	2018
Gambia	Africa	184	2022	33	2021	31	2021
United States Minor Outlying Islands	Oceania	181	2022	—		—	
Maldives	Asia	151	2021	285	2021	257	2020
French Polynesia	Oceania	146	2022	119	2021	177	2016
Somalia	Africa	124	2022	—		—	
Kiribati	Oceania	124	2022	10	2021	9	2020
Central African Republic	Africa	118	2022	162	2021	145	1994
Palestine	Asia	115	2022	—		1,715	(Note: The name used in the World Bank's report is "West Bank and Gaza".)2020
Aruba	Americas	105	2022	151	2021	89	2018
Tuvalu	Oceania	80	2022	—		0.50	2019
Saint Kitts and Nevis	Americas	66	2021	67	2021	28	2020
Comoros	Africa	62	2022	38	2021	22	2020
Saint Lucia	Americas	62	2022	—		60	2020
Samoa	Oceania	54	2022	29	2021	38	2020
Turks and Caicos Islands	Americas	50	2022	4	2021	5	2018
Saint Vincent and the Grenadines	Americas	44	2022	67	2021	58	2020
Cape Verde	Africa	42	2022	54	2021	123	(Note: The name used in the World Bank's report is "Cabo Verde".)2020
Saint Helena	Africa	42	2022	76	2021	—	
Grenada	Americas	37	2022	35	2021	28	2020
Cook Islands	Oceania	36	2022	22	2021	—	
Dominica	Americas	26	2022	19	2021	15	2020
French Southern and Antarctic Lands	Africa	24	2022	—		—	
São Tomé and Príncipe	Africa	23	2022	19	2021	13	2020
Antigua and Barbuda	Americas	22	2022	19	2021	34	2020
Christmas Island	Oceania	16	2022	—		—	
Tonga	Oceania	13	2022	22	2021	17	2020
Anguilla	Americas	13	2022	14	2021	—	
Sint Maarten	Americas	11	2022	139	2021	134	2020
Saint Pierre and Miquelon	Americas	9	2022	4	2021	—	
Palau	Oceania	8	2022	3	2021	9	2017
Niue	Oceania	7	2022	1	2021	—	
Montserrat	Americas	7	2021	14	2021	—	
Caribbean Netherlands	Americas	6	2022	1	2021	—	
Pitcairn Islands	Oceania	6	2021	—		—	
British Indian Ocean Territory	Africa	6	2022	—		—	
Northern Mariana Islands	Oceania	3	2022	—		—	
Cocos (Keeling) Islands	Oceania	3	2022	—		—	
Norfolk Island	Oceania	2	2022	—		—	
Wallis and Futuna	Oceania	0.5	2022	—		—	
Western Sahara	Africa	0.4	2022	—		—	
Kosovo	Europe	—		—		980	2022
American Samoa	Oceania	—		412	2021	—	
Guam	Oceania	—		44	2021	—	
Northern Mariana Islands	Oceania	—		6	2021	—	

== See also ==
- List of countries by exports
- List of countries by exports per capita
- List of countries by imports
- List of countries by leading trade partners
- List of Chinese administrative divisions by exports
- List of U.S. states and territories by exports and imports
- List of German states by exports
- List of countries by oil exports
