= Open to Export =

Online information service for small UK businesses

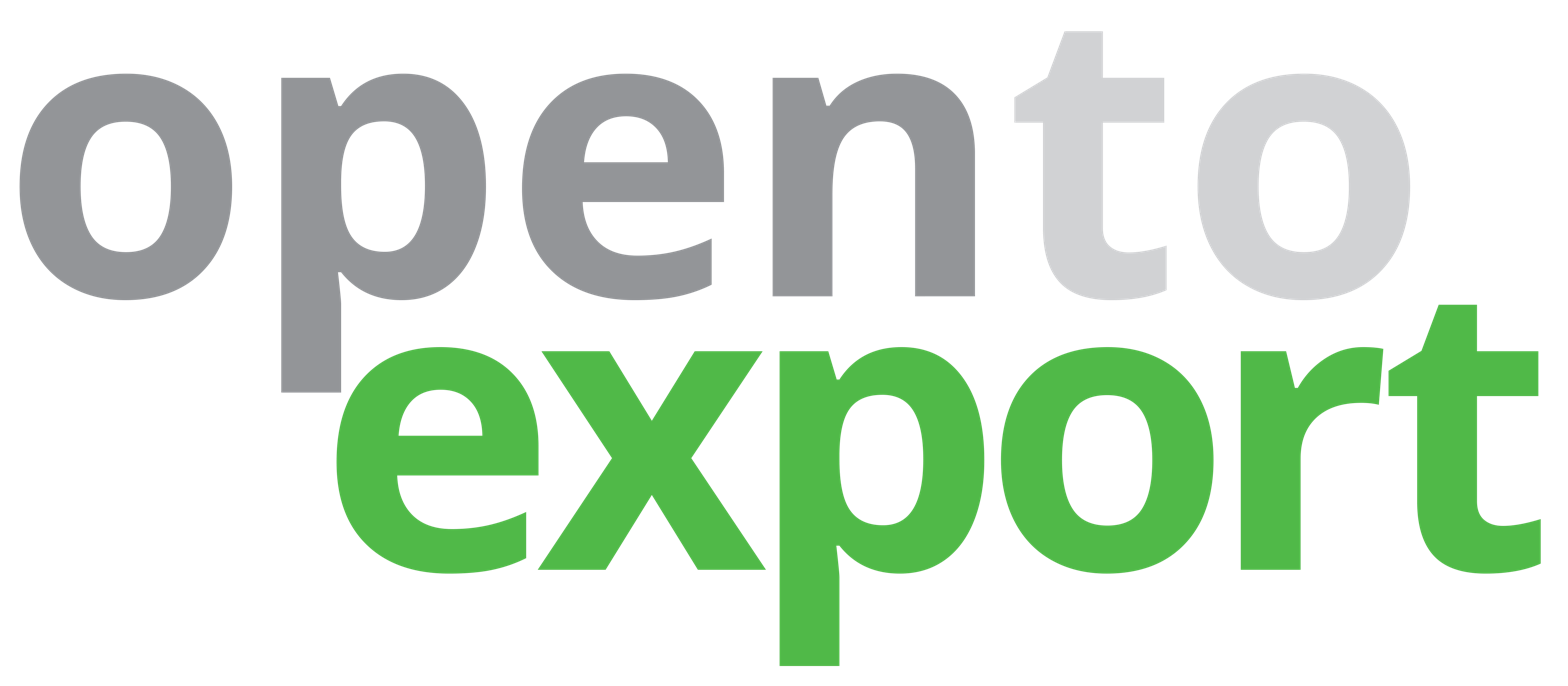
The logo of Open to Export

Open to Export is a free online information service from The Institute of Export & International Trade. It is solely dedicated to helping small UK businesses get ready to export and expand internationally.

== History ==
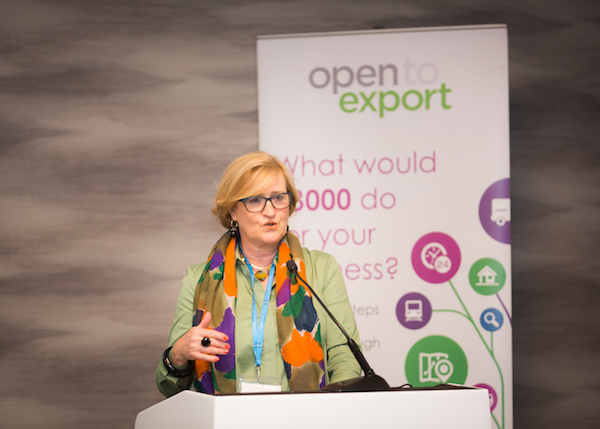
Lesley Batchelor, CEO of Open to Export, compering an 'Export Action Plan Competition.

The site launched in beta in May 2012; during this time Open to Export limited the business sectors to technology, and the overseas markets to the US and India.

The site officially launched in October 2012. At the time of launch, Lord Green, then Minister of State for Trade and Investment, said: "Supporting more small and medium-sized enterprises to export is a key part of the government's plan for growth," and went on to say "Half of the UK's exports, by value, already come from SMEs. Open to Export will provide practical assistance, advice and support to other businesses looking to make that crucial first step to sell into foreign markets."

Ownership of Open to Export was taken on by the Institute of Export & International Trade in April 2017.

== Export Action Plan ==
The 'Export Action Plan' is an online planning tool on Open to Export that sets goals for businesses along the five simple steps to export success, from getting started to delivery and documentation. Once completed, the company can download a PDF report of their export strategy, which they can take to their bank, adviser, or submit to Open to Export's quarterly competitions.

=== Export Action Plan Competitions ===
Open to Export runs quarterly competitions encouraging businesses to complete their 'Export Action Plans'. 10 finalists are invited to a showcase final, with one winner being selected by a panel of expert judges to win a cash prize and further support prizes towards the implementation of their plans.

Open to Export has run eight UK-only competitions and one global competition – the 'Open to Export International Business Awards'. The Open to Export International Business Awards were run with the support of the World Trade Organisation and the International Chamber of Commerce. The Institute of Export & International Trade were named a 'Small Business Champion' by the WTO and ICC upon the completion of the competition.

The 10th Export Action Plan competition was opened in November 2019.

Previous winners include: Charles Farris, Klick2Learn, Lick Frozen Yogurt, First Chop Brewing Arm, Genevieve Sweeney, The Great British Baby Company, Bubblebum (UK) Ltd, and Dytech Limited (Zambia).

== See also ==
- Export
- Trade
- International trade
- List of countries by exports
