= List of countries by exports =

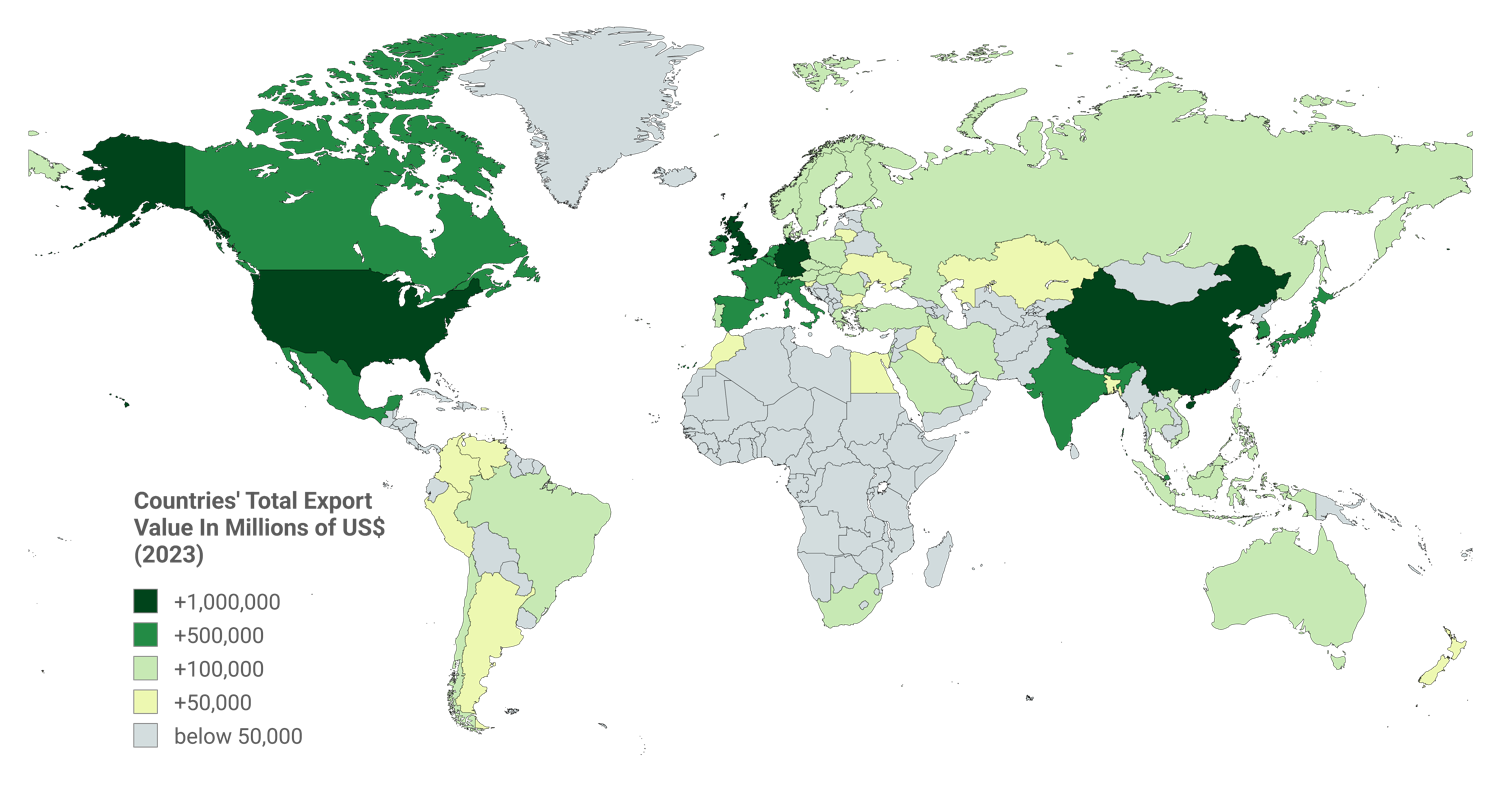
Map of countries by exports, 2023

This list of countries and territories by their exports, including both merchandise exports and service exports, is based on data from the World Bank. Merchandise exports are goods that are produced in one country and sold to another country. Service exports refer to the cross-border sale or supply of services by residents of one country to residents of another country. Some countries have significantly high export figures relative to their economy's size (i.e. Netherlands, Singapore and UAE) due to their high amount of re-exports.

== By total exports ==
Exports of goods and services (US$ million) by country
Country	Exports	Year	Top goods export
China	4,136,835	2025	Broadcasting equipment
United States	3,429,815	2025	Petroleum
Germany	2,047,926	2025	Cars
United Kingdom	1,225,513	2025	Gold
France	1,136,323	2025	Packaged medications
Netherlands	1,079,499	2025	Petroleum
Singapore	1,073,991	2025	Integrated circuits
Japan	971,285	2025	Cars
Ireland	961,839	2025	Serums and vaccines
South Korea	869,086	2025	Integrated circuits
India	863,100	2025	Petroleum
Hong Kong (CN)	853,825	2025	Integrated circuits
Italy	823,816	2025	Packaged medications
Switzerland	817,414	2025	Gold
United Arab Emirates	752,450	2025	Petroleum
Mexico	730,829	2025	Cars
Canada	726,630	2025	Petroleum
Spain	699,338	2025	Cars
Taiwan	664,506	2025	Integrated circuits
Belgium	550,008	2025	Vaccines
Poland	521,445	2025	Car parts
Vietnam	505,366	2025	Broadcasting equipment
Russia	465,788	2025	Petroleum
Australia	429,327	2025	Iron ore
Thailand	411,510	2025	Data processing equipment
Brazil	404,920	2025	Iron ore
Turkey	393,277	2025	Cars
Saudi Arabia	380,370	2025	Petroleum
Sweden	366,211	2025	Cars
Malaysia	341,991	2025	Integrated circuits
Denmark	326,884	2025	Packaged medications
Indonesia	323,015	2025	Coal
Austria	319,409	2025	Cars
Czech Republic	262,493	2025	Cars
Norway	241,037	2025	Petroleum
Luxembourg	210,940	2025	Iron
Hungary	179,495	2025	Cars
Israel	173,988	2025	Diamonds
Romania	152,427	2025	Cars
Portugal	152,159	2025	Cars
Finland	136,479	2025	Paper
South Africa	134,488	2025	Platinum
Slovakia	131,331	2025	Cars
Chile	123,375	2025	Copper
Philippines	114,933	2025	Integrated circuits
Qatar	114,385	2025	Petroleum
Greece	111,837	2025	Petroleum
Argentina	105,492	2025	Soybeans
Iraq	102,917	2025	Petroleum
Iran	100,031	2024	Plastic
Kazakhstan	91,908	2024	Petroleum
Kuwait	89,709	2024	Petroleum
Peru	83,324	2024	Copper
Colombia	68,866	2024	Petroleum
Puerto Rico (US)	65,368	2024	Packaged medications
Oman	64,749	2023	Petroleum
Egypt	63,713	2024	Petroleum
Lithuania	62,895	2024	Petroleum
Bulgaria	62,622	2024	Copper
New Zealand	61,798	2024	Milk
Morocco	61,746	2024	Fertilizers
Algeria	59,426	2023	Petroleum
Slovenia	59,159	2024	Packaged medications
Nigeria	57,536	2024	Petroleum
Ukraine	56,114	2024	Sunflower seed oil
Bangladesh	53,848	2024	Clothing
Belarus	49,385	2024	Fertilizers
Serbia	46,940	2024	Insulated wire
Croatia	46,600	2024	Petroleum
Macau (CN)	45,040	2024	Jewelry
Bahrain	41,303	2024	Aluminium
Pakistan	40,218	2024	Clothing
Ecuador	38,468	2024	Petroleum
Panama	37,376	2024	Copper
Angola	36,923	2024	Petroleum
Costa Rica	36,770	2024	Medical instruments
Cyprus	35,119	2024	Boats
Libya	34,896	2024	Petroleum
Azerbaijan	34,112	2024	Petroleum
Democratic Republic of the Congo	32,984	2024	Copper
Estonia	32,636	2024	Wood
Cambodia	31,712	2024	Clothing
Malta	29,244	2024	Integrated circuits
Ghana	29,197	2024	Gold
Dominican Republic	28,563	2024	Gold
Latvia	28,116	2024	Wood
Tunisia	25,869	2024	Clothing
Uzbekistan	26,173	2024	Gold
Côte d'Ivoire	23,882	2024	Cocoa beans
Uruguay	23,329	2024	Beef
Jordan	22,734	2024	Clothing
Sri Lanka	19,680	2024	Clothing
Armenia	18,618	2024	Copper
Guatemala	17,996	2024	Clothing
Paraguay	17,395	2024	Soybeans
Myanmar	16,791	2023	Clothing
Georgia	16,321	2024	Copper
Mongolia	16,306	2024	Copper
Tanzania	15,622	2024	Gold
Iceland	13,915	2024	Aluminium
Kenya	13,865	2024	Tea
Guyana	13,739	2023	Petroleum
Papua New Guinea	12,930	2023	Petroleum
Bosnia and Herzegovina	12,141	2024	Energy
Bolivia	11,904	2023	Gold
Guinea	11,156	2024	Gold
Lebanon	11,770	2023	Gold
El Salvador	11,585	2024	Clothing
Brunei	11,482	2024	Petroleum
Zambia	11,453	2023	Copper
Trinidad and Tobago	11,086	2024	Petroleum
Ethiopia	10,865	2023	Coffee
North Macedonia	10,445	2024	Automobile catalysts
Mozambique	9,409	2022	Coal
Honduras	9,243	2022	Clothing
Venezuela	8,475	2023	Petroleum
Cuba	8,769	2020	Cigars
Turkmenistan	8,164	2020	Petroleum
Botswana	7,930	2021	Diamonds
Nicaragua	7,870	2022	Clothing
Laos	7,819	2021	Energy
Cameroon	7,449	2021	Petroleum
Albania	7,057	2022	Footwear
Equatorial Guinea	6,656	2022	Petroleum
Chad	6,503	2022	Petroleum
Jamaica	6,424	2022	Aluminium oxide
Burkina Faso	6,233	2021	Gold
Uganda	6,177	2021	Gold
Moldova	5,977	2022	Insulated wire
Sudan	5,908	2022	Gold
Gabon	5,390	2015	Petroleum
Mali	5,381	2021	Gold
Senegal	5,287	2018	Gold
Zimbabwe	5,263	2020	Gold
Djibouti	5,160	2021	Palm oil
Maldives	5,096	2022	Fish
Namibia	5,080	2022	Copper
Mauritius	4,918	2022	Fish
Republic of the Congo	4,700	2020	Petroleum
South Sudan	4,652	2021	Petroleum
U.S. Virgin Islands (US)	4,549	2022	Petroleum
Benin	4,154	2021	Cotton
Cayman Islands (UK)	3,652	2020	Boats
Kosovo	3,577	2024	Metal
Palestine	3,544	2022	Stone
San Marino	3,420	2021	Dish washing machines
Madagascar	3,341	2021	Vanilla
Kyrgyzstan	3,292	2021	Gold
Bahamas	3,202	2021	Petroleum
Mauritania	3,181	2021	Iron ore
Montenegro	3,178	2022	Aluminium
Aruba (NL)	3,004	2022	Petroleum
Rwanda	2,994	2022	Gold
Nepal	2,722	2022	Soybean oil
Suriname	2,599	2022	Gold
Andorra	2,414	2021	Cars
Fiji	2,376	2022	Water
Timor-Leste	2,315	2021	Petroleum
Barbados	2,228	2017	Rum
Eswatini	2,131	2021	Soft drink concentrates
New Caledonia (FR)	1,875	2016	Ferroalloys
Tajikistan	1,753	2022	Gold
Seychelles	1,751	2021	Boats
Togo	1,721	2020	Petroleum
Syria	1,608	2022	Olive oil
Malawi	1,538	2021	Tobacco
Niger	1,487	2021	Gold
Afghanistan	1,476	2020	Gold
Somalia	1,363	2022	Goats
Belize	1,345	2022	Sugarcane
Curaçao (NL)	1,280	2021	Petroleum
Haiti	1,241	2021	Clothes
Faroe Islands (DK)	1,213	2011	Fish
French Polynesia (FR)	1,202	2016	Pearls
Bermuda (UK)	1,136	2021	Boats
Sierra Leone	1,114	2021	Titanium ore
Lesotho	1,066	2022	Diamonds
Yemen	938	2016	Petroleum
Cape Verde	855	2022	Fish
Turks and Caicos Islands (UK)	827	2018	Molluscs
Bhutan	791	2022	Ferroalloys
Sint Maarten (NL)	788	2021	Petroleum
Antigua and Barbuda	752	2021	Petroleum
Saint Lucia	711	2021	Petroleum
Liberia	554	2019	Iron ore
Solomon Islands	411	2022	Wood
Grenada	394	2021	Fish
Saint Kitts and Nevis	393	2021	Broadcasting equipment
Eritrea	375	2011	Zinc
Guinea-Bissau	335	2021	Cashews
Central African Republic	316	2022	Gold
Burundi	285	2018	Gold
Samoa	171	2022	Coconut oil
Comoros	140	2021	Cloves
Saint Vincent and the Grenadines	138	2021	Boats
Gambia	135	2021	Cashews
Marshall Islands	130	2021	Boats
Micronesia	126	2014	Fish
Dominica	123	2021	Medical instruments
Vanuatu	89	2021	Fish
São Tomé and Príncipe	75	2021	Cocoa beans
Tonga	60	2022	Shellfish
Nauru	31	2018	Fish
Palau	12	2021	Computers
Kiribati	11	2021	Fish
Tuvalu	3	2021	Boats

== See also ==
- List of countries by exports per capita
- List of top exporting countries by category
- List of countries by high tech exports
- List of countries by imports
- List of countries by leading trade partners
- List of Chinese administrative divisions by exports
- List of U.S. states and territories by exports and imports
- List of German states by exports
- List of countries by oil exports
