= List of countries by imports =

A map of countries by imports (2016)

This is a list of countries and territories by their imports, including both merchandise imports and service imports, is based on data from the World Bank and the International Trade Centre (except for the European Union). Merchandise imports are goods that are produced in one country and purchased to another country. Services imports refer to the cross-border purchase or procurement of services by residents of one country from residents of another country. The list includes all 193 United Nations member states and some autonomous territories.

== By total and merchandise imports ==
List of countries by imports (in millions $)
Country / territory	Total imports		Merchandise imports	
Country / territory	CIA	WB	Value	Trade balance
World	–	31,323,932	24,090,346	–190,367
European Union (Note: The European Union (EU) is an economic and political union of 27 member states that are located primarily in Europe. The EU is included as a separate entity because it has many attributes of independent nations, being much more than a free-trade association such as ASEAN, NAFTA, or Mercosur.)	–	8,994,069	–	–
United States	4,108,000	4,083,292	3,359,310	–1,294,794
China	3,254,000	3,219,343	2,587,295	988,162
Germany	1,774,000	1,782,162	1,425,210	258,804
France	1,159,000	1,157,661	815,812	–113,869
United Kingdom	1,158,000	1,157,638	815,579	–302,669
Japan	965,047	981,638	743,267	–35,272
India	923,081	919,206	702,773	–261,073
Netherlands	884,154	884,311	635,409	86,886
Singapore	786,020	786,021	457,613	47,266
South Korea	758,724	752,670	632,098	51,593
Canada	733,778	733,286	554,263	14,981
Hong Kong (CN)	723,397	723,319	698,907	–58,337
Italy	717,278	722,349	615,599	59,275
Mexico	697,067	702,661	625,874	–6,892
Switzerland	582,554	580,072	369,660	77,187
Ireland	580,399	608,488	144,552	97,667
Spain	568,502	568,717	451,303	–47,600
Belgium	531,029	526,554	519,086	30,485
United Arab Emirates	481,852	481,852	326,119	–16,414
Poland	441,945	441,992	379,496	837
Australia	405,336	396,154	284,465	61,393
Vietnam	398,672	339,930	382,477	137,343
Russia	381,450	382,412	205,982	192,135
Brazil	377,050	381,758	262,870	74,177
Turkey	367,022	367,557	344,017	–82,216
Taiwan	351,441	–	394,063	80,556
Thailand	351,419	351,174	310,155	–10,906
Saudi Arabia	317,012	317,307	232,028	73,330
Sweden	309,526	306,338	188,973	6,787
Austria	284,467	279,663	211,992	1,886
Indonesia	279,419	284,696	233,659	31,045
Malaysia	279,090	278,551	300,081	29,964
Denmark	252,954	253,019	121,792	11,862
Czech Republic	216,741	216,255	229,397	29,895
Norway	162,467	162,845	98,730	69,323
Philippines	161,154	185,164	134,882	–61,899
Luxembourg	160,032	170,295	24,908	–9,272
Romania	159,575	159,597	136,519	–36,148
Hungary	154,077	154,058	151,631	16,075
Israel	140,438	140,592	91,538	–29,835
Portugal	136,976	137,862	115,997	–30,183
Finland	122,644	122,652	80,414	–2,259
Greece	122,408	121,725	89,273	–35,916
Slovakia	120,290	120,540	111,053	658
South Africa	119,590	119,489	101,244	9,147
Iran	117,176	117,176	23,189	–10,455
Chile	99,239	99,531	79,688	23,624
Ukraine	92,025	92,210	70,496	–30,086
Egypt	82,265	90,357	94,698	–49,851
Iraq	81,179	104,107	52,309	56,788
Argentina	79,999	81,218	60,822	18,899
Colombia	78,633	87,542	64,105	–14,553
Bangladesh	74,960	73,445	63,654	–4,454
Kazakhstan	74,246	71,882	59,787	21,831
Morocco	73,759	81,033	63,513	–15,063
Qatar	69,692	74,520	31,586	57,181
New Zealand	67,998	68,115	46,896	–4,477
Peru	67,160	66,343	55,027	19,638
Pakistan	66,844	63,703	56,523	–24,062
Kuwait	61,521	55,913	38,107	37,885
Bulgaria	60,029	60,013	53,806	–7,159
Lithuania	58,491	58,504	44,747	–4,927
Nigeria	57,730	–	47,478	10,502
Slovenia	54,583	54,326	74,967	–8,356
Puerto Rico (US)	53,898	53,898	–	–
Algeria	51,131	49,682	43,703	3,623
Belarus	50,679	50,784	16,813	–10,075
Croatia	49,860	48,962	45,487	–19,424
Serbia	48,158	52,353	42,113	–10,997
Oman	47,412	47,412	28,553	40,709
Uzbekistan	43,624	43,643	55,524	–23,668
Dominican Republic	36,144	36,061	32,702	–19,778
Guatemala	35,576	35,603	32,489	–17,900
Cambodia	34,329	33,413	28,711	–2,046
Ecuador	33,970	33,568	29,490	4,931
Cyprus	33,802	33,829	13,422	–8,926
DR Congo	33,680	35,992	11,750	17,348
Libya	33,284	27,563	20,312	9,556
Bahrain	33,044	32,379	21,477	–7,583
Estonia	32,375	32,376	22,672	–2,899
Panama	30,887	35,881	26,687	–13,505
Costa Rica	30,459	31,274	23,684	–3,801
Latvia	29,234	29,238	23,496	–3,109
Jordan	28,922	30,447	22,678	–12,515
Azerbaijan	27,339	27,339	21,058	5,496
Ghana	26,024	28,244	20,295	–4,067
Malta	24,505	25,801	9,447	–5,665
Lebanon	23,313	14,789	13,663	–11,717
Macau (CN)	23,205	22,768	15,892	–14,823
Myanmar	23,100	–	12,452	2,472
Ethiopia	22,951	23,265	7,997	–4,641
Angola	22,683	19,627	13,946	25,304
Kenya	22,046	23,850	20,203	–11,947
Tunisia	21,953	30,206	20,477	158
Côte d'Ivoire	19,948	23,425	17,219	3,330
Uruguay	19,117	19,191	12,523	–2,274
Armenia	19,087	19,544	16,808	–3,780
Georgia	18,915	18,905	13,072	–9,878
Sri Lanka	18,823	22,278	18,605	–6,581
Venezuela	18,432	151,446	15,284	–1,651
Paraguay	18,377	17,619	16,563	–5,762
El Salvador	18,354	18,354	15,973	–9,525
Honduras	18,235	21,351	14,509	–7,538
Nepal	17,777	14,122	10,358	–9,090
Bosnia and Herzegovina	16,202	16,199	15,853	–6,959
Tanzania	16,059	17,082	15,284	–6,982
Senegal	14,916	13,921	11,389	–5,079
Iceland	14,298	14,300	9,833	–2,883
Uganda	13,853	13,179	13,833	–5,794
Mongolia	13,545	16,452	11,608	4,157
Bolivia	12,988	13,959	9,904	–845
North Macedonia	12,644	12,647	11,967	–3,544
Albania	11,697	11,676	9,604	–5,603
Sudan	11,575	633	3,961	–915
Nicaragua	11,437	11,435	11,468	–3,946
Guyana	10,956	905	7,211	15,204
Zambia	10,854	10,313	11,268	8
Kyrgyzstan	10,655	14,495	11,907	–8,167
Mozambique	10,488	11,867	9,213	–1,001
Moldova	10,418	10,420	9,065	–5,510
Cameroon	10,294	10,855	8,206	–1,054
Zimbabwe	10,293	13,507	9,568	–2,133
Trinidad and Tobago	10,190	–	7,670	241
Jamaica	9,524	8,244	6,707	–5,496
Namibia	9,199	9,091	8,825	–2,297
Gibraltar (UK)	–	–	9,165	–9,003
Brunei	9,110	9,112	7,295	3,964
Somalia	9,002	9,002	3,233	–2,767
Laos	8,596	6,665	9,241	1,838
Guinea	8,365	14,201	7,692	1,970
Palestine	8,264	8,264	1,963	–1,865
Cuba	8,067	8,067	4,442	–3,021
Mali	8,066	7,547	6,020	–4,991
Mauritius	8,027	8,641	6,802	–5,048
Turkmenistan	7,563	7,563	3,957	9,871
Kosovo	7,362	8,065	–	–
Botswana	7,228	7,940	7,114	–3,195
Papua New Guinea	7,192	2,314	5,643	8,311
Bahamas	7,069	6,564	4,944	–4,000
Afghanistan	6,983	8,702	6,212	–4,599
Tajikistan	6,907	5,931	6,466	–4,683
Burkina Faso	6,834	8,124	6,435	–791
Syria	6,803	6,803	3,799	–2,875
Benin	6,189	4,683	3,367	–2,254
Gabon	6,094	6,094	2,758	5,105
Madagascar	6,041	5,461	4,804	–2,247
Rwanda	5,783	5,577	2,113	–1,509
Montenegro	5,478	5,451	4,399	–3,738
Maldives	5,344	4,986	3,643	–3,549
Haiti	5,303	4,754	3,568	–2,729
Mauritania	5,271	5,665	4,818	–668
U.S. Virgin Islands	5,058	5,058	–	–
Djibouti	4,765	6,058	7,649	–7,420
Republic of the Congo	4,487	6,352	4,658	3,437
South Sudan	4,443	3,467	976	–480
Guam (US)	4,421	4,421	–	–
Yemen	4,079	10,224	8,954	–8,320
Malawi	3,995	–	3,315	–2,356
Niger	3,808	4,067	1,501	–493
Chad	3,557	3,557	1,213	2,277
Cayman Islands (UK)	3,444	2,592	7,069	–4,752
Fiji	3,434	3,767	3,122	–1,972
Equatorial Guinea	3,240	3,240	961	3,453
San Marino	3,169	3,169	–	–
Curaçao (NL)	2,764	2,803	2,663	–2,451
Andorra	2,716	–	1,877	–1,771
Suriname	2,571	1,678	1,751	–266
Aruba (NL)	2,565	2,972	1,430	–1,261
Seychelles	2,437	2,237	1,508	–913
Togo	2,389	3,781	3,222	–1,855
Eswatini	2,351	2,367	2,140	14
Bermuda (UK)	2,300	2,174	1,271	–1,202
Sierra Leone	2,264	3,286	2,079	–554
New Caledonia (FR)	2,260	3,479	1,755	–371
Faroe Islands (DK)	2,212	2,212	1,639	–47
Barbados	2,120	–	2,154	–1,692
Lesotho	2,083	2,088	1,879	–874
North Korea	–	–	1,969	–1,558
Liberia	1,961	–	29,202	–26,814
United States Minor Outlying Islands (US)	–	–	1,781	–1,493
Belize	1,724	1,571	1,440	–1,163
Greenland (DK)	1,700	1,700	1,040	525
French Polynesia (FR)	1,660	2,922	2,290	–2,131
Gambia	1,549	932	988	–939
Bhutan	1,513	1,607	1,462	–987
Sint Maarten (NL)	1,489	–	272	–256
Cape Verde	1,473	1,473	916	–847
Saint Lucia	1,446	–	1,641	–1,548
Burundi	1,433	643	1,268	–1,083
Antigua and Barbuda	1,282	1,176	663	–630
Timor-Leste	1,197	1,381	1,057	–966
British Virgin Islands (UK)	–	–	1,111	–833
Grenada	991	–	635	–591
Central African Republic	891	891	779	–575
Solomon Islands	857	811	571	100
Northern Mariana Islands (US)	777	777	152	–149
American Samoa (US)	677	677	–	–
Bonaire (NL)	–	–	664	–618
Saint Kitts and Nevis	643	–	375	324
Saint Vincent and the Grenadines	641	–	499	–441
Guinea-Bissau	592	598	522	–310
Vanuatu	579	572	560	–237
Samoa	576	575	382	–333
Turks and Caicos Islands (UK)	544	–	893	–860
Comoros	504	533	382	–333
Eritrea	494	604	351	216
Tonga	393	384	308	–284
Dominica	388	–	300	–264
Micronesia	326	326	170	163
Cook Islands	–	–	314	–279
Kiribati	294	292	192	–82
Falkland Islands (UK)	–	–	243	83
São Tomé and Príncipe	219	–	159	–110
Palau	217	190	203	–182
Marshall Islands	206	185	17,413	–15,578
Nauru	150	190	66.4	137
Anguilla (UK)	–	–	143	–138
British Indian Ocean Territory (UK)	–	–	136	–120
Saint Pierre and Miquelon (FR)	–	–	72.5	–63
French Southern and Antarctic Lands (FR)	–	–	69.8	–53
Wallis and Futuna (FR)	–	–	57.8	–57
Tuvalu	57.4	–	114	–33
Niue	–	–	56.1	–48
Saint Helena, Ascension and Tristan da Cunha (UK)	–	–	54.4	–21
Christmas Island (AU)	–	–	50.9	–38
Norfolk Island (AU)	–	–	43.7	–40
Tokelau (NZ)	–	–	41.1	–6
Cocos Islands (AU)	–	–	16.2	–12
Montserrat (UK)	15.3	–	26.1	62
Pitcairn Islands (UK)	–	–	4.4	–3
Western Sahara (MR)	–	–	1.6	3

== See also ==
- List of countries by exports
- List of countries by leading trade partners
- List of U.S. states and territories by exports and imports
