= List of Chinese provincial-level divisions by exports =

The article lists China's province-level divisions by exports of goods. Each province's exports is listed in nominal US dollar values according to annual average exchange rates

== Mainland China ==
The 22 provinces, 5 autonomous regions and 4 direct-administered municipalities of mainland China by export value.

Color	Regions of China
	North China
	East China
	Southwestern China
	Northwestern China
	South Central China
	Northeast China

Rank	Province	Region	Exports in bn. US$	Source	Year
—	Mainland China		3,380.0		2023
1	Guangdong	South Central China	888.6		2022
2	Zhejiang	East China	532.1		2023
3	Jiangsu	East China	518.1		2022
4	Shandong	East China	272.2		2021
5	Shanghai	East China	254.8		2023
6	Fujian	East China	167.4		2021
7	Sichuan	Southwestern China	88.4		2021
8	Chongqing	Southwestern China	80.0		2021
9	Henan	South Central China	77.8		2021
10	Beijing	North China	67.0		2020
11	Hunan	South Central China	65.2		2021
12	Anhui	East China	63.4		2021
13	Tianjin	North China	60.0		2021
14	Jiangxi	East China	56.8		2021
15	Hubei	South Central China	54.3		2021
16	Liaoning	Northeast China	51.3		2021
17	Hebei	North China	46.9		2021
18	Guangxi	South Central China	45.6		2021
19	Shaanxi	Northwestern China	39.7		2021
20	Yunnan	Southwestern China	27.4		2021
21	Shanxi	North China	21.1		2021
22	Xinjiang	Northwestern China	19.7		2020
23	Guizhou	Southwestern China	7.6		2021
24	Inner Mongolia	North China	7.4		2021
25	Heilongjiang	Northeast China	6.9		2021
26	Jilin	Northeast China	5.5		2021
27	Hainan	South Central China	5.2		2021
28	Ningxia	Northwestern China	2.7		2021
29	Gansu	Northwestern China	1.5		2021
30	Tibet Autonomous Region	Southwestern China	0.3		2021
31	Qinghai	Northwestern China	0.3		2021

== Hong Kong, Macau and Taiwan ==
The 2 special administrative regions of Hong Kong and Macau and the claimed province of Taiwan by export value in the most recent year. Exports to mainland China are included.

	Exports in bn. US$	Source	Year
Hong Kong	535.6		2023
Taiwan	432.5		2023
Macau	1.9		2022
