= List of countries by leading trade partners =

For most economies worldwide, their leading export and import trading partners in terms of value are typically the United States, the European Union (EU) or China. Emerging markets such as Russia, Brazil, India, South Africa, Saudi Arabia, the UAE, Turkey, and Iran are becoming increasingly important as major markets or source countries in various regions.

For individual EU member states, intra-EU trade is collectively greater than trade with any other partner. Both the EU and the United States have China as their largest source of imports. Conversely, the EU is China's largest source of imports. While the EU and the United States dominate as the largest trading partners in many parts of the world, other countries such as Brazil, Russia, and South Africa are gaining prominence within their respective regions.

Some countries, especially isolated ones, heavily rely on a larger neighbouring country for trade. For instance, Venezuela is a key export market for Cuba, while Uzbekistan, being doubly-landlocked, primarily exports to its singly-landlocked neighbours, Tajikistan and Afghanistan.

The largest import and export merchandise trade partners for most countries of the world are listed below. Details for the European Union, Hong Kong and Macau are also included. In most cases the data relates to 2021 rankings. Data was extracted from the World Trade Organization's Trade Profile Database.

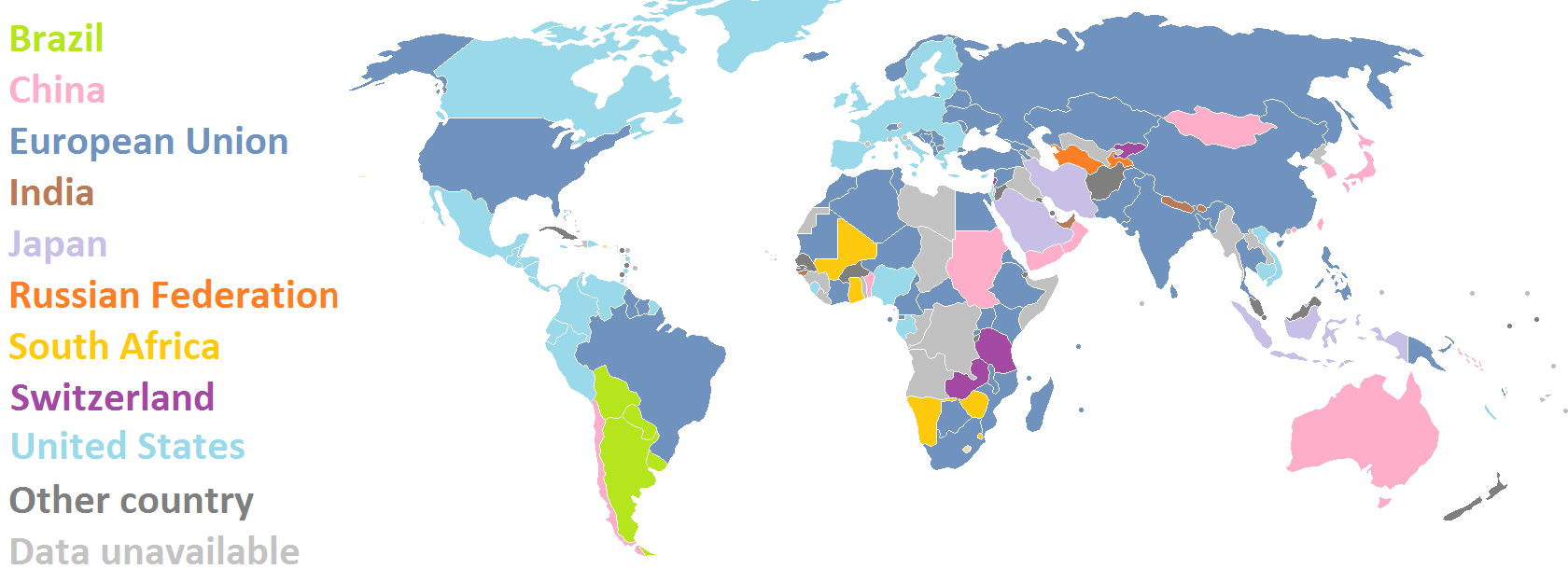
Colour indicate leading merchandise export destination for indicated country (EU aggregated), c. 2007-10.

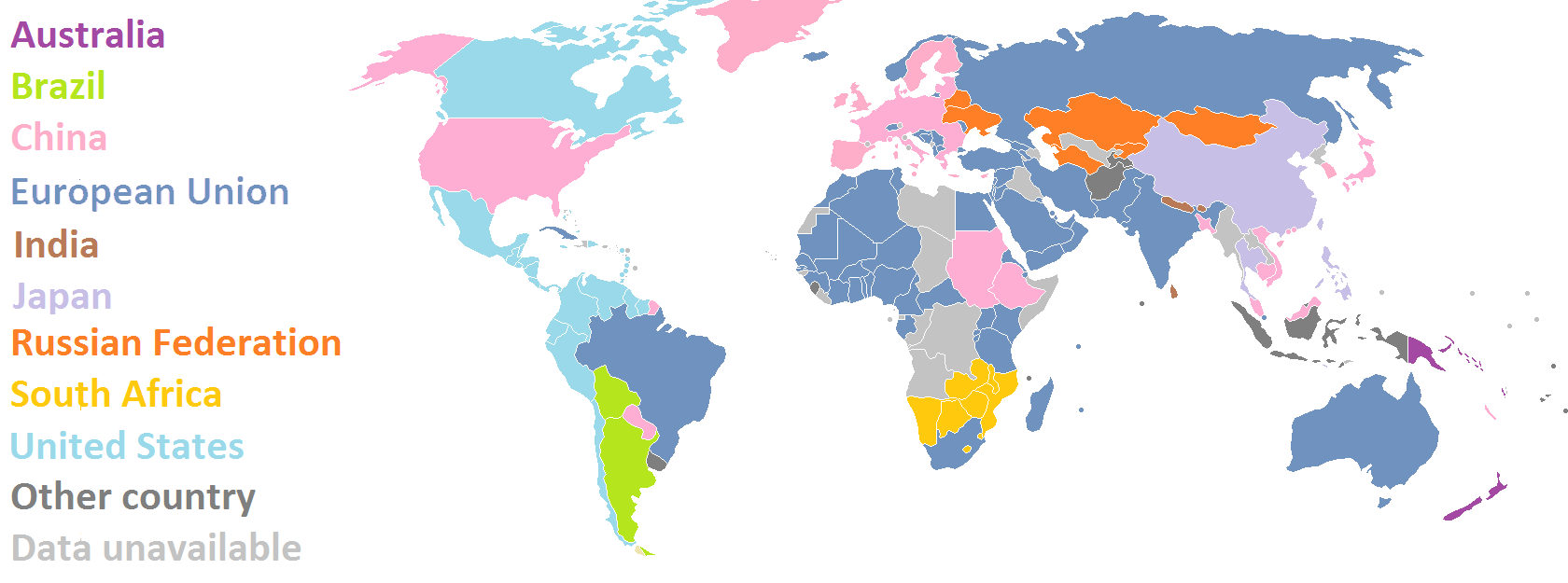
Colour indicate leading source of merchandise imports for indicated country (EU aggregated), c. 2007-10.

== Leading export markets and import sources ==
Country	Leading export market	Leading import source
Abkhazia	Russia	
Afghanistan	India	Iran
Albania	European Union	
Algeria	European Union	
Andorra	European Union	
Angola	China	European Union
Antigua and Barbuda	United Arab Emirates	United States
Argentina	Brazil	China
Armenia	Russia	
Artsakh	Armenia	
Aruba	Colombia	United States
Australia	China	
Austria	European Union	
Azerbaijan	European Union	
Bahamas	United States	
Bahrain	Saudi Arabia	
Bangladesh	United States	China
Barbados	United States	
Belarus	Russia	
Belgium	European Union	
Belize	United Kingdom	United States
Benin	Bangladesh	European Union
Bermuda	United States	
Bhutan	India	
Bolivia	India	China
Bosnia and Herzegovina	European Union	
Botswana	United Arab Emirates	South Africa
Brazil	China	
Brunei	Japan	Malaysia
Bulgaria	European Union	
Burkina Faso	Switzerland	China
Burundi	United Arab Emirates	China
Cape Verde	European Union	
Cambodia	United States	China
Cameroon	European Union	
Canada	United States	
Cayman Islands	United States	
Central African Republic	European Union	
Chad	United States	European Union
Chile	China	
China	United States	European Union
Colombia	United States	China
Comoros	European Union	
Congo	China	European Union
Congo, Democratic Republic of the	China	
Cook Islands	Russia	New Zealand
Costa Rica	United States	
Croatia	European Union	
Cuba	Russia	China
Cyprus	European Union	
Czech Republic	European Union	
Denmark	European Union	
Djibouti	Ethiopia	European Union
Dominica	Trinidad and Tobago	United States
Dominican Republic	United States	
Ecuador	United States	China
Egypt	European Union	
El Salvador	United States	
Equatorial Guinea	European Union	
Eritrea	China	European Union
Estonia	European Union	
Swaziland	South Africa	
Ethiopia	European Union	China
European Union	United States	China
Fiji	United States	Singapore
Finland	European Union	
France	European Union	
Gabon	United States	European Union
Gambia	Senegal	Norway
Georgia	European Union	
Germany	European Union	
Ghana	China	European Union
Greece	European Union	
Grenada	United States	
Guatemala	United States	
Guinea	United Arab Emirates	European Union
Guinea-Bissau	India	European Union
Guyana	United States	Singapore
Haiti	United States	
Honduras	United States	
Hong Kong	China	
Hungary	European Union	
Iceland	European Union	
India	United States	China
Indonesia	China	
Iran	China	
Iraq	China	
Ireland	European Union	
Israel	United States	European Union
Italy	European Union	
Ivory Coast	European Union	
Jamaica	United States	
Japan	China	
Jordan	United States	European Union
Kazakhstan	European Union	China
Kenya	European Union	China
Kiribati	Japan	Fiji
Kosovo	European Union	
Kuwait	Saudi Arabia	European Union
Kyrgyzstan	Kazakhstan	Russia
Laos	Thailand	
Latvia	European Union	
Lebanon	United Arab Emirates	European Union
Lesotho	European Union	South Africa
Liberia	European Union	Singapore
Libya	European Union	
Lithuania	European Union	
Luxembourg	European Union	
Macau	Hong Kong	European Union
Madagascar	European Union	China
Malawi	European Union	South Africa
Malaysia	China	
Maldives	Thailand	Oman
Mali	South Africa	Senegal
Malta	European Union	
Mauritania	China	European Union
Mauritius	European Union	
Mexico	United States	
Federated States of Micronesia	Guam	United States
Moldova	European Union	
Mongolia	China	
Montenegro	European Union	
Morocco	European Union	
Mozambique	European Union	South Africa
Myanmar	China	
Namibia	China	South Africa
Nepal	India	
Netherlands	European Union	
New Zealand	China	
Nicaragua	United States	
Niger	European Union	
Nigeria	European Union	
Northern Cyprus	Turkey	
North Korea	China	
North Macedonia	European Union	
Norway	European Union	
Oman	United Arab Emirates	
Pakistan	European Union	China
Palau	Japan	United States
State of Palestine	Israel	
Panama	China	United States
Papua New Guinea	Australia	
Paraguay	Brazil	China
Peru	China	
Philippines	United States	China
Poland	European Union	
Portugal	European Union	
Qatar	China	European Union
Romania	European Union	
Russia	China	
Rwanda	DR Congo	China
Saint Kitts and Nevis	United States	
Saint Lucia	United States	
Saint Vincent and the Grenadines	Barbados	United States
Samoa	New Zealand	
Sao Tome and Principe	European Union	
Saudi Arabia	China	European Union
Senegal	Mali	European Union
Serbia	European Union	
Seychelles	European Union	
Sierra Leone	European Union	China
Singapore	China	
Slovakia	European Union	
Slovenia	European Union	
Solomon Islands	China	Australia
Somalia	Saudi Arabia	India
Somaliland	Saudi Arabia	China
South Africa	European Union	
South Korea	China	
South Ossetia	Russia	
South Sudan	China	United Arab Emirates
Spain	European Union	
Sri Lanka	United States	China
Sudan	United Arab Emirates	China
Suriname	United Arab Emirates	United States
Sweden	European Union	
Switzerland	European Union	
Syria	European Union	
Taiwan	United States	China
Tajikistan	Turkey	Russia
Tanzania	United Arab Emirates	China
Thailand	United States	China
Timor Leste	Indonesia	
Togo	Burkina Faso	European Union
Tonga	New Zealand	
Transnistria	Moldova	Russia
Trinidad and Tobago	United States	
Tunisia	European Union	
Turkey	European Union	
Turkmenistan	China	Turkey
Tuvalu	Fiji	
Uganda	United Arab Emirates	China
Ukraine	European Union	
United Arab Emirates	India	China
United Kingdom	European Union	
United States	Canada	China
Uruguay	China	Brazil
Uzbekistan	China	Russia
Vanuatu	Malaysia	Australia
Venezuela	United States	
Vietnam	United States	China
Yemen	Egypt	United Arab Emirates
Zambia	Switzerland	South Africa
Zimbabwe	South Africa	

== List of 30 largest bilateral trade volume in 2013 ==
The following table shows figures for 30 largest bilateral trade volume in 2013 according to the World Trade Organization.

The 30 largest bilateral trade volume in 2013 (millions of US$)
Rank	Net exporter	Net importer	Reported volume of net exporter	Reported volume of net importer
1	Germany	European Union	1,468,990	
2	Netherlands	European Union	798,744	
3	European Union	France		745,931
4	European Union	United States	603,194	660,541
5	Canada	United States	594,546	637,270
6	Belgium	European Union	628,796	
7	China	Hong Kong	400,571	592,147
8	China	United States	526,854	582,291
9	European Union	United Kingdom		580,318
10	China	European Union	560,536	533,494
11	Italy	European Union	539,556	
12	Mexico	United States	492,715	509,513
13	Russia	European Union	385,778	405,889
14	Spain	European Union	365,191	
15	China	Japan	312,062	310,230
16	European Union	Switzerland	328,609	271,657
17	South Korea	China	229,073	273,869
18	Poland	European Union	267,854	
19	European Union	Austria		244,913
20	Czech Republic	European Union	225,091	
21	Japan	United States	206,091	206,836
22	European Union	Sweden		204,849
	China	Germany		187,293
23	Norway	European Union	184,296	174,708
	Germany	United States	184,247	
24	European Union	Turkey	159,598	156,813
25	Hungary	European Union	154,862	
26	European Union	Japan	137,786	149,827
27	Australia	China	134,154	123,296
28	European Union	Denmark		129,951
29	Taiwan	China	124,502	
	United Kingdom	United States	116,675	
	Germany	Switzerland	115,041	
30	Ireland	European Union	105,853	
