= List of the largest trading partners of New Zealand =

International Trade

This is a list of the largest two-way trading partners of New Zealand, based on data released by the Statistics New Zealand for the 2023 calendar year.

== Largest trading partners ==
The 10 largest trading partners of New Zealand with their total trade (sum of imports and exports) in millions of New Zealand dollars and the total trade for all countries for the 2023 calendar year were as follows:

Rank	Country/District	Exports	Imports	Total Trade	Trade Balance	Share of Total Trade
1	People's Republic of China	20,611	17,161	37,772	3,449	18.4%
2	Australia	14,710	16,285	30,995	-1,575	15.1%
3	United States	14,261	11,623	25,884	2,638	12.6%
4	European Union	5,718	14,969	20,687	-9,252	10.1%
5	Singapore	2,322	7,919	10,241	-5,597	5.0%
6	Japan	4,295	5,545	9,839	-1,250	4.8%
7	South Korea	2,787	5,965	8,752	-3,178	4.3%
8	United Kingdom	2,875	3,403	6,278	-527	3.1%
9	Malaysia	1,515	3,293	4,808	-1,778	2.3%
10	Thailand	1,424	3,017	4,441	-1,593	2.2%
11	Indonesia	1,700	1,395	3,095	306	1.5%
12	Taiwan	1,810	1,102	2,912	440	1.4%
13	Vietnam	1,078	1,551	2,629	-473	1.3%
14	India	1,228	1,448	2,676	-220	1.3%
15	Canada	1,356	1,013	2,369	343	1.2%
Total all economies		94,349	111,485	205,834	-17,136	100.0%

== Top export markets ==
The 15 largest export markets of New Zealand in millions of New Zealand dollars for the 2023 calendar year were as follows:

Rank	Country/District	Value (NZD Million)	Share of overall exports
1	People's Republic of China	20,611	21.8%
2	Australia	14,710	15.6%
3	United States	14,261	15.1%
4	European Union	5,718	6.1%
5	Japan	4,295	4.6%
6	United Kingdom	2,875	3.0%
7	South Korea	2,787	3.0%
8	Singapore	2,322	2.5%
9	Taiwan	1,810	1.9%
10	Indonesia	1,700	1.8%
11	Malaysia	1,515	1.6%
12	Thailand	1,424	1.5%
13	Canada	1,356	1.4%
14	India	1,228	1.3%
15	Vietnam	1,078	1.1%
Total all economies		94,349	100.0%

== Top import sources ==
The 15 largest import sources to New Zealand in millions of New Zealand dollars for the 2023 calendar year were as follows:

Rank	Country/District	Value (NZD Million)	Share of overall imports
1	People's Republic of China	17,161	15.4%
2	Australia	16,285	14.6%
3	European Union	14,969	13.4%
4	United States	11,623	10.4%
5	Singapore	7,919	7.1%
6	South Korea	5,965	5.4%
7	Japan	5,545	5.0%
8	United Kingdom	3,403	3.1%
9	Malaysia	3,293	3.0%
10	Thailand	3,017	2.7%
11	Switzerland	1,873	1.7%
12	Vietnam	1,551	1.4%
13	India	1,448	1.3%
14	Indonesia	1,395	1.3%
15	Taiwan	1,102	1.0%
Total all economies		111,485	100.0%

== See also ==
- List of the largest trading partners of Australia
- List of the largest trading partners of the ASEAN
- List of the largest trading partners of Canada
- List of the largest trading partners of China
- List of the largest trading partners of the European Union
  - List of the largest trading partners of Germany
  - List of the largest trading partners of Italy
  - List of the largest trading partners of the Netherlands
- List of the largest trading partners of India
- List of the largest trading partners of Russia
- List of the largest trading partners of United Kingdom
- List of the largest trading partners of the United States
- List of the largest trading partners of South Korea
