= List of the largest trading partners of Australia =

This is a list of the largest two-way trading partners of Australia, based on data released by the Australian Department of Foreign Affairs and Trade for the 2022 calendar year.

== The largest trading partners ==
The 15 largest trading partners of Australia with their total trade (sum of imports and exports) in millions of Australian dollars and the total trade for all countries for the 2023 calendar year were as follows:

Rank	Country/District	Exports	Imports	Total Trade	Trade Balance
1	China	219,037	108,131	327,168	110,906
-	ASEAN-5	77,217	89,601	166,818	-12,384
2	Japan	90,052	30,549	120,601	59,503
-	European Union	31,816	76,650	108,466	-44,833
3	United States	33,570	65,090	98,660	-31,520
4	South Korea	43,879	27,277	71,156	16,602
5	India	35,414	13,734	49,148	21,680
6	Singapore	22,777	23,968	46,745	-1,191
7	New Zealand	19,046	15,377	34,423	3,669
8	Malaysia	13,595	20,621	34,215	-7,026
9	Taiwan	23,471	10,111	33,583	13,360
10	Thailand	11,013	21,777	32,790	-10,764
11	United Kingdom	13,387	17,848	31,235	-4,461
12	Germany	5,323	22,975	28,298	-17,652
13	Indonesia	15,179	11,619	26,798	3,560
14	Vietnam	14,653	11,616	26,269	3,037
15	Hong Kong	12,716	4,300	17,016	8,416
Total all economies		672,588	570,874	1,243,462	101,714

== Top export markets ==
The 15 largest export markets of Australia in millions of Australian dollars for the 2022 calendar year were as follows:

Rank	Country/District	Value (A$ million)	Share of overall exports
1	China	185,141	27.6%
2	Japan	119,889	17.9%
3	South Korea	53,990	8.1%
4	India	34,921	5.2%
5	United States	30,690	4.6%
6	Taiwan	30,609	4.6%
7	Singapore	24,009	3.6%
8	New Zealand	18,109	2.7%
9	Vietnam	15,341	2.3%
10	Malaysia	15,193	2.3%
11	Indonesia	14,663	2.2%
12	Hong Kong	9,326	1.4%
13	Netherlands	9,176	1.4%
14	Thailand	8,996	1.3%
15	United Kingdom	8,693	1.3%

== Top import sources ==
The 15 largest import sources to Australia in millions of Australian dollars for the 2022 calendar year were as follows:

Rank	Country/District	Value (A$ million)	Share of overall imports
1	China	114,224	21.5%
2	United States	56,621	10.7%
3	Singapore	28,888	5.4%
4	South Korea	27,869	5.3%
5	Japan	27,428	5.2%
6	Germany	22,799	4.3%
7	Thailand	18,697	3.5%
8	Malaysia	18,167	3.4%
9	United Kingdom	16,178	3.1%
10	India	13,538	2.6%
11	New Zealand	13,271	2.5%
12	Taiwan	12,127	2.3%
13	Vietnam	10,340	1.9%
14	Italy	9,944	1.9%
15	Indonesia	8,643	1.6%

== See also ==
- List of the largest trading partners of New Zealand
- List of the largest trading partners of the ASEAN
- List of the largest trading partners of Canada
- List of the largest trading partners of China
- List of the largest trading partners of the European Union
  - List of the largest trading partners of Germany
  - List of the largest trading partners of Italy
  - List of the largest trading partners of the Netherlands
- List of the largest trading partners of India
- List of the largest trading partners of Russia
- List of the largest trading partners of United Kingdom
- List of the largest trading partners of the United States
- List of the largest trading partners of South Korea
