= List of the largest trading partners of Canada =

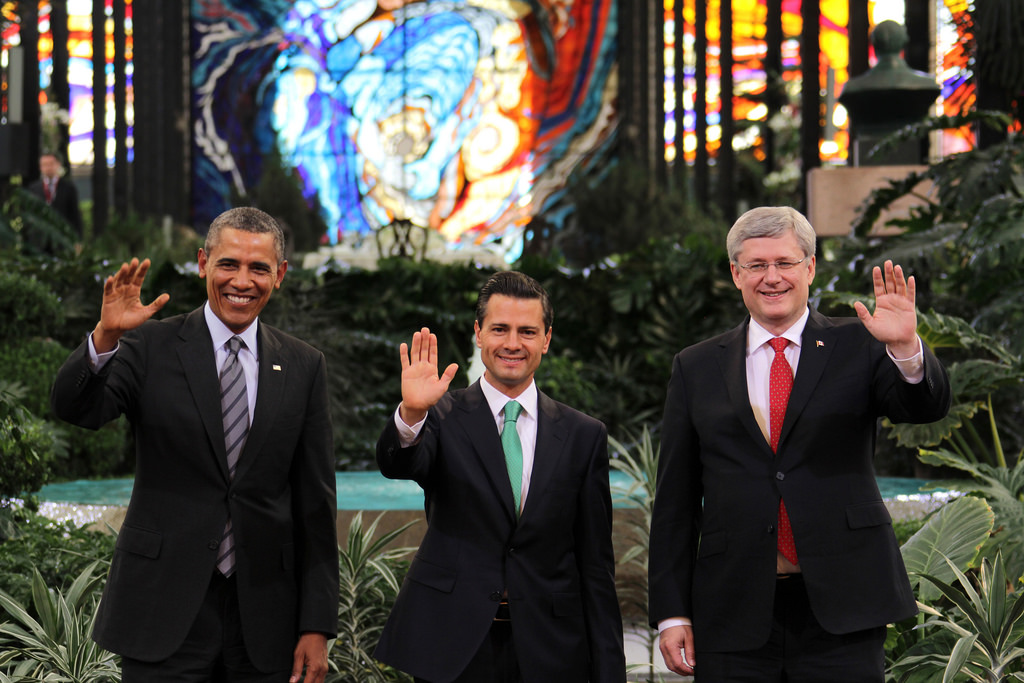
NAFTA leaders Canadian Prime Minister Stephen Harper, Mexican President Peña Nieto, and U.S. President Barack Obama, 2014

Canada maintains extensive trade relations with numerous countries around the world as a trading nation, although its largest trading partners are primarily concentrated in North America, Europe, and Asia. These economic relationships are measured by the total value of goods and services exchanged.

== Contemporary overview ==
Canada is a founding member of the World Trade Organization (WTO) since 1 January 1995, having been an original GATT member since 1 January 1948. Canada has concluded free trade agreements with 51 countries, recently with South Korea, which represents Canada's first FTA with a partner in the Asia-Pacific region. Canada has two other significant overseas multilateral trade agreements: the Comprehensive Economic and Trade Agreement (CETA) with the European Union and the 11-nation Comprehensive and Progressive Agreement for Trans-Pacific Partnership (CPTPP) with 10 other Pacific-Rim countries.

Canadian exports account for roughly 2.4% of the total value of goods exported worldwide, projected at US$23.926 trillion for 2024. Of that total trade, roughly 70% to 75% is done with countries that are part of free trade agreements with Canada—primarily the United States through the Canada–United States–Mexico Agreement being the largest.

== Largest trade partners by total trade ==
The following table shows Canada's largest trading partners for the 2024 calendar year, ranked by total goods trade (exports plus imports) in billions of Canadian dollars. These figures include goods only and exclude services and foreign direct investment.

Rank	Territory	Exports ($ billions)	Imports ($ billions)	Total trade ($ billions)	Total trade(%)	Trade balance ($ billions)
-	World	720.1	765.7	1,485.8	100%	-45.6
1	United States	547.4	377.0	924.4	62.22%	+170.4
-	Indo-Pacific	75.5	183.0	258.5	17.40%	-107.5
-	Europe and Central Asia	68.8	109.3	178.1	11.99%	-40.5
2	China	29.3	88.8	118.1	7.95%	-59.5
-	European Union	34.5	73.6	108.1	7.27%	-39.1
-	Latin America and the Caribbean	18.6	76.4	95.0	6.40%	-57.8
3	Mexico	8.1	47.3	55.4	3.73%	-39.2
4	United Kingdom	27.0	9.8	36.8	2.48%	+17.2
5	Japan	14.8	21.4	36.2	2.48%	-6.6
6	Germany	5.7	23.8	29.5	1.99%	-18.1
7	South Korea	7.5	16.9	24.4	1.64%	-4.5
8	Vietnam	1.0	14.7	15.7	1.06%	-1.5
9	Italy	3.1	12.5	15.6	1.05%	-9.4
-	Africa	5.4	9.5	14.9	1.00%	-4.5
10	Switzerland	6.1	8.1	14.2	0.96%	-2.0
-	Middle East	5.4	4.9	10.3	0.69%	+0.5

== Largest export partners ==
The following table shows Canada's largest export partners for the 2024 calendar year, ranked by total goods exported in billions of Canadian dollars. These figures include goods only and exclude services and foreign direct investment.

Rank	Territory	Exports ($ billions)	Total export (%)
-	World	720.1	100%
1	United States	547.4	76.02%
-	Indo-Pacific	75.5	10.48%
-	Europe and Central Asia	68.8	9.55%
-	European Union	34.5	4.79%
2	China	29.3	4.07%
3	United Kingdom	27.0	3.75%
-	Latin America and the Caribbean	18.6	2.58%
4	Japan	14.8	2.06%
5	Mexico	8.1	1.25%
6	South Korea	7.5	1.04%
7	Netherlands	6.3	0.87%
8	Switzerland	6.1	0.85%
9	Germany	5.7	0.79%
-	Africa	5.4	0.75%
-	Middle East	5.4	0.75%
10	India	5.1	0.70%

== Largest import partners ==
The following table shows Canada's largest import partners for the 2024 calendar year, ranked by total goods exported in billions of Canadian dollars. These figures include goods only and exclude services and foreign direct investment.

Rank	Territory	Imports ($ billions)	Total import (%)
-	World	765.7	100%
1	United States	377.0	49.24%
-	Indo-Pacific	183.0	23.90%
-	Europe and Central Asia	109.3	14.27%
2	China	88.8	11.60%
-	Latin America and the Caribbean	76.4	9.98%
-	European Union	73.6	9.61%
3	Mexico	47.3	6.18%
4	Germany	23.8	3.11%
5	Japan	21.4	2.79%
6	South Korea	16.9	2.21%
7	Vietnam	14.7	1.92%
8	Italy	12.5	1.63%
9	Brazil	10.2	1.33%
10	France	9.9	1.29%
-	Africa	9.5	1.24%
-	Middle East	4.9	0.64%

== See also ==
- List of the largest trading partners of Australia
- List of the largest trading partners of the ASEAN
- List of the largest trading partners of China
- List of the largest trading partners of the European Union
  - List of the largest trading partners of Germany
  - List of the largest trading partners of Italy
  - List of the largest trading partners of the Netherlands
- List of the largest trading partners of India
- List of the largest trading partners of Russia
- List of the largest trading partners of United Kingdom
- List of the largest trading partners of the United States
- List of the largest trading partners of South Korea
