= List of the largest trading partners of Bangladesh =

This is a list of the largest trading partners of Bangladesh based on data from The Observatory of Economic Complexity (OEC).

Export in billion US-dollar
Rank	Country	Export (2016)
1.	United States	6.10
2.	Germany	5.49
3.	United Kingdom	3.52
4.	France	2.73
5.	Spain	2.52
6.	Italy	1.46
7.	Japan	1.22
8.	Canada	1.21
9.	Belgium; Luxembourg	1.16
10.	Netherlands	1.10
11.	India	1.02
12.	Turkey	0.87
13.	China	0.86
14.	Russia	0.67
15.	Denmark	0.67
16.	Australia	0.66
17.	Poland	0.66
18.	Sweden	0.46
19.	Switzerland	0.45
20.	Czech Republic	0.39

Import in billion US-dollar
Rank	Country	Import (2016)
1.	China	14.30
2.	India	5.57
3.	Singapore	2.47
4.	Japan	1.54
5.	Hong Kong	1.49
6.	Indonesia	1.27
7.	Malaysia	1.24
8.	South Korea	1.16
9.	Brazil	1.09
10.	Thailand	0.93
11.	Taiwan	0.92
12.	United States	0.88
13.	Germany	0.70
14.	Pakistan	0.66
15.	Australia	0.61
16.	Canada	0.58
17.	United Arab Emirates	0.57
18.	Italy	0.52
19.	Argentina	0.49
20.	Russia	0.45

Total Trade in billion US-dollar
Rank	Country	Total Trade (2016)
1.	China	15.16
2.	United States	6.98
3.	India	6.59
4.	Germany	6.19
5.	United Kingdom	3.80

== See also ==
- Economy of Bangladesh
- List of the largest trading partners of the United States
- List of the largest trading partners of China
- List of the largest trading partners of Russia
- List of the largest trading partners of Germany
- List of the largest trading partners of the European Union
