= List of the largest trading partners of Japan =

The following is a list of the 15 largest trading partners of Japan.

These figures do not include services or foreign direct investment, but only trade in goods. The fifteen largest Japanese trading partners with their total trade (sum of imports and exports) in billions of US dollars for calendar year 2021 are as follows:

Rank	Country/District	Exports	Imports	Total trade	Trade balance
–	World	719.1	787.5	1,506.6	−68.4
1	China	126.5	174.2	300.7	−47.8
2	United States	144.2	82.5	226.6	61.7
–	ASEAN	105.1	120.9	226.0	−15.8
–	European Union	74.0	80.7	154.7	−6.7
–	Gulf Cooperation Council	22.0	93.5	115.5	−71.5
3	Australia	16.8	65.3	82.1	−48.5
4	Taiwan	43.0	35.7	78.7	7.3
5	South Korea	47.0	31.1	78.1	16.0
6	Thailand	29.4	25.8	55.2	3.6
7	United Arab Emirates	10.4	37.0	47.4	−26.6
8	Vietnam	17.2	25.9	43.0	−8.7
9	Germany	19.4	22.5	41.9	−3.1
10	Saudi Arabia	6.4	34.8	41.1	−28.4
11	Indonesia	14.5	24.5	38.9	−10.0
12	Malaysia	14.0	20.2	34.2	−6.2
13	Hong Kong	32.6	1.5	34.1	31.0
14	Singapore	18.9	8.6	27.5	10.2
15	Canada	10.9	14.5	25.5	−3.6

Japan is also the dominant export partner of the following:

Exports
Region	Percentage
Palau	77.2%
Kiribati	31.8%
Brunei	25.6%

== See also ==
- Economy of Japan
- List of the largest trading partners of the United States
- List of the largest trading partners of China
- List of the largest trading partners of Russia
- List of the largest trading partners of Germany
- List of the largest trading partners of the European Union
- List of the largest trading partners of South Korea
