= 2025 United States proposed tariffs against the European Union =

2025 United States tariffs against the European Union
- Part of Tariffs in the second Trump administration
- Date: February 26, 2025 – present (1 year and 8 months)
- Location: United States; European Union
- Status: Ongoing: United States tariffs on the European Union announced on February 26

Parties
United States	European Union

Lead figures
(United States) Donald Trump (United States) Howard Lutnick	(European Union) António Costa (European Union) Ursula von der Leyen

On February 26, 2025, United States President Donald Trump announced his administration's plan to impose a 25% tariff on goods imported from the European Union. The announcement came after several protectionist trade policy announcements from the Trump administration.

== Background ==
The European Union represents the United States' largest trading partner. According to economic analysts, broad tariffs on European Union goods would potentially impact hundreds of billions of dollars in trade between the United States and European nations.

The threatened European Union tariffs came amid a broader pattern of protectionist trade policy announcements from the Trump administration in early 2025. Before the European Union announcement, the administration had already declared plans to implement 25% tariffs on the United States' two largest trading partners, Canada and Mexico.

== U.S. general tariff threats ==
During his February 26 cabinet meeting, President Trump declared that his administration had "made a decision" regarding trade policy with the European Union and would be "announcing it very soon." He specified a planned tariff rate against European Union imports of 25% that would be applied "generally", mentioning automobile manufacturers as potential targets. During his remarks, President Trump characterized the European Union as having been "formed to screw the United States".

=== Potential impact ===
According to European Union estimates, the impact of proposed 2025 tariffs would be approximately four times larger than those imposed in 2018, potentially European Union officials noted that the expected impact of approximately €28 billion would be roughly four times larger than the previous round of metal sector tariffs. European Commissioner for Trade and Economic Security Maroš Šefčovič indicated that the situation remained fluid, with potential changes to the details and scope of the tariffs still possible before implementation. The STOXX Europe 600 index fell 0.8% following the announcement.

The Kiel Institute for the World Economy estimated that the tariffs would cause the European Union economy to contract by 0.4% and the United States economy to contract by 0.17%.

== U.S. metal tariffs ==
On March 12, 2025, the U.S. imposed 25% tariffs on all imports of steel and aluminum, renewing and increasing tariffs he first enacted in 2018. Commerce Secretary Howard Lutnick stated the U.S.'s goal was nurturing "a big, strong domestic steel and aluminum capability" and that Trump would soon add a tariff on copper as well. The EU announced retaliatory measures the same day.

On April 1, the EU plans to reinstate tariffs originally imposed in 2018 and 2020 as a reaction to Trump's first-term metal tariffs. These measures, worth €6.3 billion in 2018 but €4.5 billion in 2025 due to Brexit and reduced U.S. trade, were suspended in 2023 after negotiations with President Biden.

By mid-April, the EU intends to implement additional measures targeting €18 billion of U.S. industrial and agricultural goods, including steel, aluminum, home appliances, wood products, poultry, beef, and other food imports. The UK refrained from retaliation. United States Trade Representative Jamieson Greer bemoaned that the European Union's retaliatory tariffs "completely disregards the national security imperatives of the United States – and indeed international security – and is yet another indicator that the EU's trade and economic policies are out of step with reality".

On March 13, 2025, Trump criticized the EU for imposing a 50% tariff on U.S. whiskey and threatened to retaliate with 200% tariffs on alcohol from the European Union.

== See also ==
- 2025–2026 Canada–United States trade war
- 2025–2026 Mexico–United States trade war
- China–United States trade war
- Tariffs in the second Trump administration
- List of the largest trading partners of the United States
- List of the largest trading partners of China
- List of largest trading partners of India
