= List of exports of the United States =

Exports of the United States by product category (2019) Chemical products Transportation Machines Mineral products Plastics and rubbers Metals Foodstuffs Precious metals Textiles Instruments Animal products Vegetable products Paper goods Footwear and headwear Miscellaneous Stone and glass Wood products Animal and vegetable bi-products Animal hides Arts and antiques Weapons

The following is a list and analysis of exports from the United States in United States dollars. The United States exported $3,051.8 billion worth of goods and services in 2023, up $396.4 billion from 2022. Exports of goods decreased by $37.2 billion while exports of services increased by $70.6 billion. The trade deficit in terms of goods decreased by $123.4 billion from 2022, making it $1,059.6 billion in 2023. For services, this increased by $48 billion, making it $279.8 billion in 2023.

The large decline in exports in 2020 has been attributed to the effects of COVID-19 pandemic. Some key highlights of the 2020 data are:

- Exports of goods decreased $217.7 billion to $1,434.8 billion in 2020.
- Weapons sales increased to $205 billion
  - Capital goods decreased $87.5 billion.
    - Civilian aircraft decreased $27.4 billion.
    - Civilian aircraft engines decreased $18.4 billion.
  - Industrial supplies and materials decreased $59.2 billion.
    - Other petroleum products decreased $15.5 billion.
    - Crude oil decreased $14.8 billion.
    - Fuel oil decreased $13.3 billion.
  - Automotive vehicles, parts, and engines decreased $35.3 billion.
    - Automotive parts and accessories decreased $13.3 billion.
    - Passenger cars decreased $10.5 billion.
  - Consumer goods decreased $30.8 billion.
    - Gem diamonds decreased $8.5 billion.
    - Artwork, antiques and other collectibles decreased $4.5 billion.
    - Jewelry decreased $4.4 billion.
- Exports of services decreased $178.7 billion to $697.1 billion in 2021.
  - Travel decreased $117.2 billion.
  - Transport decreased $34.7 billion.

== List of top exports by year ==
List of #1 U.S. Exports by Year
Source: World Bank
Year	Top Export
1991	Aircraft
1992	Aircraft
1993	Aircraft
1994	Integrated Circuits
1995	Integrated Circuits
1996	Integrated Circuits
1997	Integrated Circuits
1998	Aircraft
1999	Integrated Circuits
2000	Integrated Circuits
2001	Integrated Circuits
2002	Integrated Circuits
2003	Integrated Circuits
2004	Integrated Circuits
2005	Integrated Circuits
2006	Aircraft
2007	Aircraft
2008	Petroleum / Oil
2009	Petroleum / Oil
2010	Petroleum / Oil
2011	Petroleum / Oil
2012	Petroleum / Oil
2013	Petroleum / Oil
2014	Petroleum / Oil
2015	Petroleum / Oil
2016	Petroleum / Oil
2017	Petroleum / Oil
2018	Petroleum / Oil
2019	Petroleum / Oil
2020	Petroleum / Oil
2021	Petroleum / Oil
2022	Petroleum / Oil

== Exports of goods ==
U.S. Exports of Goods by End-Use Category and Commodity
In millions of dollars. Details may not equal totals due to seasonal adjustment and rounding.
#	Item	2021	2020	2019	Change 2019-20
	Total, Balance of Payments Basis	1,761,967	1,434,768	1,652,437	-217,669
	Net Adjustments	7,390	3,129	9,276	-6,147
	Total, Census Basis	1,754,578	1,431,638	1,643,161	-211,522
1	Foods, feeds, and beverages	165,244	139,775	131,103	8,672
	Soybeans	28,552	26,921	19,642	7,279
	Corn	19,895	10,159	8,620	1,540
	Sorghum, barley, oats	2,145	1,471	622	849
	Animal feeds, n.e.c.	11,002	9,389	8,793	596
	Dairy products and eggs	6,559	5,454	4,961	493
	Meat, poultry, etc.	25,127	20,502	20,262	241
	Oilseeds, food oils	3,049	2,724	2,496	228
	Wheat	7,438	6,467	6,413	54
	Nonagricultural foods, etc.	437	439	397	42
	Rice	2,048	2,016	1,998	18
	Other foods	17,595	15,655	15,691	-36
	Alcoholic beverages, excluding wine	1,934	2,012	2,084	-72
	Wine, beer, and related products	2,258	2,034	2,164	-130
	Vegetables	7,177	6,822	7,021	-199
	Fruits, frozen juices	8,691	8,118	8,403	-284
	Bakery products	6,255	5,740	6,246	-506
	Nuts	9,639	9,278	9,844	-566
	Fish and shellfish	5,441	4,573	5,446	-873
2	Industrial supplies and materials	635,558	470,567	529,782	-59,215
	Petroleum products, other	63,861	40,463	55,965	-15,502
	Crude oil	69,317	50,216	65,016	-14,799
	Fuel oil	32,115	27,610	40,919	-13,309
	Plastic materials	43,719	34,294	37,459	-3,165
	Metallurgical grade coal	7,418	4,554	7,435	-2,882
	Finished metal shapes	22,116	17,711	20,038	-2,327
	Other industrial supplies	30,101	25,599	27,708	-2,109
	Chemicals-organic	33,904	26,677	28,668	-1,990
	Nonferrous metals, other	7,251	6,198	8,006	-1,808
	Iron and steel mill products	6,314	6,564	7,910	-1,346
	Natural gas liquids	30,791	16,218	17,530	-1,312
	Aluminum and alumina	8,338	6,151	7,363	-1,212
	Coal and fuels, other	7,340	5,449	6,502	-1,054
	Newsprint	13,255	11,734	12,754	-1,020
	Iron and steel products, other	9,813	5,276	6,290	-1,014
	Manmade cloth	6,332	5,644	6,610	-966
	Steelmaking materials	10,446	6,936	7,898	-962
	Pulpwood and woodpulp	9,689	7,632	8,489	-857
	Mineral supplies-manufactured	6,901	5,928	6,777	-849
	Cotton fiber cloth	1,725	1,266	2,083	-817
	Copper	9,966	6,388	7,007	-619
	Shingles, molding, wallboard	4,917	4,050	4,602	-553
	Industrial rubber products	4,575	4,094	4,625	-530
	Synthetic rubber-primary	3,405	2,584	3,084	-500
	Chemicals-inorganic	10,902	9,019	9,483	-464
	Logs and lumber	6,425	4,842	5,231	-389
	Chemicals-fertilizers	9,217	8,310	8,673	-363
	Finished textile supplies	2,996	2,595	2,941	-346
	Chemicals-other	39,196	33,100	33,347	-247
	Electric energy	504	197	436	-238
	Leather and furs	788	551	774	-224
	Hides and skins	1,193	839	1,049	-210
	Agric. farming-unmanufactured	5,434	3,150	3,358	-208
	Nonmetallic minerals	922	619	792	-172
	Cotton, raw	5,725	5,978	6,149	-171
	Glass-plate, sheet, etc.	1,329	1,193	1,339	-146
	Wood supplies, manufactured	1,297	992	1,124	-132
	Hair, waste materials	594	481	598	-117
	Nontextile floor tiles	7,508	430	529	-99
	Tapes, audio and visual	124	94	165	-71
	Tobacco, unmanufactured	834	678	741	-64
	Agriculture-manufactured, other	4,119	3,485	3,376	109
	Nuclear fuel materials	871	791	584	207
	Agric. industry-unmanufactured	5,434	4,294	4,023	271
	Gas-natural	39,755	18,672	15,426	3,246
	Nonmonetary gold	30,870	23,278	18,669	4,608
	Precious metals, other	24,929	17,744	10,238	7,506
3	Capital goods, except automotive	519,606	460,365	547,869	-87,504
	Civilian aircraft	24,247	16,555	44,004	-27,449
	Engines-civilian aircraft	37,427	37,312	55,737	-18,425
	Parts-civilian aircraft	17,835	17,714	26,175	-8,461
	Computer accessories	29,087	25,182	30,549	-5,367
	Electric apparatus	42,837	38,285	43,566	-5,281
	Telecommunications equipment	32,573	31,038	35,789	-4,751
	Industrial engines	23,257	21,580	24,720	-3,140
	Measuring, testing, control instruments	24,051	22,288	25,311	-3,023
	Drilling & oilfield equipment	2,466	2,785	5,412	-2,627
	Photo, service industry machinery	9,129	7,786	10,216	-2,430
	Excavating machinery	10,477	9,019	10,647	-1,629
	Materials handling equipment	12,049	10,588	12,152	-1,563
	Medical equipment	39,846	36,928	38,487	-1,560
	Metalworking machine tools	6,264	5,094	6,497	-1,403
	Agricultural machinery, equipment	8,069	6,453	7,426	-974
	Generators, accessories	12,442	11,426	12,346	-920
	Railway transportation equipment	2,835	2,928	3,777	-849
	Wood, glass, plastic	4,645	3,516	4,104	-588
	Nonfarm tractors and parts	3,155	2,847	3,276	-430
	Computers	17,462	15,946	16,343	-397
	Business machines and equipment	2,008	1,891	2,238	-347
	Food, tobacco machinery	3,639	3,319	3,643	-324
	Specialized mining	951	858	1,147	-289
	Textile, sewing machines	1,076	821	1,079	-259
	Marine engines, parts	1,146	1,035	1,284	-250
	Pulp and paper machinery	2,172	2,042	2,245	-203
	Laboratory testing instruments	13,444	11,967	12,170	-202
	Vessels, excluding scrap	78	36	135	-99
	Commercial vessels, other	339	355	328	26
	Spacecraft, excluding military	62	216	71	145
	Industrial machines, other	68,440	57,348	57,164	184
	Semiconductors	66,098	55,207	49,828	5,380
4	Automotive vehicles, parts, and engines	143,603	127,207	162,468	-35,261
	Other parts and accessories of vehicles	47,411	44,750	58,076	-13,326
	Passenger cars, new and used	53,664	44,891	55,436	-10,545
	Trucks, buses, and special purpose vehicles	20,880	17,285	23,514	-6,230
	Engines and engine parts	18,554	17,054	21,377	-4,323
	Automotive tires and tubes	2,861	2,574	3,381	-807
	Bodies and chassis for passenger cars	233	653	683	-30
5	Consumer goods	222,082	174,862	205,681	-30,819
	Gem diamonds	16,676	11,632	20,101	-8,469
	Artwork, antiques, stamps, etc.	8,720	8,248	12,719	-4,471
	Jewelry, etc.	9,245	6,957	11,388	-4,431
	Cell phones and other household goods, n.e.c.	30,184	24,230	27,454	-3,223
	Televisions and video equipment	2,584	2,480	4,149	-1,668
	Toiletries and cosmetics	13,237	12,480	13,748	-1,269
	Toys, games, and sporting goods	10,879	8,141	9,257	-1,117
	Pharmaceutical preparations	83,339	59,362	60,375	-1,013
	Apparel, household goods - textile	7,402	6,113	6,984	-871
	Furniture, household goods, etc.	4,814	4,174	4,888	-714
	Apparel, household goods-nontextile	2,822	2,513	3,218	-706
	Tobacco, manufactured	322	349	1,048	-699
	Books, printed matter	4,136	3,556	4,156	-600
	Other consumer nondurables	7,023	6,468	6,917	-449
	Household appliances	6,966	5,775	6,148	-372
	Pleasure boats and motors	2,649	2,145	2,462	-317
	Musical instruments	2,113	1,802	2,072	-270
	Recorded media	1,446	1,326	1,563	-237
	Sports apparel and gear	811	679	842	-163
	Rugs	771	748	907	-158
	Cookware, cutlery, tools	1,257	1,033	1,160	-127
	Glassware, chinaware	572	476	558	-82
	Nursery stock, etc.	519	428	457	-30
	Stereo equipment, etc.	2,368	2,299	2,040	259
	Numismatic coins	1,230	1,450	1,072	378
6	Other goods	68,485	58,863	66,258	-7,395

== Export of services ==
U.S. Exports of Services by Major Category
In millions of dollars. Details may not equal totals due to seasonal adjustment and rounding.
Item	2023	2022	2021	2020	2019
Total Services	1,026,596	924,168	766,570	697,131	875,825
Other Business Services	253,190	243,896	210,017	185,682	189,441
Financial Services	175,461	166,237	162,040	135,813	135,698
Charges for the Use of Intellectual Property n.i.e.	134,442	126,878	120,721	115,329	117,401
Travel (1)	189,134	133,966	68,278	76,127	193,315
Transport	97,779	90,033	63,903	56,378	91,092
Telecommunications, Computer, and Information Services	70,629	69,448	58,683	54,269	55,657
Government Goods and Services n.i.e.	32,767	30,010	23,118	23,125	22,555
Personal, Cultural, and Recreational Services	30,732	26,439	23,291	18,204	23,372
Maintenance and Repair Services n.i.e.	15,948	14,236	11,921	15,140	27,868
Insurance Services	24,985	21,346	21,640	14,725	16,238
Construction	1,529	1,680	2,957	2,339	3,189
Note – n.i.e. -Not included elsewhere (1) All travel purposes include 1) business travel, including expenditures by border, seasonal, and other short-term workers and 2) personal travel, including health-related and education-related travel

== Exports of goods and services ==
=== By year ===
In billions of dollars. Not seasonally adjusted nor filtered by any industry. Done annually. 1980-2023
Year	Exports	Year	Exports
2023	3027.243	2001	1026.812
2022	2995.046	2000	1096.111
2021	2550.038	1999	992.910
2020	2150.112	1998	952.979
2019	2538.450	1997	953.803
2018	2538.089	1996	867.589
2017	2388.260	1995	812.810
2016	2235.558	1994	720.937
2015	2270.622	1993	654.799
2014	2378.545	1992	633.053
2013	2287.922	1991	594.931
2012	2217.700	1990	551.873
2011	2115.864	1989	504.289
2010	1857.247	1988	444.601
2009	1582.774	1987	363.943
2008	1835.280	1986	320.998
2007	1659.295	1985	303.211
2006	1470.170	1984	302.380
2005	1301.580	1983	276.996
2004	1176.363	1982	283.210
2003	1035.165	1981	305.239
2002	997.979	1980	280.772

== See also ==
- List of imports of the United States
- Economy of the United States
- Foreign trade of the United States
- List of U.S. states and territories by exports
- List of the largest trading partners of the United States
