= Foreign trade of the United States =

Exports of the United States by product category (2019) Chemical products Transportation Machines Mineral products Plastics and rubbers Metals Foodstuffs Precious metals Textiles Instruments Animal products Vegetable products Paper goods Footwear and headwear Miscellaneous Stone and glass Wood products Animal and vegetable bi-products Animal hides Arts and antiques Weapons

The regulation of foreign trade is constitutionally vested in the United States Congress. After the Great Depression, the country emerged as among the most significant global trade policy-makers, and it is now a partner to a number of international trade agreements, including the General Agreement on Tariffs and Trade (GATT) and the World Trade Organization (WTO). Gross U.S. assets held by foreigners were $16.3 trillion as of the end of 2006 (over 100% of GDP).

The United States is among the top three global importers and exporters. The country has trade relations with many other countries. Within that, the trade with Europe and Asia is predominant. To fulfill the demands of the industrial sector, the country has to import mineral oil and iron ore on a large scale. Machinery, cotton yarn, toys, mineral oil, lubricants, steel, tea, sugar, coffee, and many more items are traded. The country's export list includes food grains like wheat, corn, and soybeans, as well as aeroplanes, cars, computers, paper, and machine tools required for different industries. On a seasonally adjusted balance-of-payments basis, U.S. exports of goods and services totaled $3.4323 trillion in 2025, while imports totaled $4.3338 trillion, producing a goods and services deficit of $901.5 billion. The goods deficit was $1.2409 trillion and was partly offset by a $339.5 billion services surplus.

Relatively few U.S. companies export; a 2009 study reported that 18% of U.S. manufacturers export their goods. Exporting is concentrated to a small number of companies: the largest 1% of U.S. companies that export comprise 81% of U.S. exports.

== Institutional framework ==
=== Congressional authority over international trade ===
The authority of Congress to regulate international trade is set out in the United States Constitution (Article I, Section 8, Paragraph 1):

The Congress shall have power To lay and collect Taxes, Duties, Imposts and Excises, to pay the Debts and provide for the common Defence and to promote the general Welfare of the United States; but all Duties, Imposts and Excises shall be uniform throughout the United States

Congressional authority over international trade includes the power to impose tariffs and to establish tariff rates; implementing trade agreements; providing remedies against unfairly traded imports; controlling the export of sensitive technology and extending tariff preferences to imports from developing countries. Over time, and under carefully prescribed circumstances, Congress has delegated some of its trade authority to the Executive Branch. Congress, however, has, in some cases, kept tight reins on the use of this authority by requiring that certain trade laws and programs be renewed; and by requiring the Executive Branch to issue reports to Congress so the latter can monitor the implementation of the trade laws and programs.

=== Internal institutions ===
American foreign trade is regulated internally by:

- United States Court of International Trade
- United States International Trade Commission

== History ==
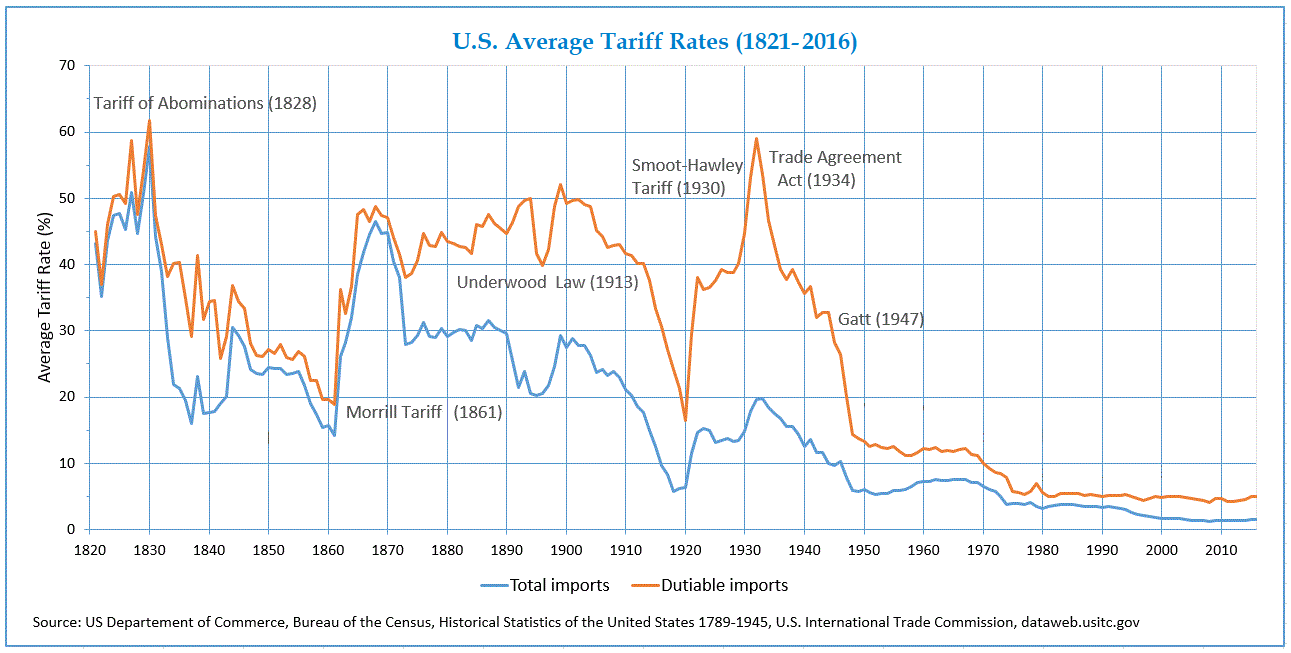
Average tariff rates in U.S. (1821–2016)

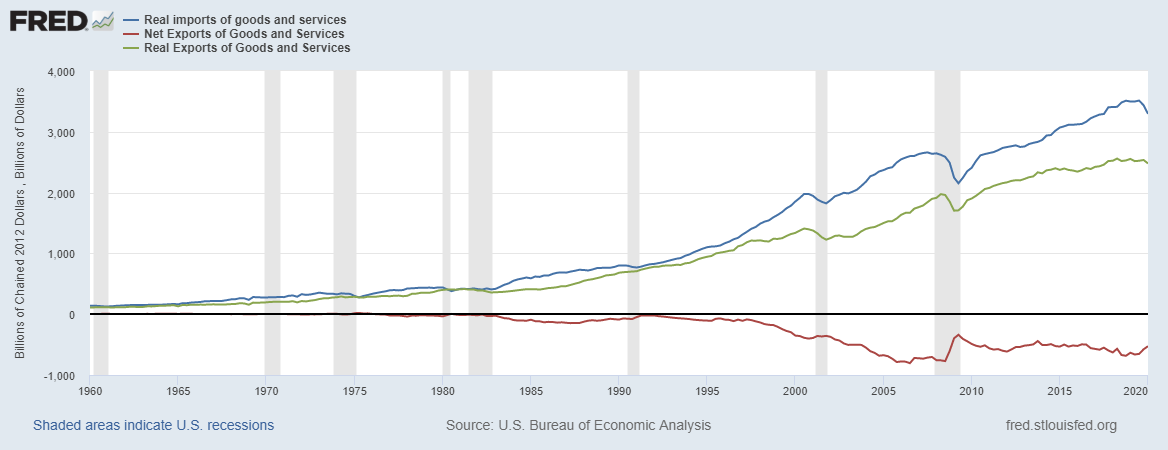
Imports vs exports & net imports

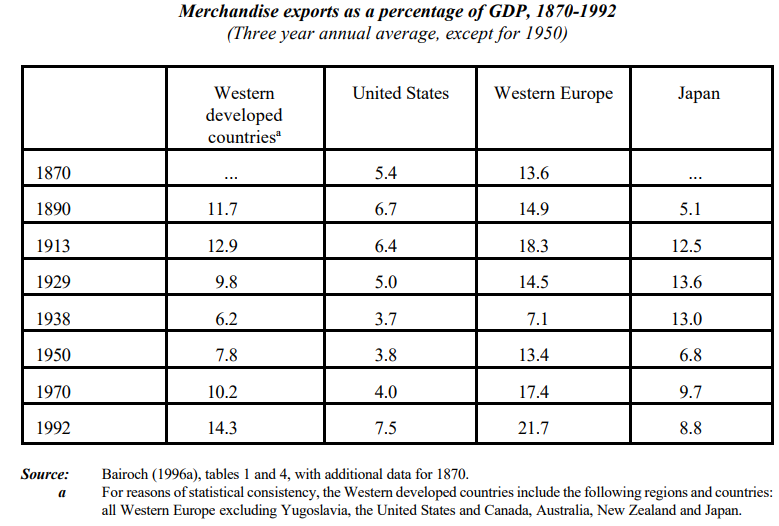
Merchandise exports (1870–1992)

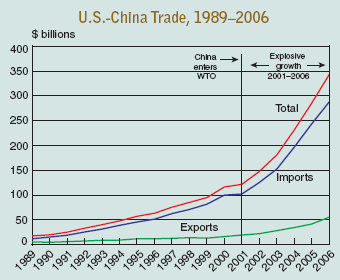
China gains entry to the WTO as most favoured nation in early 2000s.

United States trade policy has varied widely through various American historical and industrial periods. As a major developed nation, the U.S. has relied heavily on the import of raw materials and the export of finished goods. Because of the significance for American economy and industry, much weight has been placed on trade policy by elected officials and business leaders.

According to economic historian Douglas Irwin, tariffs have historically served three main purposes: generating revenue for the federal government, restricting imports to protect domestic producers, and securing reciprocity through trade agreements that reduce barriers. The history of U.S. trade policy can be divided into three distinct eras, each characterized by the predominance of one goal. From 1790 to 1860, revenue considerations dominated, as import duties accounted for approximately 90% of federal government receipts. From 1861 to 1933, the growing reliance on domestic taxation shifted the focus of tariffs toward protecting domestic industries. From 1934 to 2016, the primary objective of trade policy became the negotiation of trade agreements with other countries. The three eras of U.S. tariff history were separated by two major shocks—the Civil War and the Great Depression—that realigned political power and shifted trade policy objectives.

Political support by members of Congress often reflects the economic interests of producers rather than consumers, as producers tend to be better organized politically and employ many voting workers. Trade-related interests differ across industries, depending on whether they focus on exports or face import competition. In general, workers in export-oriented sectors favor lower tariffs, while those in import-competing industries support higher tariffs.

Because congressional representation is geographically based, regional economic interests tend to shape consistent voting patterns over time. For much of U.S. history, the primary division over trade policy has been along the North–South axis. In the early 19th century, a manufacturing corridor developed in the Northeast, including textile production in New England and iron industries in Pennsylvania and Ohio, which often faced import competition. By contrast, the South specialized in agricultural exports such as cotton and tobacco.

In more recent times, representatives from the Rust Belt—spanning from Upstate New York through the industrial Midwest—have often opposed trade agreements, while those from the South and the West have generally supported them. The regional variation in trade-related interests implies that political parties may adopt opposing positions on trade policy when their electoral bases differ geographically. Each of the three trade policy eras—focused respectively on revenue, restriction, and reciprocity—occurred during periods of political dominance by a single party able to implement its preferred policies.

During the Civil War, leaders of the Confederacy were confident that Britain would come to their aid because of British reliance on Southern cotton. The Union was able to avoid this, through skillful use of diplomacy and threats to other aspects of European-U.S. trade relations.

The 1920s marked a decade of economic growth in the United States following a Classical supply side policy. U.S. President Warren Harding signed the Emergency Tariff of 1921 and the Fordney–McCumber Tariff of 1922. Harding's policies reduced taxes and protected U.S. business and agriculture. Following the Great Depression and World War II, the United Nations Monetary and Financial Conference brought the Bretton Woods currency agreement followed by the economy of the 1950s and 1960s. In 1971, President Richard Nixon ended U.S. ties to Bretton Woods, leaving the U.S. with a floating fiat currency. The stagflation of the 1970s saw a U.S. economy characterized by slower GDP growth. In 1988, the United States ranked first in the world in the Economist Intelligence Unit "quality of life index" and third in the Economic Freedom of the World Index.

Near the end of the Second World War U.S. policy makers began to experiment on a broader level. In the 1940s, working with the British government, the United States developed two innovations to expand and govern trade among nations: the General Agreement on Tariffs and Trade (GATT) and the International Trade Organization (ITO). GATT was a temporary multilateral agreement designed to provide a framework of rules and a forum to negotiate trade barrier reductions among nations.

The growing importance of international trade led to the establishment of the Office of the U.S. Trade Representative in 1963 by Executive Order 11075, originally called The Office of the Special Representative for Trade Negotiations.

In 2013 the United States' largest trading partner was Canada.

In 2018, the year that a trade war with China was launched by U.S. President Donald Trump, the U.S. trade deficit in goods reached $891 billion, which was the largest on record before the $1,183 billion deficit in the trade of goods recorded in 2021. By the end of the Trump presidency, the trade war was widely characterized as a failure.

On July 27, 2025, the United States and the European Union concluded a trade agreement, providing for 15% tariffs on European exports. The deal was announced by President Donald Trump and President of the European Commission, Ursula von der Leyen, at Turnberry, Scotland. European states committed to $750 billion in energy purchases and $600 billion in additional investments in the United States.

== Recent U.S. Tariff policy developments ==
In January 2026, U.S. President Donald Trump threatened to impose a 100 percent tariff on Canadian imports if Canada proceeded with a potential trade agreement involving the People’s Republic of China. Trump stated that Canada could serve as a conduit for Chinese goods entering the U.S. market, and indicated that tariffs could be imposed immediately. The announcement occurred amid ongoing tensions in U.S.–Canada trade relations and broader discussions over trade policies with China. Canadian officials clarified that Ottawa was not pursuing a comprehensive free trade agreement with China, and noted that recent discussions were limited to addressing specific tariff issues.

In May 2026, tariffs on imported cars were increased from 15% to 25% under the Trump administration. The measure affected European exporters, particularly Germany, whose automotive industry plays a major role in its economy. The Kiel Institute for the World Economy estimated that the tariffs could reduce Germany’s economic output by about €15 billion (around $18 billion) in the long term.

== Balance of trade ==
The US last had a trade surplus in 1975. In 1985, the United States began running a persistent trade deficit with China. During the 1990s, the overall U.S. trade deficit expanded, particularly with Asian economies. By 2012, the U.S. trade deficit, along with the federal budget deficit and public debt, reached record or near-record levels.

Though the U.S. trade deficit has been stubborn, and tends to be the largest by dollar volume of any nation, even the most extreme months as measured by percent of GDP there are nations that are far more noteworthy. Case in point, post 2015 Nepal earthquake, Nepal's trade gap (in goods & services) was a shocking 33.3% of GDP although heavy remittances considerably offset that number. According to the U.S. Department of Commerce Bureau of Economic Analysis (BEA), January 27, 2017, report, the GDP "increased 4.0 percent, or $185.5 billion, in the fourth quarter of 2016 to a level of $18,860.8 billion."

Over the long run, nations with trade surpluses tend also to have a savings surplus. The U.S. generally has developed lower savings rates than its trading partners, which have tended to have trade surpluses. Germany, France, Japan, and Canada have maintained higher savings rates than the U.S. over the long run.

According to Carla Norrlöf, there are three main benefits to trade deficits for the United States:

1. Greater consumption than production: the US enjoys the better side of the bargain by being able to consume more than it produces
2. Usage of efficiently produced foreign-made intermediate goods is productivity-enhancing for US firms: the US makes the most effective use of the global division of labor
3. A large market that other countries are reliant on for exports enhances American bargaining power in trade negotiations

== Investment in the United States ==
Gross U.S. assets held by foreigners were $16.3 trillion as of the end of 2006 (over 100% of GDP). The U.S. net international investment position (NIIP) became a negative $2.5 trillion at the end of 2006, or about minus 19% of GDP.

This figure rises as long as the U.S. maintains an imbalance in trade, when the value of imports substantially outweighs the value of exports. This external debt does not result mostly from loans to Americans or the American government, nor is it consumer debt owed to non-U.S. creditors. It is an accounting entry that largely represents U.S. domestic assets purchased with trade dollars and owned overseas, largely by U.S. trading partners.

For countries like the United States, a large net external debt is created when the value of foreign assets (debt and equity) held by domestic residents is less than the value of domestic assets held by foreigners. In simple terms, as foreigners buy property in the U.S., this adds to the external debt. When this occurs in greater amounts than Americans buying property overseas, nations like the United States are said to be debtor nations, but this is not conventional debt like a loan obtained from a bank.

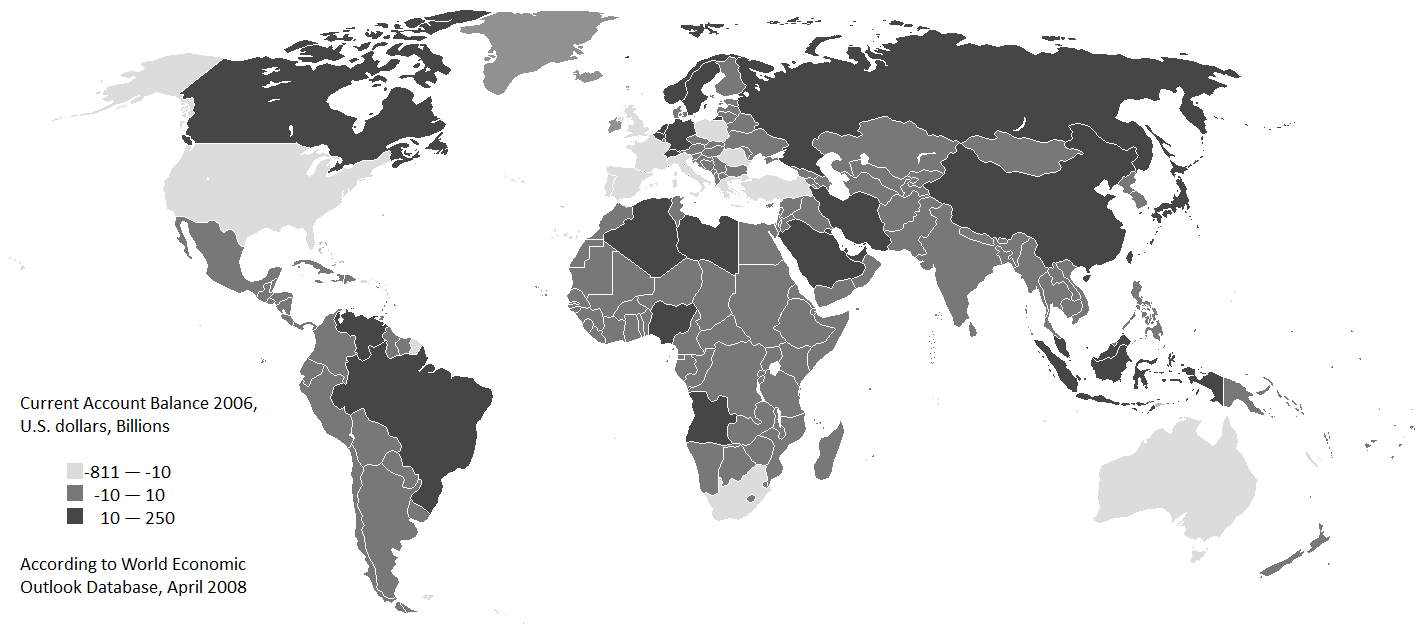
Account balance as of 2006

If the external debt represents foreign ownership of domestic assets, the result is that rental income, stock dividends, capital gains and other investment income is received by foreign investors, rather than by U.S. residents. On the other hand, when American debt is held by overseas investors, they receive interest and principal repayments. As the trade imbalance puts extra dollars in hands outside of the U.S., these dollars may be used to invest in new assets (foreign direct investment, such as new plants) or be used to buy existing American assets such as stocks, real estate and bonds. With a mounting trade deficit, the income from these assets increasingly transfers overseas.

According to economists such as Larry Summers and Paul Krugman, the enormous inflow of capital from China was one of the causes of the 2008 financial crisis. China had been buying huge quantities of dollar assets to keep its currency value low and its export economy humming, which caused American interest rates and saving rates to remain artificially low. These low interest rates, in turn, contributed to the United States housing bubble because when mortgages are cheap, house prices are inflated as people can afford to borrow more.

== Trade agreements ==
United States Free-trade areas

The United States is a partner to many trade agreements, shown in the chart below and the map to the right.

The United States has also negotiated many Trade and Investment Framework Agreements, which are often precursors to free trade agreements. It has also negotiated many bilateral investment treaties, which concern the movement of capital rather than goods.

The U.S. is a member of several international trade organizations. The purpose of joining these organizations is to come to agreement with other nations on trade issues, although there is domestic political controversy to whether or not the U.S. government should be making these trade agreements in the first place. These organizations include:

- World Trade Organization
- Organization of American States
- Security and Prosperity Partnership of North America

As of February 26, 2022, the United States has barred most Russian imports, including semiconductors, lasers, liquor, computers, etc. due to the Russian invasion of Ukraine. This is the biggest bar on imports in the U.S. since WWII. The U.S. and Canada partnered on the ban of liquor and food stuff on February 25, 2022, after it was announced that Russian troops had taken Chernobyl Nuclear Power Plant.

== Customs territory ==
The main customs territory of the United States includes the 50 states, the District of Columbia, and the U.S Commonwealth of Puerto Rico, with the exception of over 200 foreign trade zones designated to encourage economic activity. People and goods entering this territory are subject to inspection by U.S. Customs and Border Protection. The remaining insular areas are separate customs territories administered largely by local authorities:

- American Samoa
- Guam
- Northern Mariana Islands
- United States Minor Outlying Islands (mostly uninhabited)
- United States Virgin Islands

Transportation of certain living things or agricultural products may be prohibited even within a customs territory. This is enforced by U.S. Customs and Border Protection, the federal Animal and Plant Health Inspection Service, and even state authorities such as the California Department of Food and Agriculture.

Items shipped to U.S. territories are not considered exports and are exempt from tariffs, but items shipped to Guam pay a 4% sales or use tax, items shipped to the USVI pay an excise tax (typically 0% to 4%), and Puerto Rico charges a consumption tax of 10.5–11.5%.

ITAR regulations apply only when shipping to outside the United States and its territories, whether from inside or outside the main customs zone.

Shipments from U.S. territories other than Puerto Rico into the main customs territory are considered imports, and are subject to import tariffs, with exceptions on certain goods listed in the Code of Federal Regulations.

== See also ==
- List of imports of the United States
- List of exports of the United States
- List of U.S. states and territories by exports
- List of U.S. states and territories by imports
- Foreign-trade zones of the United States
- Federal Trade Commission Act
- Trade Act of 2002
- Trading with the Enemy Act 1917
- Trade wars
- Tariff in American history
- Mergers and acquisitions
- Ocean freight differential
