= Canada–China trade war =

Economic conflict between 2024 and 2026

- Part of Canada–China relations
- Date: October 1, 2024 – January 16, 2026 (1 year, 107 days)
- Location: Canada and China
- Caused by: Canadian push back against perceived anti-competitive practices and market distortion caused by Chinese government subsidies; Chinese retaliation against alleged discriminatory practices
- Status: Resolved: Canadian tariffs implemented in October 2024; Chinese retaliatory tariffs implemented in March 2025; Both countries reach a preliminary agreement in January 2026

Parties
Canada	China

Lead figures
(Canada) Prime Ministers; Justin Trudeau (until March 2025); Mark Carney (from March 2025)	(China) General Secretary (Note: The CCP General Secretary is head of the CCP Central Financial and Economic Affairs Commission, the top financial & economic decision making body.); Xi Jinping

In October 2024, an economic conflict between Canada and China started. The dispute started from Canadian push back against perceived anti-competitive practices and market distortions caused by Chinese government subsidies. In response, China launched an "anti-discrimination probe," resulting in tariffs that impacted sectors including electric vehicles (EVs), steel, aluminum, and agricultural products.

The conflict arose in late 2024 when Canada implemented a 100% tariff on Chinese EVs and additional duties on steel and aluminum. By March 2025, China retaliated with substantial tariffs on Canadian rapeseed oil, peas, and pork, specifically targeting agricultural exports of Western Canada. The trade war occurred simultaneously with other trade wars both countries were involved in against the United States, including the China–United States trade war and the Canada–United States trade war.

Following a change in Canadian leadership in early 2025, Canadian Prime Minister Mark Carney and CCP General Secretary Xi Jinping held a series of bilateral meetings to improve relations. On 16 January 2026, Carney made a trip to Beijing and announced a preliminary agreement in which Canada would significantly reduce EV tariffs in exchange for China lowering tariffs on Canadian canola oil and suspending tariffs on other agricultural exports. However, Canadian tariffs on Chinese steel still remained in effect.

== Background ==
In August 2024, trade relations between China and Canada deteriorated substantially when Canada announced plans to implement substantial tariffs on various Chinese manufactured goods, following similar protectionist measures previously enacted by the United States and European Union. These Western nations collectively cited concerns regarding Chinese government subsidies providing unfair competitive advantages to Chinese industries.

== Chronology ==
=== 2024 ===
- 1 October: Canada implemented a 100% tariff on Chinese electric vehicles, mirroring similar protectionist measures previously enacted by the United States and European Union.
- 15 October: Canada implemented an additional 25% tariff on Chinese steel and aluminum, citing concerns about market distortion and unfair competition.

=== 2025 ===
- 8 March: China's Customs Tariff Commission of the State Council announced retaliatory tariffs on imports of several Canadian agricultural products, following an "anti-discrimination probe". The products targeted represented significant export sectors for Canadian agricultural producers, particularly in western Canadian provinces where rapeseed production forms a substantial component of agricultural output.
- 20 March: China implemented a 100% tariff against Canadian rapeseed oil, peas, and oilcakes, in addition to a 25% tariff on Canadian "aquatic products" and pork.
- 16 July: Canadian Prime Minister Mark Carney announced that Canada would implement higher tariffs on Chinese steel contained in intermediate goods from additional countries (excluding the U.S.).
- 31 October: Carney attended APEC South Korea 2025 and held a bilateral meeting with Chinese President and CCP General Secretary Xi Jinping to discuss trade-barriers related to agriculture, canola, electric vehicles, and seafood.

=== 2026 ===
- 16 January: Carney made a state visit to China and held a bilateral meeting with Xi. Afterwards, he announced that Canada would lower tariffs on up to 49,000 Chinese EVs per year from 100% to 6.1%. In exchange, China is expected to lower tariffs on Canadian canola oil from 85% to 15% by 1 March, and affirmed that it would not implement anti-discrimination tariffs on Canadian canola meal, lobsters, crabs, and peas from 1 March to the end of 2026. However, Canadian tariffs on Chinese steel will remain in effect.

== Reactions ==
=== Canada ===
Canada justified its tariff implementation as necessary to protect domestic industries from what it considered to be anti-competitive practices and market distortion by China.

=== China ===
China rejected Canada's justification for the tariffs, and instituted retaliatory tariffs following an "anti-discrimination probe" conducted by Chinese officials. The investigation reportedly concluded that Canada's earlier restrictive measures against Chinese products had been implemented without proper investigative procedures.

On 8 March 2025, China's customs authorities released a statement characterizing Canada's actions as having disregarded "objective facts and World Trade Organization rules". The statement specifically outlined what it referred to as discriminatory measures specifically targeting China that infringed on the nation's economic interests while undermining bilateral relations.

=== United States ===
Following the announcement of the trade deal between China and Canada, U.S. Secretary of Transportation Sean Duffy claimed that Canada would regret their decision to relax import restrictions on Chinese EVs. U.S. Trade Representative Jamieson Greer also claimed that Canada would regret their decision and explained that the United States would maintain their tariffs on Chinese EVs due to protectionism and cybersecurity concerns.

U.S. President Donald Trump threatened to impose 100% tariffs on Canada if the deal were to be implemented.

== See also ==
- List of the largest trading partners of Canada
- List of the largest trading partners of China
- Canada–United States trade war
- Australia–China trade war
- China–United States trade war
