= Australia–China trade war =

Economic conflict between 2020–2024

- Part of Australia–China relations
- Date: May 11, 2020 – December 20, 2024 (4 years, 223 days)
- Location: Australia and China
- Caused by: Chinese retaliation against Australian endorsement of an inquiry into the origins of COVID-19
- Status: Resolved: Chinese tariffs and bans implemented in 2020; Chinese tariffs and bans gradually exempted between 2023 and 2024

Parties
Australia	China

Lead figures
(Australia) Prime Ministers; Scott Morrison (until May 2022); Anthony Albanese (from May 2022)	(China) General Secretary (Note: The CCP General Secretary is head of the CCP Central Financial and Economic Affairs Commission, the top financial & economic decision making body.); Xi Jinping

In May 2020, an economic conflict between Australia and China started. Under the Morrison government, Australia called for an international inquiry into the origins of COVID-19. In retaliation, China implemented a series of official sanctions, tariffs and unofficial bans targeting Australian exports including beef, barley, wine, coal, timber, cotton, and lobsters.

The conflict impacted specific firms and sectors within Australia, but did not have a material impact on Australia's overall economy. Australia successfully diverted most targeted goods like coal and barley to other export markets, albeit at lower prices than if they had been sold in China. Several goods, most notably wine, suffered significant losses.

The overall impact on China was limited, with the exception of power production. Chinese power generation is dependent on coal, and the unofficial ban on Australia contributed to a power shortage in Chinese cities throughout 2021.

Australia challenged these measures through the World Trade Organization (WTO). Following a change in Australian government in 2022, the Albanese government began improving relations with China and saw a gradual exemption of trade barriers. In 2023, most restrictions on coal, timber, and barley were lifted. In 2024, the restrictions on wine and beef were lifted. On 20 December 2024, the final restrictions on Australian lobsters were lifted, ending the conflict.

== Background ==
In July 2015, both countries signed the China–Australia Free Trade Agreement.

In November 2018, China's Ministry of Commerce initiated an anti-dumping investigation on Australian barley.

In April 2020, amidst the outbreak of the COVID-19 pandemic, Australia's Minister for Foreign Affairs Marise Payne questioned China's transparency in the origins and spread of COVID-19 and demanded an international investigation. In response to Payne's statement, China's ambassador to Australia, Cheng Jingye, told an Australian newspaper that Australia was treading a "dangerous" path, and suggested a Chinese boycott of Australian exports.

Australia's Department of Foreign Affairs and Trade summoned Cheng to explain his comments. Australian Minister for Trade and Tourism Simon Birmingham responded to Cheng's comments and said that "Australia is no more going to change our policy position on major public health issues because of economic coercion, or threats of economic coercion, than we would change our policy position in matters of national security."

On 29 April 2020, Australia's prime minister Scott Morrison reiterated the call for an investigation into the origins of COVID-19, saying that it was "entirely reasonable and sensible". Morrison earlier had suggested that World Health Organization needed tough "weapons inspector" powers to investigate the cause of the outbreak. These statements particularly angered China and by May 2020, China began imposing trade restrictions on Australia, beginning with Australia's beef exports to China.

== Chronology ==
=== 2020 ===
- 11 May: China suspended beef imports from four Australian meat processors: the Kilcoy Pastoral Company, JBS Beef City, JBS Dinmore, and the Northern Cooperative Meat Company
- 18 May: China's Ministry of Commerce ruled that Australian barley was being dumped and implemented a 80.5% tariff on Australian barley.
- 16 August: China suspended beef imports from the Australian meat processor John Dee.
- 18 August: China's Ministry of Commerce initiated an anti-dumping investigation on wine imports from Australia.
- 31 August: China's General Administration of Customs suspended barley imports from CBH Grain after claiming that contaminants were found.
- 16 October: China ordered cotton mills to suspend imports of Australian cotton.
- 2 November: China confirmed new customs inspections of lobsters, effectively suspending imports of Australian lobsters. It also suspended imports of Australian timber, and barley from Emerald Grain, after claiming that contaminants were found in both.
- 25 November: China confirmed it rejected coal imports for "failing to meet environmental standards," effectively suspending Chinese imports of Australian coal.
- 27 November: China's Ministry of Commerce ruled that Australian wine was being dumped and implemented a 206% tariff on Australian wine.
- 7 December: China suspended beef imports from the Australian meat processor Meramist Pty Ltd.

=== 2023 ===
- 8 February: China resumed imports of Australian coal.
- 18 May: China resumed imports of Australian timber.
- 4 August: China's Ministry of Commerce ruled that it was no longer necessary to impose tariffs on Australian barley.
- 12 December: China resumed imports from three Australian meat processors.

=== 2024 ===
- 28 March: China's Ministry of Commerce ruled that it was no longer necessary to impose tariffs on Australian wine.
- 29 May: China resumed imports from almost all Australian meat processors that were previously banned.
- 20 December: China resumed imports of Australian lobsters.

== Effects ==
=== Australia ===
==== Agricultural ====
Before the trade war, China was Australia's largest agricultural export market, representing 28% of all exports. China imported 70% of all cotton exports, 50% of all lobster, timber, and barley exports, 40% of all wine exports, and 5% of all beef exports from Australia. Agriculture is one Australia's most trade-dependent economic sectors.

The tariffs had a number of impacts on Australian agriculture. Although Australia found alternative markets for barley, such as Saudi Arabia and Mexico, one analyst estimated Australian farmers were losing $30–40 per tonne of barley, with Australian barley substantially cheaper than barley from France or Argentina.

Other Australian trading partners, including Singapore, South Korea, and the United Kingdom, increased their imports of Australian wine, but the wine export market lost one-third of its value since the start of the trade war, a loss which continued for years.

Lobsters that were previously exported and sold in China for $250 were now selling domestically for $100.

==== Energy ====
The ban on coal imports erased $1B from Australia's economy. However, due to surging fossil fuel prices and a weaker Australian dollar, Australia's overall resources sector earned more revenue in 2021 than in any previous year.

=== China ===
Chinese importers were required to find alternative suppliers.

== Reactions ==
=== Australia ===
On 18 May 2020, Australian Minister for Trade and Tourism Simon Birmingham reacted to the Chinese tariffs on Australian barley and said that "We reject the basis of this decision and will be assessing the details of the findings while we consider the next steps. We reserve the right to appeal this matter further."

In 2021, Australia's Department of Foreign Affairs and Trade requested the World Trade Organization to establish panels examining China’s anti-dumping and countervailing duties on Australian barley and wine. Australia subsequently notified each panel that the disputes had been resolved after China exempted tariffs on imports of Australian barley in August 2023 and Australian wine in March 2024.

=== China ===
During the early stages of the dispute in 2020, China's ambassador to Australia, Cheng Jingye, warned that Chinese consumers could boycott Australian goods and services if Australia continued its push for an international inquiry into COVID-19. Chinese officials and state representatives also criticised Australia's call for an inquiry, with the Chinese embassy accusing Australia of engaging in "political games" and urging it to "put aside ideological bias" and repair the bilateral relationship.

Chinese government messaging warned that continued policy positions perceived as unfriendly could damage economic and diplomatic relations. State affiliated commentary and official statements emphasised that tensions were the result of Australia's policy decisions, particularly its advocacy for a COVID-19 origins investigation and broader alignment with Western strategic positions.

== See also ==
- List of the largest trading partners of Australia
- List of the largest trading partners of China
- Canada–China trade war
- China–United States trade war
