= List of the largest trading partners of the Netherlands =

This is a list of the largest trading partners of the Netherlands based on data from The Observatory of Economic Complexity (OEC).

Export in Billion US-Dollar
Rank	Country	Export (2016)
1.	Germany	80
2.	Belgium; Luxembourg	59
3.	United Kingdom	44
4.	France	26
5.	Italy	22
6.	United States	16
7.	Spain	13
8.	Sweden	11
9.	China	10
10.	India	10
11.	Poland	7
12.	Denmark	7
13.	Austria	7
14.	Switzerland	5
15.	Hungary	4
16.	Czech Republic	4

Import in Billion US-Dollar
Rank	Country	Import (2016)
1.	Germany	72
2.	Belgium; Luxembourg	44
3.	China	39
4.	United States	33
5.	Russia	23
6.	United Kingdom	23
7.	France	17
8.	Italy	10
9.	Poland	8
10.	Japan	8
11.	Brazil	8
12.	Spain	8
13.	Sweden	7
14.	Norway	7
15.	Malaysia	7

== Countries and regions which the Netherlands is the largest trading partner of ==
The Netherlands is a dominant trading partner of several countries. The following tables are based on 2015 data as shown on the CIA World Factbook unless otherwise indicated. Some countries are repeated from the previous table.

Exports
Region	Percentage
São Tomé and Príncipe	29.2%
Iceland	26.1%
Russia	11.9%

Imports
Region	Percentage
Equatorial Guinea	16.9%
Belgium	16.7%
Germany	13.7%

== See also ==
- Economy of the Netherlands
- List of the largest trading partners of the United States
- List of the largest trading partners of the ASEAN
- List of the largest trading partners of China
- List of the largest trading partners of Russia
- List of the largest trading partners of Germany
- List of the largest trading partners of the European Union
