= TIFA =

TIFA may refer to:

- Toronto International Festival of Authors
- Trade and Investment Framework Agreement
