= List of the largest trading partners of Italy =

This is a list of the largest trading partners of Italy based on data from the Ministry of Foreign Affairs of Italy.

2023 Imports and Exports of goods by top 10 trading partners (billions of EUR)
Rank	Country / Territory	Total trade	Italy exports	Italy imports	Trade balance
-	European Union	660.3	323.0	337.3	-14.3
1	Germany	164.4	74.7	89.7	-15.0
2	France	110.0	63.4	46.6	16.8
3	United States	92.5	67.3	25.2	42.1
4	China	66.8	19.2	47.6	-28.4
5	Spain	65.8	33.0	32.8	0.2
6	Netherlands	54.9	18.5	36.4	-17.9
7	Switzerland	48.4	30.5	17.9	12.6
8	Belgium	46.0	19.3	26.7	-7.4
9	Poland	35.9	19.8	16.1	3.7
10	United Kingdom	34.8	26.1	8.7	17.4
—	Total	1,218.0	626.2	591.8	34.4

== See also ==
- Economy of Italy
- List of the largest trading partners of the European Union
- List of the largest trading partners of the United States
- List of the largest trading partners of Germany
- List of the largest trading partners of China
- List of the largest trading partners of Russia
- List of the largest trading partners of United Kingdom
