= List of imports of the United States =

The following is a list and analysis of imports into the United States for 2020 and 2019 in millions of United States dollars. The United States imported $2,810.6 billion worth of goods and services in 2020, down $2,945 billion from 2019. This consisted of $2,350.6 billion worth of goods and $460.1 billion worth of services. The goods and services deficit was $678.7 billion in 2020, up $101.9 billion from $576.9 billion in 2019. The 2020 increase in the goods and services deficit reflected an increase in the goods deficit of $51.5 billion, or 6.0%, to $915.8 billion and a decrease in the services surplus of $50.4 billion, or 17.5%, to $237.1 billion. As a percentage of U.S. gross domestic product, the goods and services deficit was 3.2% in 2020, up from 2.7% in 2019. The large decline in imports in 2020 has been attributed to the effects of COVID-19 pandemic. Some key highlights of the 2020 data are:

- Imports of goods decreased $166.2 billion to $2,350.6 billion in 2020.
  - Automotive vehicles, parts, and engines decreased $65.2 billion.
    - Passenger cars decreased $33.4 billion.
    - Automotive parts and accessories decreased $15.3 billion.
    - Trucks, buses, and special purpose vehicles decreased $10.8 billion.
  - Industrial supplies and materials decreased $42.3 billion.
    - Crude oil decreased $50.2 billion.
    - Other petroleum products decreased $16.5 billion.
    - Non-Monetary gold increased $25.1 billion.
    - Finished metal shapes increased $23.7 billion.
  - Capital goods decreased $31.2 billion.
    - Civilian aircraft engines decreased $11.1 billion.
    - Other industrial machinery decreased $6.7 billion.
    - Civilian aircraft parts decreased $6.7 billion.
    - Computers increased $11.5 billion.
- Imports of services decreased $128.3 billion to $460.1 billion in 2020.
  - Travel decreased $95.3 billion.
  - Transport decreased $35.9 billion.

U.S. Imports of Goods by End-Use Category and Commodity
In millions of dollars. Details may not equal totals due to seasonal adjustment and rounding. List does not include data of import of services.
#	Item	2020	2019	Change
	Total, Balance of Payments Basis	2,350,564	2,516,767	-166,203
	Net Adjustments	13,986	19,236	-5,250
	Total, Census Basis	2,336,579	2,497,531	-160,953
1	Foods, feeds, and beverages	154,394	150,510	3,884
	Other foods	20,979	19,190	1,790
	Vegetables	15,752	14,109	1,643
	Meat products	12,541	11,952	589
	Feedstuff and foodgrains	7,017	6,515	502
	Cane and beet sugar	2,011	1,585	426
	Bakery products	12,945	12,634	312
	Food oils, oilseeds	6,291	5,986	304
	Fruits, frozen juices	20,355	20,200	154
	Cocoa beans	996	905	91
	Tea, spices, etc.	2,566	2,542	23
	Nonagricultural foods, etc.	1,135	1,147	-13
	Dairy products and eggs	2,195	2,264	-68
	Wine, beer, and related products	12,039	12,192	-153
	Green coffee	4,425	4,619	-193
	Nuts	2,864	3,225	-362
	Fish and shellfish	21,477	22,028	-551
	Alcoholic beverages, excluding wine	8,808	9,418	-610
2	Industrial supplies and materials	479,230	521,514	-42,284
	Crude oil	76,338	126,562	-50,224
	Petroleum products, other	22,062	38,575	-16,512
	Fuel oil	16,096	25,904	-9,807
	Iron and steel mill products	12,146	16,325	-4,179
	Bauxite and aluminum	11,026	14,711	-3,685
	Gas-natural	4,940	6,868	-1,928
	Steelmaking materials	6,159	7,924	-1,765
	Plastic materials	15,798	17,541	-1,743
	Iron and steel products, n.e.c.	7,341	9,071	-1,730
	Chemicals-inorganic	7,581	9,035	-1,454
	Iron and steel, advanced	10,372	11,716	-1,344
	Chemicals-fertilizers	10,201	11,492	-1,291
	Nonferrous metals, other	3,215	4,465	-1,250
	Industrial supplies, other	36,120	37,369	-1,249
	Paper and paper products	7,149	8,111	-962
	Chemicals-organic	26,198	27,126	-928
	Liquefied petroleum gases	1,924	2,758	-834
	Synthetic rubber—primary	2,193	2,990	-797
	Synthetic cloth	4,909	5,580	-671
	Pulpwood and woodpulp	2,965	3,433	-468
	Nuclear fuel materials	2,509	2,947	-437
	Nickel	1,809	2,195	-386
	Natural rubber	1,197	1,524	-327
	Newsprint	511	745	-234
	Sulfur, nonmetallic minerals	1,108	1,336	-227
	Zinc	1,958	2,151	-193
	Materials, excluding chemicals	1,397	1,581	-184
	Hair, waste materials	891	1,053	-162
	Copper	4,774	4,928	-154
	Stone, sand, cement, etc.	6,198	6,352	-154
	Leather and furs	461	589	-128
	Tin	594	721	-126
	Glass-plate, sheet, etc.	1,848	1,949	-101
	Wool, silk, etc.	556	648	-92
	Farming materials, livestock	1,700	1,769	-69
	Coal and related fuels	1,859	1,922	-62
	Blank tapes, audio & visual	270	324	-53
	Hides and skins	47	45	1
	Cotton, natural fibers	90	84	6
	Electric energy	1,919	1,895	24
	Cotton cloth, fabrics	1,043	1,002	42
	Tobacco, waxes, etc.	8,735	8,597	138
	Finished textile supplies	5,394	5,237	157
	Plywood and veneers	3,238	3,061	177
	Nontextile floor tiles	6,238	5,923	315
	Shingles, wallboard	12,332	11,409	923
	Lumber	8,188	5,951	2,237
	Chemicals-other, n.e.c.	16,637	13,834	2,803
	Other precious metals	20,214	12,203	8,011
	Finished metal shapes	45,661	21,923	23,737
	Nonmonetary gold	35,119	10,062	25,057
3	Capital goods, except automotive	646,519	677,758	-31,240
	Engines-civilian aircraft	17,531	28,591	-11,060
	Industrial machines, other	55,981	62,707	-6,726
	Parts-civilian aircraft	13,214	19,927	-6,713
	Excavating machinery	11,337	15,419	-4,082
	Telecommunications equipment	58,849	62,475	-3,626
	Drilling & oilfield equipment	2,336	5,382	-3,045
	Industrial engines	24,189	27,131	-2,942
	Measuring, testing, control instruments	19,922	22,844	-2,922
	Materials handling equipment	17,079	19,825	-2,747
	Electric apparatus	53,301	55,799	-2,498
	Metalworking machine tools	10,822	12,884	-2,062
	Photo, service industry machinery	21,865	22,899	-1,034
	Wood, glass, plastic	8,329	8,939	-610
	Civilian aircraft	13,737	14,287	-550
	Railway transportation equipment	1,155	1,702	-546
	Laboratory testing instruments	7,446	7,786	-340
	Business machines and equipment	4,691	5,020	-329
	Pulp and paper machinery	6,097	6,359	-262
	Nonfarm tractors and parts	694	951	-257
	Specialized mining	831	949	-118
	Spacecraft, excluding military	87	193	-105
	Commercial vessels, other	107	180	-73
	Marine engines, parts	1,146	1,170	-25
	Vessels, except scrap	1	1	(-)
	Textile, sewing machines	2,237	2,196	41
	Food, tobacco machinery	4,383	4,336	47
	Agricultural machinery, equipment	11,382	11,290	92
	Generators, accessories	26,021	25,682	339
	Medical equipment	47,146	45,593	1,553
	Computer accessories	56,748	53,108	3,640
	Semiconductors	58,531	54,324	4,207
	Computers	89,322	77,809	11,513
4	Automotive vehicles, parts, and engines	310,684	375,934	-65,250
	Passenger cars, new and used	141,692	175,119	-33,427
	Other parts and accessories of vehicles	95,915	111,167	-15,253
	Trucks, buses, and special purpose vehicles	35,684	46,507	-10,823
	Engines and engine parts	24,884	29,107	-4,223
	Automotive tires and tubes	11,925	13,210	-1,286
	Bodies and chassis for trucks and buses	562	803	-242
	Bodies and chassis for passenger cars	23	21	3
5	Consumer goods	639,310	653,629	-14,319
	Cell phones and other household goods, n.e.c.	98,503	108,022	-9,519
	Apparel, household goods - cotton	34,943	44,452	-9,509
	Gem diamonds	12,075	19,814	-7,738
	Artwork, antiques, stamps, etc.	7,529	14,340	-6,811
	Footwear	14,515	19,604	-5,089
	Camping apparel and gear	11,354	13,650	-2,295
	Jewelry	11,873	13,946	-2,073
	Televisions and video equipment	21,735	23,666	-1,931
	Apparel, household goods - wool	1,732	2,815	-1,083
	Gem stones, other	2,345	3,422	-1,077
	Books, printed matter	3,412	4,161	-749
	Other consumer nondurables	15,316	16,006	-689
	Glassware, chinaware	2,182	2,600	-418
	Pleasure boats and motors	3,521	3,867	-345
	Musical instruments	1,745	1,961	-216
	Nursery stock, etc.	2,226	2,233	-6
	Recorded media	799	805	-6
	Rugs	2,959	2,910	49
	Motorcycles and parts	3,420	3,245	175
	Toiletries and cosmetics	12,636	12,458	179
	Furniture, household goods, etc.	37,916	37,611	305
	Photo equipment	4,688	4,360	328
	Cookware, cutlery, tools	12,085	11,252	833
	Apparel, household goods-nontextile	10,496	9,323	1,173
	Numismatic coins	2,385	1,073	1,312
	Stereo equipment, etc	8,512	5,974	2,538
	Household appliances	33,122	29,858	3,264
	Toys, games, and sporting goods	40,632	37,331	3,301
	Apparel, textiles, nonwool or cotton	61,822	53,779	8,043
	Pharmaceutical preparations	162,828	149,091	13,737
6	Other goods	106,442	118,186	-11,744

== 2015 list ==
#	Product	Value (billions of USD)
1	Electronic equipment	$332.9
	Phone system devices	$102.4
	Integrated circuits/microassemblies	$28.8
	TV receivers/monitors/projectors	$26.9
	Insulated wire/cable	$19.9
	Electrical converters/power units	$14.5
	Solar power diodes/semi-conductors	$11.6
	TV receiver/transmit/digital cameras	$10.6
	Lower-voltage switches, fuses	$10.2
	Electrical/optical circuit boards, panels	$10.1
	Electric motors, generators	$9.2
2	Machines, engines, pumps	$329.3
	Computers, optical readers	$81.4
	Turbo-jets	$22.2
	Printing machinery	$18.3
	Computer parts, accessories	$17.7
	Taps, valves, similar appliances	$15.2
	Piston engines	$11.3
	Liquid pumps and elevators	$10.7
	Air or vacuum pumps	$10.4
	Piston engine parts	$10.2
	Transmission shafts, gears, clutches	$8.8
3	Vehicles	$283.8
	Cars	$169.1
	Automobile parts/accessories	$66.5
	Trucks	$23.5
	Tractors	$12.1
	Trailers	$3.3
	Motorcycles	$2.2
	Bicycles, other non-motorized cycles	$1.7
	Motorcycle parts/accessories	$1.5
	Automobile bodies	$.984
	Public-transport vehicles	$.859
4	Fuel	$201.2
	Crude oil	$132.6
	Processed petroleum oils	$51.4
	Petroleum gases	$11.1
	Electrical energy	$2.4
	Petroleum oil residues	$1
	Coal, solid fuels made from coal	$.872
	Coal tar oils (high temperature distillation)	$.535
	Petroleum jelly, mineral waxes	$.496
	Peat	$.332
	Natural bitumen, asphalt, shale	$.238
5	Pharmaceuticals	$86.1
6	Medical, technical equipment	$78.3
7	Furniture, lighting, signs	$61.2
8	Gems, precious metals	$60.2
9	Organic chemicals	$52.1
10	Plastics	$50.2
	Total	$2.309 trillion

== See also ==
- List of exports of the United States
- List of the largest trading partners of the United States
- Value added tax trade criticism
- US Import Data
