= Trade and Investment Framework Agreement =

International trade pact

- Type: Trade agreement
- Members: Afghanistan; Algeria; Angola; Argentina; Armenia; ASEAN; Bahrain; Brunei; Cambodia; Caricom; COMESA; East African Community; ECOWAS; Egypt; GCC; Georgia; Ghana; Iceland; Indonesia; Iraq; Kazakhstan; Kuwait; Kyrgyzstan; Lebanon; Liberia; Libya; Malaysia; Maldives; Mauritius; Mongolia; Mozambique; Nepal; New Zealand; Nigeria; Oman; Pakistan; Philippines; Qatar; Rwanda; Saudi Arabia; South Africa; Sri Lanka; Switzerland; Taiwan; Tajikistan; Thailand; Tunisia; Turkey; Turkmenistan; Ukraine; United Arab Emirates; United States; Uruguay; Uzbekistan; Vietnam; Yemen

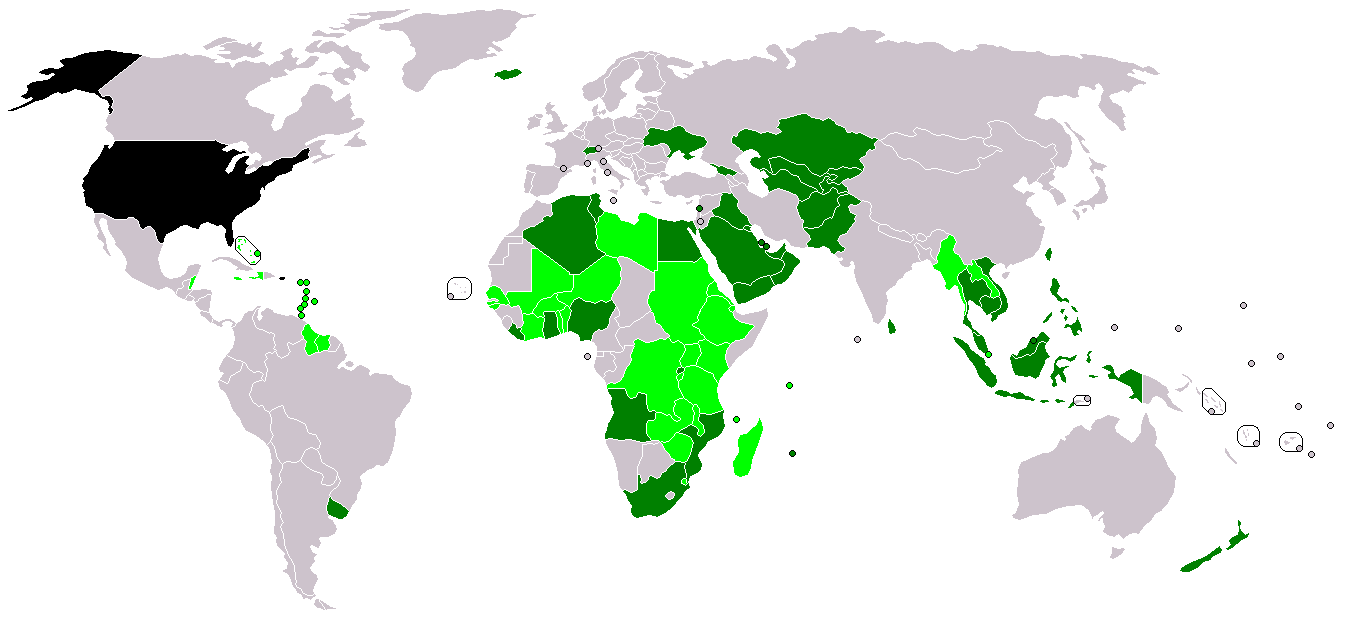
United States TIFAs United States Bilateral US-partner agreement US-trade bloc agreement (COMESA, EAC, CARICOM, ASEAN)

A Trade and Investment Framework Agreement (TIFA) is a trade pact that establishes a framework for expanding trade and resolving outstanding disputes between countries.

TIFAs are often seen as an important step towards establishing Free Trade Agreements.

== The GATT ==
The General Agreement on Tariffs and Trade (GATT) is a legal agreement between many countries, whose overall purpose was to promote international trade by reducing or eliminating trade barriers such as tariffs or quotas. According to its preamble, its purpose was the "substantial reduction of tariffs and other trade barriers and the elimination of preferences, on a reciprocal and mutually advantageous basis."

The GATT was first discussed during the United Nations Conference on Trade and Employment and was the outcome of the failure of negotiating governments to create the International Trade Organization (ITO). It was signed by 23 nations in Geneva on 30 October 1947, and took effect on 1 January 1948. It remained in effect until the signature by 123 nations in Marrakesh on 14 April 1994, of the Uruguay Round Agreements which established the World Trade Organization (WTO) on 1 January 1995. The WTO is a successor to the GATT, and the original GATT text (GATT 1947) is still in effect under the WTO framework, subject to the modifications of GATT 1994. Nations that were not party in 1995 to the GATT need to meet the minimum conditions spelled out in specific documents before they can accede; in September 2019, the list contained 36 nations.

The GATT, and its successor the WTO, have successfully reduced tariffs. The average tariff levels for the major GATT participants were about 22% in 1947, but were 5% after the Uruguay Round in 1999. Experts attribute part of these tariff changes to GATT and the WTO.

== NAFTA ==
The North American Free Trade Agreement (NAFTA; Spanish: Tratado de Libre Comercio de América del Norte, TLCAN; French: Accord de libre-échange nord-américain, ALÉNA) is an agreement signed by Canada, Mexico, and the United States, creating a trilateral trade bloc in North America. The agreement came into force on January 1, 1994, and superseded the 1988 Canada–United States Free Trade Agreement between the United States and Canada. The NAFTA trade bloc is one of the largest trade blocs in the world by gross domestic product.

== ASEAN ==
The United States and ASEAN concluded the U.S.-ASEAN Trade and Investment Arrangement (TIFA) in 2006 and since then have been working to build U.S.-ASEAN trade and investment ties as well as promote ASEAN regional economic integration. The United States intensified its work under the TIFA in 2009, presenting ASEAN senior officials a number of ambitious proposals to be pursued under the TIFA work plan. These proposed initiatives seek to achieve concrete results in a variety of areas including trade facilitation, logistics, digital economy, trade finance, and trade and environment. The 10-member countries of ASEAN together comprise the fourth largest export market of the United States and its fifth largest two-way trading partner. ASEAN countries include Brunei, Burma, Cambodia, Indonesia, Laos, Malaysia, Philippines, Singapore, Thailand, and Vietnam. Trade between the U.S. and ASEAN continues to grow steadily, and two-way goods trade totaled $177 billion in 2008. With robust economies and a total population of about 550 million, the 10-member countries of the ASEAN market provide significant potential opportunities for U.S. companies.

== Taiwan ==
The U.S. goods trade deficit with Taiwan was $15.2 billion in 2006, an increase of $2.4 billion from $12.8 billion in 2005. U.S. goods exports in 2006 were $23.0 billion, up 4.3 percent from the previous year. Corresponding U.S. imports from Taiwan were $38.2 billion, up 9.7 percent. Taiwan is as of June 2015, the 11th largest export market for U.S. goods. U.S. exports of private commercial services (excluding military and government) to Taiwan were $6.4 billion in 2005 (latest data available), and U.S. imports were $6.4 billion. Sales of services in Taiwan by majority U.S.-owned affiliates were $10.2 billion in 2004 (latest data available), while sales of services in the United States by majority Taiwan-owned firms were $475 million. The stock of U.S. foreign direct investment (FDI) in Taiwan was $13.4 billion in 2005. U.S. FDI in Taiwan is concentrated largely in the finance, manufacturing and wholesale trade sectors. The United States and Taiwan continued to work together to enhance economic cooperation through bilateral Trade and Investment Framework Agreement (TIFA) process. The TIFA, which was established in 1994, is an important mechanism for both parties to resolve bilateral trade issues and to address the concerns of the U.S. business community. The United States and Taiwan held a productive meeting of the fifth meeting of the TIFA Joint Council in Taipei, May 25–26, 2006, covering issues related to agricultural trade, intellectual property rights, pharmaceuticals, government procurement and investment, as well as other areas.

== Uruguay ==
The U.S.-Uruguay commercial relationship has developed significantly in the past several years. In 2002, Uruguay and the United States created a Joint Commission on Trade and Investment (JCTI) to exchange ideas on a variety of economic topics. The Commission served as an important mechanism for the two countries to work to enhance and broaden their trade relationship, and facilitated the successful negotiation of the United States - Uruguay Bilateral Investment Treaty (BIT), which entered into force on November 1, 2006. The United States and Uruguay signed the United States - Uruguay TIFA on January 25, 2007. The TIFA established the United States - Uruguay Trade and Investment Council (TIC) and serves as a mechanism to further deepen the trade and investment dialogue. On October 2, 2008, both governments signed protocols to the TIFA covering substantive commitments in the areas of trade facilitation and public participation in trade and environment. The TIFA contains an annex that established a work program calling for the two governments to address such matters as liberalization of bilateral trade and investment, intellectual property rights, regulatory issues, information and communications technology and electronic commerce, trade facilitation, trade and technical capacity building, trade in services, government procurement, and cooperation on sanitary and phytosanitary measures. The annex provides for the TIC to add other matters to the work program. In implementing the TIFA, both parties reconfirmed their commitment to expand economic opportunities between Uruguay and the United States while simultaneously coordinating their efforts to promote greater trade liberalization through the World Trade Organization (WTO).

== See also ==
- Bilateral Investment Treaty (BIT)
