= List of largest trading partners of India =

According to the Ministry of Commerce and Industry, the twenty-five largest trading partners of India represent 77.6% of total trade by India in the financial year 2025–26. These figures include trade in goods and commodities, but do not include services or foreign direct investment.The two largest goods traded by India are mineral fuels (refined / unrefined) and gold (finished gold ware / gold metal). In the year 2013–14, mineral fuels (HS code 27) were the largest traded item with 181.383 billion US$ worth imports and 64.685 billion US$ worth re-exports after refining. In the year 2024–2025, gold and its finished items (HS code 71) were the second-largest traded items with 55.846 billion US$ worth imports and 41.692 billion US$ worth re-exports after value addition, and a significant amount of this Gold is being imported from Japan as Gold Chemical Compounds to save duty and import tax free under India-Japan Economic Partnership which is not only hurting import tax revenue but widening trade deficit. These two goods are constituting 53% total imports, 34% total exports and nearly 100% of total trade deficit (136 billion US$) of India in the financial year 2013–14. The services trade (exports and imports) are not part of commodities trade. The trade surplus in services trade is US$70 billion in the year 2017–18.Counting the European Union (EU) as one, the World Trade Organisation (WTO) ranks India fifth for commercial services exports and sixth for commercial services imports.The two primary destinations of India's exports are the EU and the United States, whereas the China and the EU are the two primary countries from which India's imports come from. These figures include trade in goods and commodities, but do not include services or foreign direct investment

== Trade statistics ==
Overall foreign trade data in billion US$
Financial year	Merchandise				Services				Overall trade balance			
Financial year	Exports	Imports	Total trade	Trade balance	Exports	Imports	Total trade	Trade balance	Exports	Imports	Total trade	Trade Balance
2025–26	441.78	774.98	1,216.76	−333.19	421.30	204.42	625.72	+216.88	863.08	979.40	1,842.48	−116.31
2024–25	437.42	720.24	1,157.66	–282.83	387.54	198.72	586.26	+188.82	824.96	918.96	1,743.92	−94.00
2023–24	437.07	678.22	1,115.29	–241.14	341.11	178.32	519.43	+162.78	778.18	856.54	1,643.72	−78.36

== Largest trading partners with India ==
In the financial year 2025–2026, India exported about US$441.78 billion in merchandise and about US$421.3 billion in services.

Trade with India's 25 largest trading partners in the financial year 2025–26. This accounted for 77.6% of India's total merchandise trade.
Rank	Country	Exports	Imports	Total trade	Trade balance
1	China	19.47	131.63	151.10	-112.16
2	United States	87.32	53.49	140.80	33.83
3	United Arab Emirates	37.36	63.89	101.25	-26.54
4	Russia	4.49	55.37	59.86	-50.88
5	Saudi Arabia	10.28	30.79	41.07	-20.51
6	Singapore	11.86	24.24	36.10	-12.38
7	Hong Kong	8.08	24.33	32.41	-16.25
8	Germany	11.53	19.51	31.03	-7.98
9	Iraq	2.96	24.56	27.52	-21.60
10	Japan	6.04	21.44	27.48	-15.40
11	South Korea	6.01	21.35	27.37	-15.34
12	Switzerland	1.21	24.28	25.49	-23.06
13	United Kingdom	13.44	11.68	25.13	1.76
14	Indonesia	4.49	20.29	24.78	-15.80
15	Netherlands	17.50	5.79	23.29	11.71
16	Thailand	5.06	16.43	21.49	-11.37
17	Australia	7.28	13.81	21.10	-6.53
18	Malaysia	6.83	14.18	21.00	-7.35
19	Vietnam	6.67	11.62	18.28	-4.95
20	France	7.10	8.71	15.82	-1.61
21	South Africa	7.01	8.56	15.57	-1.55
22	Brazil	7.02	8.05	15.07	-1.03
23	Italy	7.79	6.67	14.46	1.12
24	Qatar	1.62	12.29	13.91	-10.67
25	Belgium	6.60	6.41	13.01	0.19
-	Remaining Countries	136.75	135.60	272.36	1.16
Total		441.78	774.98	1216.76	-333.19

== Countries to which India is the largest trading partner ==
India is the primary export or import partner of several countries. The percentages on these tables are based on 2017 data as shown on the CIA World Factbook.

Exports from these countries to India
Country	Percentage
Bhutan	95.3%
Guinea-Bissau	67.1%
Afghanistan	56.5%
Nepal	53.1%
Nigeria	30.6%
Mozambique	28.1%
Ghana	23.8%
Tanzania	21.8%
Iraq	21.2%
United Arab Emirates	10.1%

Imports by these countries from India
Country	Percentage
Bhutan	89.5%
Nepal	70.2%
Sri Lanka	22.0%
Burundi	18.5%
Mauritius	17.9%
Tanzania	16.5%

== Export partners ==
India exports approximately 7500 commodities to about 192 countries. The following table shows India's 10 largest destinations for exports in 2025–26)

Rank	Country	Value (US$ billion)	Share of overall exports
1	United States	87.32	19.78%
2	United Arab Emirates	37.36	8.46%
3	China	19.47	4.41%
4	Netherlands	17.5	3.96%
5	United Kingdom	13.44	3.05%
6	Singapore	11.86	2.69%
7	Germany	11.53	2.61%
8	Bangladesh	10.59	2.40%
9	Saudi Arabia	10.28	2.33%
10	HK	8.08	1.83%

== Import partners ==
India imports around 6000 commodities from 140 countries. The following table shows India's 10 largest sources of imports in 2025–26.

Rank	Country	Value (US$ billion)	Share of overall imports
1	China	131.62	16.97%
2	United Arab Emirates	63.89	8.24%
3	Russia	55.36	7.14%
4	United States	53.45	6.89%
5	Saudi Arabia	30.79	3.97%
6	Iraq	24.56	3.17%
7	HK	24.32	3.14%
8	Switzerland	24.27	3.13%
9	Singapore	24.24	3.12%
10	JP	21.44	2.76%

== See also ==
India related

- Foreign trade of India
- Economy of India
- Foreign-exchange reserves of India
- Free trade agreements of India
- Remittances to India
- Business process outsourcing to India
- List of exports of India
- Indian diaspora
- Indianisation

Lists

- List of countries by leading trade partners
- List of the largest trading partners of the ASEAN
- List of the largest trading partners of the United States
- List of the largest trading partners of the European Union
- List of the largest trading partners of China
- List of the largest trading partners of Australia
- List of the largest trading partners of Canada
- List of the largest trading partners of South Korea
