= List of U.S. states and territories by exports and imports =

This is a list of U.S. states, U.S. territories, and the District of Columbia by exports of goods and imports of goods as of 2024. (Note: American Samoa, Guam, and Northern Mariana Islands data is from 2017.)

An export in international trade is a good or service produced in one country that is bought by someone in another country. The sum of the exports of the states is significantly lower than the value of the United States' total exports. The difference results from goods originating from states of origin, returned goods and goods with unidentified states of origin.

An import in international trade is a good or service produced in one country that is bought (imported) by someone in another country. The sum of the imports of the states is lower than the value of the United States' total imports. The difference results from goods originating from states of origin, returned goods and goods with unidentified states of origin.

Texas has the highest export rank, while the Northern Mariana Islands has the lowest export rank. California has the highest import rank, while American Samoa has the lowest import rank.

== Exports ==
U.S. states and territories by exports 2024 (in current dollars)
National rank	State/territory	Exports in US$ million	% of states GDP	Largest market	Largest export product
—	United States	2,064,517	8.0	Canada	transportation equipment
1	Texas	455,031	16.8	Mexico	oil and gas
2	California	182,343	4.5	Mexico	computer equipment
3	New York	91,244	4.0	Canada	miscellaneous manufactured commodities
4	Louisiana	86,951	26.5	China	oil and gas
5	Illinois	80,817	7.1	Canada	pharmaceuticals and medicines
6	Florida	72,168	4.2	Brazil	aerospace products and parts
7	Michigan	61,563	8.7	Canada	motor vehicles
8	Washington	57,776	6.8	China	aerospace products and parts
9	Ohio	56,579	6.1	Canada	aerospace products and parts
10	Indiana	59,868	11.4	Canada	pharmaceuticals and medicines
11	Pennsylvania	53,187	5.1	Canada	pharmaceuticals and medicines
12	Georgia	53,133	6.0	Canada	aerospace products and parts
13	Kentucky	47,774	16.3	Canada	aerospace products and parts
14	New Jersey	42,932	5.1	Canada	primary metal manufacturing
15	North Carolina	42,824	5.1	Canada	pharmaceuticals and medicines
16	South Carolina	38,027	10.9	Germany	motor vehicles
17	Tennessee	38,948	7.1	Canada	medical equipment and supplies
18	Massachusetts	34,864	4.5	China	pharmaceuticals and medicines
19	Oregon	34,062	10.3	Mexico	semiconductors and other electronic components
20	Arizona	32,223	5.8	Mexico	aerospace products and parts
21	Wisconsin	27,514	6.1	Canada	machinery, except electrical
22	Alabama	26,835	8.4	Canada	motor vehicles
23	Minnesota	26,561	5.3	Canada	computer equipment
24	Puerto Rico	24,700	17.6	Netherlands	pharmaceuticals and medicines
25	Virginia	21,780	2.8	Canada	petroleum and coal products
26	Missouri	19,390	4.3	Canada	motor vehicles
27	Utah	18,213	7.9	United Kingdom	primary metal manufacturing
28	Connecticut	17,382	4.8	Canada	aerospace products and parts
29	Maryland	17,855	3.3	Canada	aerospace products and parts
30	Kansas	14,366	6.1	Mexico	aerospace products and parts
31	Mississippi	13,690	8.7	Canada	petroleum and coal products
32	New Mexico	12,002	8.5	Mexico	computer equipment
33	Colorado	10,504	1.9	Mexico	animals slaughtering and processing
34	Nevada	10,361	4.0	Canada	primary metal manufacturing
35	Nebraska	8,161	4.4	Mexico	animals slaughtering and processing
36	Oklahoma	7,746	2.9	Canada	aerospace products and parts
37	New Hampshire	7,123	5.9	Germany	aerospace products and parts
38	Arkansas	6,894	3.7	Mexico	aerospace products and parts
39	Alaska	5,932	8.5	China	fish and other marine products
40	North Dakota	5,532	7.3	Canada	petroleum and coal products
41	West Virginia	4,857	4.5	Canada	resin, synthetic rubber and artificial synthetic products
42	Iowa	4,249	3.3	Canada	semiconductors and other electronic components
43	Delaware	4,706	4.6	Canada	pharmaceuticals and medicines
44	Idaho	4,249	3.3	Canada	semiconductors and other electronic components
45	Rhode Island	3,074	3.7	Canada	waste and scrap
46	Maine	3,062	3.1	Canada	pulp and paper
47	District of Columbia	2,718	1.5	Switzerland	aerospace products and parts
48	Montana	2,371	3.1	Canada	basic chemicals
49	South Dakota	2,113	2.8	Canada	animals slaughtering and processing
50	Wyoming	2,068	3.9	Canada	chemicals
51	Vermont	1,865	4.1	Canada	semiconductors and other electronic components
52	U.S. Virgin Islands	625	18.8	Martinique	petroleum and coal products
53	Hawaii	461	0.4	Japan	aerospace products and parts
54	American Samoa	33	5.23	Australia	Animal meal and pellets
55	Guam	19	0.32	Palau	Industrial printers
56	Northern Mariana Islands	4	0.22	South Korea	Hydrogen
—	Unallocated	87,546	...	Canada	special classification provisions, NESOI

== Imports ==
U.S. states and territories by imports 2024 (in current dollars)
National rank	State/territory	Imports in million US$	% of states GDP	Largest source	Largest import product
—	United States	3,267,389	12.2	Mexico	computer equipment
1	California	491,478	12.0	China	computer equipment
2	Texas	397,175	16.8	Mexico	computer equipment
3	Illinois	218,142	19.2	Canada	oil and gas
4	Michigan	173,161	24.5	Mexico	motor vehicles
5	New York	159,748	7.0	Canada	miscellaneous manufactured commodities
6	New Jersey	152,968	18.1	China	motor vehicles
7	Georgia	145,589	16.5	Mexico	motor vehicles
8	Pennsylvania	127,325	12.4	China	pharmaceuticals and medicines
9	Tennessee	120,335	21.9	China	pharmaceuticals and medicines
10	Florida	117,118	6.9	China	motor vehicles
11	Indiana	106,748	20.2	Ireland	pharmaceuticals and medicines
12	Kentucky	94,524	32.3	Mexico	pharmaceuticals and medicines
13	North Carolina	87,611	10.4	Ireland	pharmaceuticals and medicines
14	Ohio	86,910	9.4	Canada	pharmaceuticals and medicines
15	Washington	62,097	7.3	Canada	oil and gas
16	South Carolina	58,064	16.6	China	motor verhicle parts
17	Massachusetts	43,252	5.5	Canada	petroleum and coal products
18	Maryland	42,688	7.3	Germany	motor vehicles
19	Arizona	42,243	7.7	Mexico	semiconductors and other electronic components
20	Minnesota	40,635	8.1	Canada	oil and gas
21	Virginia	40,756	5.3	China	aerospace products and parts
22	Wisconsin	38,859	8.6	China	pharmaceuticals and medicines
23	Alabama	38,757	12.1	Mexico	motor vehicle parts
24	Louisiana	31,463	9.6	Mexico	oil and gas
25	Oregon	28,232	8.5	China	aerospace products and parts
26	Puerto Rico	25,200	26.9	Ireland	chemicals
27	Missouri	24,312	5.4	China	motor vehicles parts
28	Connecticut	22,783	6.2	Canada	primary metal manufacturing
29	Utah	21,919	7.3	Mexico	primary metal manufacturing
30	Mississippi	21,400	13.6	China	oil and gas
31	Colorado	16,788	3.0	Canada	oil and gas
32	Nevada	18,823	7.2	China	semiconductors and other electronic components
33	Oklahoma	17,960	6.8	Canada	oil and gas
34	Kansas	14,485	6.2	Canada	machinery, except electrical
35	Iowa	12,464	4.8	Canada	machinery, except electrical
36	Rhode Island	11,144	13.5	Germany	motor vehicles
37	Delaware	10,621	10.3	Canada	oil and gas
38	New Hampshire	10,206	8.4	Canada	aerospace products and parts
39	New Mexico	9,141	6.5	Mexico	semiconductors and other electronic components
40	Idaho	8,936	7.0	Malaysia	semiconductors and other electronic components
41	Montana	7,372	9.7	Canada	oil and gas
42	Arkansas	7,186	3.8	Canada	aerospace products and parts
43	Maine	6,734	6.8	Canada	petroleum and coal products
44	Nebraska	6,018	3.2	Canada	basic chemicals
45	West Virginia	4,835	4.5	Canada	aerospace products and parts
46	North Dakota	4,275	5.7	Canada	machinery, except electrical
47	Alaska	3,631	5.2	South Korea	petroleum and coal products
48	Vermont	3,526	7.7	Canada	sugar and confectionary products
49	Hawaii	2,171	1.9	South Korea	petroleum and coal products
50	District of Columbia	1,713	0.9	Australia	primary metal manufacturing
51	South Dakota	1,689	2.2	Canada	animals slaughtering and processing
52	Wyoming	1,315	2.5	Canada	grain and oilseed milling products
53	U.S. Virgin Islands	$1,464	38.9	India	petroleum and coal products
54	Guam	$1,110	18.94	Malaysia	Computers
55	Northern Mariana Islands	$140	8.8	Hong Kong	Trunks and cases
56	American Samoa	$123	19.4	Singapore	Refined petroleum
—	Unallocated	24,552	...	China	special classification provisions, nesoi

== See also ==
- List of countries by imports
- List of countries by exports
- Foreign trade of the United States
- State import statistics by the International Trade Administration
- STATS America state-level rankings
