= Ocean freight differential =

The Ocean Freight Differential (under United States P.L. 480) refers to the difference between the cost of P.L. 480 shipments that are required to be carried on U.S. flag vessels compared to the cost that would have been incurred had they been carried on lower cost foreign bottoms or vessels. The U.S. government pays this difference either by paying the total freight, if the sale is made under Title II of P.L. 480, or by reimbursing the recipient country or private grain company (whichever pays the shipping) if the sale is made under Title I of P.L. 480.
