= List of the largest trading partners of China =

This is a list of the largest trading partners of the People's Republic of China.

== Background ==
China has become the world's second largest economy by GDP (Nominal) and largest by GDP (PPP).

'China developed a network of economic relations with both industrial economies and those constituting the semi-periphery and periphery of the world system.' Due to the rapid growth of China's economy, the nation has developed many trading partners throughout the world. All trading partners are considered important to the development of the Chinese economy, however the title of China's largest partners are ever-changing due to national and international policy changes.

The expansion of the Chinese economy grew 6.8% the last quarter of 2017, equaling the growth of the prior 3 months exceeding expectations of 6.7%. The overall economy expanded 6.9% last year, just beating the 6.7% of 2016 which ended a drought of a declining trend that started in 2011.

== List of largest trading partners of China ==
The major trading partners for mainland China 2025 were as follows:

2025 Imports and Exports of goods by top 23 trading partners (billions of USD)
Rank	Country / Territory	Total trade	China exports	China imports	Trade balance
-	ASEAN	1,054.6	665.2	389.4	275.8
-	European Union	828.1	559.9	268.2	291.8
1	United States	559.7	420.1	139.7	280.4
2	Hong Kong	367.4	335.6	31.7	303.9
3	South Korea	331.2	144.2	187.0	-42.8
4	Japan	322.2	157.3	164.8	-7.5
5	Taiwan	314.3	83.6	230.7	-227.6
6	Vietnam	296.1	198.1	98.0	100.2
7	Russia	228.1	103.3	124.8	-21.5
8	Germany	211.1	118.3	92.8	25.4
9	Australia	206.5	76.3	130.3	-53.9
10	Malaysia	191.7	103.7	88.0	15.7
11	Brazil	188.0	71.6	116.4	-44.8
12	Indonesia	167.5	85.3	82.2	3.2
13	India	155.6	135.9	19.7	116.1
14	Thailand	153.3	103.5	49.8	53.8
15	Singapore	119.3	82.7	36.6	46.1
16	Netherlands	114.3	93.8	20.5	73.4
17	United Kingdom	103.7	85.1	18.6	66.4
18	Canada	89.6	47.9	41.7	6.2
19	France	84.0	47.8	36.2	11.6
20	Italy	76.2	51.2	24.9	26.3
—	Total	6,354.8	3,771.9	2,582.9	1,189.0

China is the largest trading partner of many countries. The following tables are based on 2023 data as shown on the CIA World Factbook.

Exports
Nation	Percentage
Mongolia	92%
New Caledonia	75%
North Korea	74%
DR Congo	69%
Eritrea	67%
Sierra Leone	67%
Turkmenistan	63%
Solomon Islands	56%
South Sudan	51%
Congo	46%
Timor-Leste	46%
Oman	43%
Angola	40%
Laos	39%
Chile	39%
Cuba	38%
Australia	37%
Guinea	36%
Iran	35%
Belarus	34%
Peru	34%
Taiwan	33%
Russia	33%
Iraq	33%
Myanmar	32%
Philippines	31%
Brazil	30%
New Zealand	28%
Papua New Guinea	28%
Equatorial Guinea	27%
Malaysia	26%
Gabon	26%
South Korea	25%
Mauritania	25%
Kuwait	25%
Panama	25%
Vietnam	24%
Indonesia	24%
Greenland	23%
Singapore	23%
Japan	22%
Saudi Arabia	21%
Uruguay	21%
Ecuador	21%
Zimbabwe	20%
Chad	19%
South Africa	19%
Niger	18%
Qatar	18%
Sudan	17%
Brunei	17%
Kazakhstan	16%
Micronesia	16%
Zambia	15%
Central African Republic	14%
Israel	14%
Thailand	13%
Mozambique	13%
Namibia	12%
Switzerland	12%
Bolivia	11%
United Arab Emirates	11%
Ethiopia	10%
Rwanda	10%
Venezuela	10%

Imports
Nation	Percentage
North Korea	97%
Mongolia	57%
Tajikistan	57%
Vietnam	54%
Russia	53%
Liberia	48%
Marshall Islands	47%
Kyrgyzstan	44%
Cameroon	43%
Tuvalu	42%
Solomon Islands	42%
Myanmar	40%
Cambodia	39%
Guinea	39%
Venezuela	35%
DR Congo	35%
Bangladesh	34%
Iran	34%
Belarus	33%
Paraguay	33%
Djibouti	32%
Eritrea	32%
Sierra Leone	32%
Uzbekistan	32%
Tanzania	32%
South Korea	31%
Ghana	30%
Indonesia	29%
Chad	28%
Australia	26%
Ethiopia	26%
Peru	26%
Thailand	26%
Nigeria	26%
Niger	26%
Pakistan	25%
Philippines	25%
Palau	25%
Congo	24%
Malaysia	24%
Algeria	24%
Papua New Guinea	24%
Brazil	23%
Yemen	23%
Chile	23%
Japan	22%
Kenya	22%
Taiwan	21%
Saudi Arabia	21%
Benin	21%
South Africa	21%
Sudan	21%
Argentina	20%
New Zealand	20%
India	19%
Madagascar	19%
Mauritania	19%
Angola	19%
United Arab Emirates	19%
Rwanda	19%
Uganda	19%
Rwanda	19%
Senegal	19%
Gambia	18%
Jordan	17%
Israel	17%
Samoa	17%
Ivory Coast	16%
Egypt	16%
United States	15%
Singapore	15%
Mauritius	15%
Burundi	15%
Turkey	13%
United Kingdom	13%
Gabon	13%
Bahrain	13%
Panama	13%
Germany	12%
Lebanon	11%
Greece	10%

== See also ==
- Economy of China
- Internationalization of the renminbi
- List of countries by leading trade partners

=== International ===
List of the largest trading partners of: Australia • ASEAN • Bangladesh • Canada • European Union: (Germany • Italy • Netherlands) • India • Russia • United Kingdom • South Korea • United States
