= List of the largest trading partners of Germany =

This is a list of the largest trading partners of Germany, ranked by the value of merchandise exports and imports, based on data from the Federal Statistical Office of Germany (Destatis).

In 2025, China was Germany's largest trading partner by total merchandise trade (exports plus imports), with bilateral trade valued at €251.8 billion, followed by the United States (€240.5 billion) and the Netherlands (€209.1 billion). China previously held the top position from 2016 to 2023, before being overtaken by the United States in 2024. The United States remained Germany's largest export destination in 2025, while China was its largest source of imports.

Exports by country (2025, billion euros)
Rank	Country	Exports
1	United States	146.20
2	France	117.42
3	Netherlands	112.47
4	Poland	99.90
5	Italy	83.54
6	China	81.25
7	Austria	79.97
8	United Kingdom	79.87
9	Switzerland	73.85
10	Spain	59.12
11	Belgium	58.63
12	Czech Republic	53.50
13	Hungary	30.57
14	Turkey	29.37
15	Sweden	28.83
16	Denmark	24.01
17	Romania	22.83
18	Japan	21.02
19	South Korea	17.86
20	Slovakia	17.76

Imports by country (2025, billion euros)
Rank	Country	Imports
1	China	170.59
2	Netherlands	96.66
3	United States	94.32
4	Poland	80.53
5	Italy	72.47
6	France	68.99
7	Czech Republic	62.24
8	Switzerland	55.51
9	Austria	54.11
10	Belgium	47.30
11	Spain	39.11
12	United Kingdom	38.57
13	Hungary	34.98
14	Norway	26.55
15	Turkey	25.51
16	Ireland	22.17
17	Japan	22.07
18	Slovakia	20.64
19	Romania	19.77
20	Sweden	19.01

== See also ==
- Economy of Germany
- List of the largest trading partners of the European Union
- List of the largest trading partners of the United States
- List of the largest trading partners of the ASEAN
- List of the largest trading partners of China
- List of the largest trading partners of Russia
- List of the largest trading partners of United Kingdom
- List of the largest trading partners of Italy
