= List of the largest trading partners of the United States =

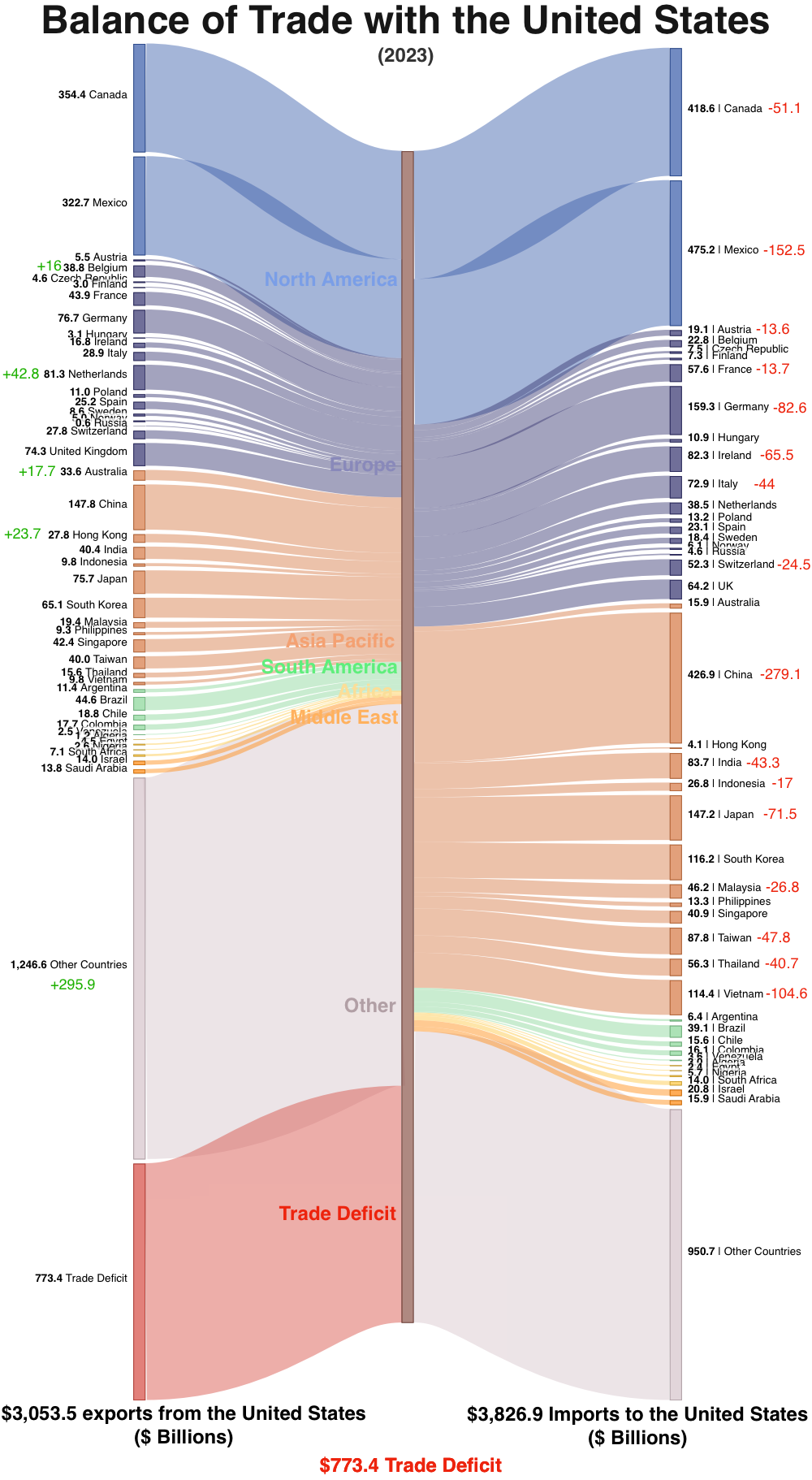
The international balance of trade with the United States, 2023

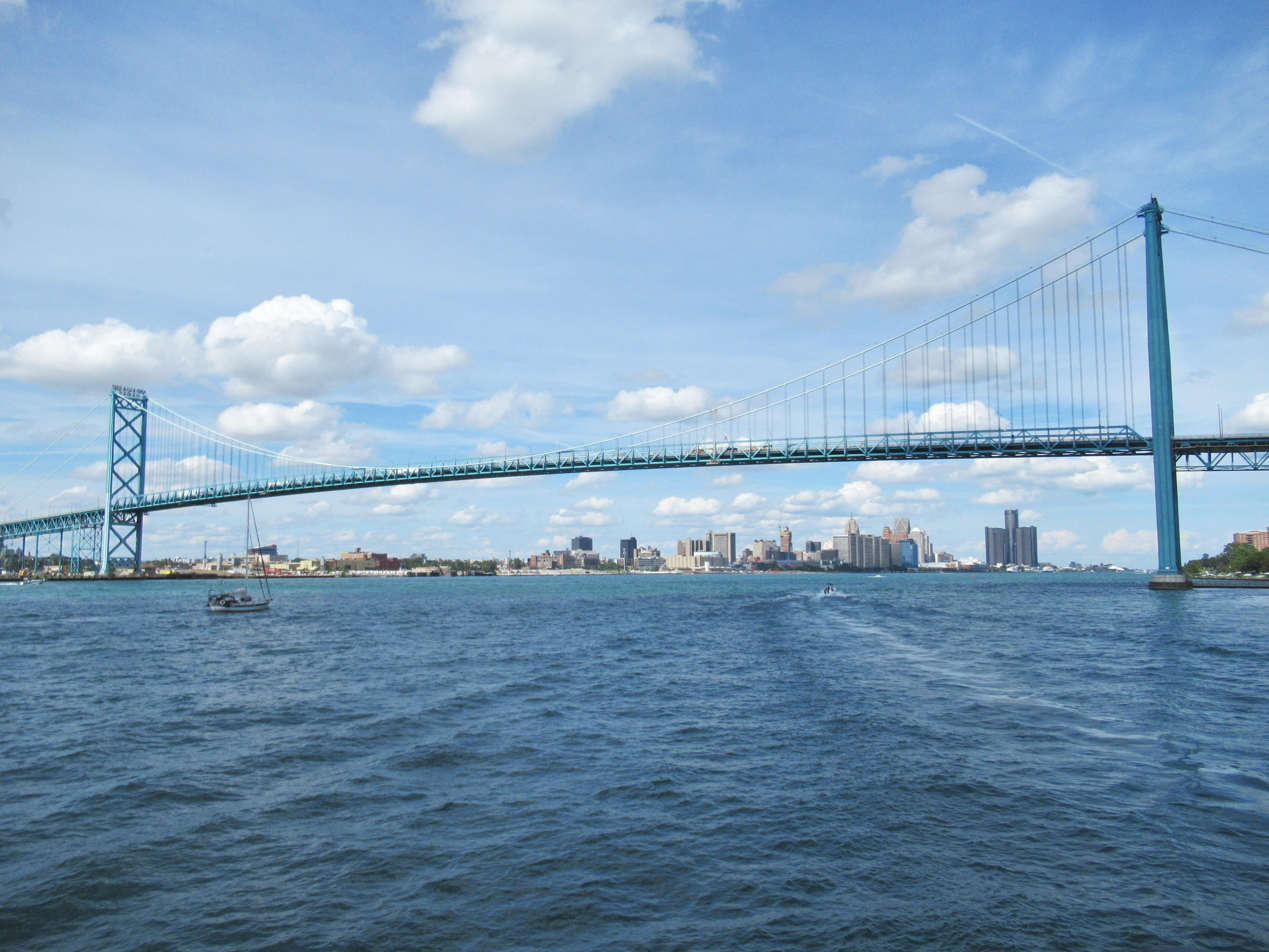
The Ambassador Bridge between Detroit, Michigan, and Windsor, Ontario, is the busiest international border crossing in North America by trade volume.

The 30 largest trade partners of the US by totaled services and Merchandise trade in 2025.

In 2025, Mexico was the largest trading partner of the United States, followed by Canada and China.

== Largest US trading partners ==
The largest US trade partners, with their total trade in goods and services (the sum of imports and exports) in billions of US dollars, are as follows:

Rank	Country/region	Exports	Imports	Total trade	Trade balance	Calendar year
–	European Union	709.1	839.3	1,548.5	−130.2	2025
–	ASEAN	187.4	488.8	676.2	−301.4	2026
1	Mexico	390.7	585.4	976.1	−194.6	2026
2	Canada	426.4	450.8	877.2	−24.4	2026
3	China	199.3	461.4	660.7	−262.2	2025
4	United Kingdom	206.1	167.7	373.8	+38.4	2026
5	Germany	129.2	208.3	337.5	−79.1	2026
6	Japan	136.8	191.4	328.2	−54.6	2026
7	Ireland	119.9	166.1	286.0	−46.2	2026
8	Taiwan	69.9	214.9	284.8	−145.0	2026
9	Switzerland	140.4	142.2	282.6	−1.75	2026
10	India	89.2	152.3	241.5	−63.1	2026
11	South Korea	97.9	143.4	241.2	−45.5	2026
12	Vietnam	19.1	196.1	215.3	−177.0	2026
13	Netherlands	134.4	53.3	187.7	+81.1	2026
14	France	79.6	102.0	181.6	−22.4	2026
15	Italy	56.7	93.4	150.1	−36.6	2026
16	Singapore	90.0	56.7	146.7	+33.3	2026
17	Brazil	87.3	46.8	134.1	+40.5	2026
18	Australia	61.2	42.7	103.9	+18.5	2026
19	Thailand	21.4	67.0	88.4	−45.6	2025
20	Malaysia	32.5	62.3	94.8	−29.8	2026
21	Belgium	43.1	33.8	76.9	+9.23	2026
22	Spain	38.6	35.8	74.4	+2.75	2026
23	Hong Kong	51.7	21.4	73.1	+30.3	2026
24	Bermuda	9.88	61.7	71.6	−51.9	2026
25	Colombia	30.3	26.0	56.3	+4.35	2026
26	Israel	23.9	30.7	54.6	−6.78	2026
27	Chile	27.8	23.7	51.4	+4.09	2026
28	Indonesia	14.2	36.7	51.0	−22.5	2026
29	Turkey	21.5	21.7	43.2	−0.232	2025
30	Philippines	12.9	27.3	41.7	−12.9	2026
–	World	3,400	4,300	7,700	−901.5	2026

== Balance of trade by category ==
U.S. Goods Trade Balance by Country and Industry (2014) The numbers represent the U.S. trade balance in goods (in billions of USD) with each listed region or country by industry sector for 2014. Negative values indicate a trade deficit, and positive values indicate a trade surplus.
Category	China	Euro Area	Japan	Mexico	Pacific	Canada	Middle East	Latin America	Totals by category
Computer	−151.9	3.4	−8.0	−11.0	−26.1	20.9	5.8	12.1	−155.0
Oil, Gas, Minerals	1.9	6.4	2.4	−20.8	1.1	−79.8	−45.1	−15.9	−149.7
Transportation	10.9	−30.9	−46.2	−59.5	−0.5	−6.1	17.1	8.8	−106.3
Apparel	−56.3	−4.9	0.6	−4.2	−6.3	2.5	−0.3	−1.1	−69.9
Electrical Equipment	−35.9	−2.4	−4.0	−8.5	−3.3	10.0	1.8	2.0	−40.4
Misc. Manufacturing	−35.3	4.9	2.7	−2.8	−1.4	5.8	−1.5	1.8	−25.8
Furniture	−18.3	−1.2	0.0	−1.6	−2.1	0.4	0.2	0.0	−22.6
Machinery	−19.9	−27.0	−18.8	3.9	7.6	18.1	4.5	9.1	−22.4
Primary Metals	−3.1	3.1	−1.8	1.0	1.9	−8.9	−0.9	−10.4	−19.1
Fabricated Metals	−17.9	−5.9	−3.5	2.8	−4.3	7.3	1.2	1.9	−18.5
Plastics	−15.7	−1.9	−2.0	5.7	−4.1	2.6	−0.1	0.5	−15.0
Textile	−12.3	−1.1	−0.3	2.8	−4.6	1.5	−0.9	0.2	−14.7
Beverages, Tobacco	1.3	−9.9	0.6	−3.3	0.0	1.0	0.2	−0.6	−10.6
Nonmetallic Minerals	−6.1	−1.9	−0.4	−1.2	0.1	1.9	−0.5	−0.8	−8.9
Paper	−2.7	1.2	1.1	4.3	1.2	−9.8	0.9	−1.9	−5.8
Chemical	−3.9	−39.5	−1.5	19.1	3.2	4.6	−2.4	15.8	−4.7
Food	0.7	−3.6	6.1	4.9	0.9	0.1	1.4	−1.1	9.5
Agriculture	17.8	6.2	7.3	−3.0	5.7	−0.8	2.8	−6.5	29.5
Petroleum	0.6	−1.2	0.1	16.6	−2.0	−0.1	0.6	18.3	32.9
Total by Country/Area	−346.1	−106.1	−65.6	54.9	−33.0	−29.0	−15.1	32.3	

== Countries of which United States is the largest trading partner ==
The United States is also the primary export or import partner of several countries. The percentages on these tables are based on 2022 data as shown on the CIA World Factbook.

Exports
Region	Percentage
Mexico	77%
Haiti	84%
Canada	75%
Bahamas	49%
Nicaragua	52%
Saint Kitts and Nevis	61%
Saint Lucia	17%
El Salvador	38%
Dominican Republic	50%
Costa Rica	40%
Jamaica	57%
Barbados	23%
Trinidad and Tobago	35%
Honduras	51%
Guatemala	32%
Colombia	26%
Ecuador	27%
Israel	25%
Grenada	33%
Sri Lanka	24%
Ireland	30%
Jordan	20%
Belize	22%
Fiji	39%
Cambodia	36%
Japan	19%
Vietnam	29%
Madagascar	18%
China	15%
Pakistan	17%
Philippines	14%
India	18%
United Kingdom	13%
Bangladesh	18%
Thailand	17%
Germany	10%
Kenya	10%
San Marino	10%
Switzerland	15%
Tonga	35%
Kosovo	16%

Imports
Region	Percentage
Bahamas	59%
Saint Kitts and Nevis	47%
Canada	56%
Mexico	56%
Antigua and Barbuda	57%
Saint Vincent and the Grenadines	40%
Dominican Republic	44%
Saint Lucia	76%
Barbados	43%
Jamaica	36%
Guatemala	34%
El Salvador	30%
Belize	33%
Costa Rica	39%
Trinidad and Tobago	40%
Honduras	47%
Grenada	37%
Guyana	28%
Colombia	26%
Dominica	51%
Ecuador	26%
Suriname	25%
Nicaragua	26%
Haiti	31%
China	7%

== See also ==
- Economy of the United States
- List of imports of the United States
- Value added tax trade criticism

International:

- List of the largest trading partners of Australia
- List of the largest trading partners of the ASEAN
- List of the largest trading partners of Canada
- List of the largest trading partners of China
- List of the largest trading partners of the European Union
  - List of the largest trading partners of Germany
  - List of the largest trading partners of Italy
  - List of the largest trading partners of the Netherlands
- List of the largest trading partners of India
- List of the largest trading partners of Russia
- List of the largest trading partners of United Kingdom
- List of the largest trading partners of South Korea
