= List of largest trading partners of ASEAN =

These figures do not include trade intra ASEAN, services or foreign direct investment, but only trade in goods. The tenth largest ASEAN trading partners with their total trade (sum of imports and exports) in billions of US Dollars for calendar year 2021. In the table, a positive trade balance means that the ASEAN exports more than it imports from the given country.

== 2022 ==
ASEAN trade in goods (2022 in billion dollars)
| Rank | Country/District | Exports | Imports | Total Trade | Trade Balance |
|---|---|---|---|---|---|
| - | World | 1,512.3 | 1,477.4 | 2,989.7 | 34.9 |
| 1 | China | 290.8 | 431.3 | 722.1 | −140.5 |
| 2 | United States | 291.0 | 129.5 | 420.5 | 161.4 |
| 3 | European Union | 176.4 | 118.8 | 295.2 | 57.6 |
| 4 | Japan | 133.3 | 135.3 | 268.6 | −2.0 |
| 5 | South Korea | 80.9 | 141.9 | 222.8 | −61.0 |
| 6 | Taiwan | 58.8 | 129.1 | 187.9 | −70.3 |
| 7 | Hong Kong | 114.7 | 46.2 | 160.8 | 68.6 |
| 8 | India | 70.6 | 42.5 | 113.1 | 28.1 |
| 9 | Australia | 52.0 | 49.1 | 101.1 | 2.9 |
| 10 | United Kingdom | 19.4 | 14.9 | 34.3 | 4.5 |

== 2021 ==
ASEAN trade in goods (2021 in billion dollars)
| Rank | Country/District | Exports | Imports | Total Trade | Trade Balance |
|---|---|---|---|---|---|
| - | World | 1,342.2 | 1,287.2 | 2,629.4 | 55.0 |
| 1 | China | 280.8 | 388.4 | 669.2 | −107.6 |
| 2 | United States | 255.2 | 109.3 | 364.5 | 145.9 |
| 3 | European Union | 152.3 | 116.5 | 268.8 | 35.7 |
| 4 | Japan | 113.9 | 126.5 | 240.4 | −12.6 |
| 5 | South Korea | 68.7 | 120.9 | 189.6 | −52.3 |
| 6 | Taiwan | 51.8 | 112.4 | 164.2 | −60.6 |
| 7 | Hong Kong | 116.9 | 43.5 | 160.4 | 73.4 |
| 8 | India | 87.5 | 44 | 131.5 | 43 |
| 9 | Australia | 43.0 | 39.1 | 82.1 | 3.9 |
| 10 | United Kingdom | 18.1 | 13.5 | 31.6 | 4.6 |

== See also ==
- Economy of ASEAN
- List of the largest trading partners of China
- List of the largest trading partners of the United States
- List of the largest trading partners of the European Union
- List of the largest trading partners of Japan
- List of the largest trading partners of Germany
- List of the largest trading partners of South Korea
