= List of the largest trading partners of the United Kingdom =

This is a list of the largest trading partners of the United Kingdom as of October 2024.

Trade in GBP £ Millions
Rank	Country	Imports to UK	Exports from UK	Total trade	Trade balance
-	Total for non-EU	425,401	504,968	930,369	79,567
-	European Union (Total)	450,889	356,266	807,155	-94,623
1	United States	115,356	186,735	302,091	71,379
2	Germany	87,621	62,982	150,603	-24,639
3	Netherlands	64,322	52,541	116,863	-11,781
4	France	60,230	44,647	104,877	-15,583
5	China	59,376	33,300	92,676	-26,076
6	Ireland	30,261	57,732	87,993	27,471
7	Spain	41,173	19,723	60,896	-21,450
8	Belgium	31,713	25,681	57,394	-6,032
9	Italy	31,569	18,866	50,435	-12,703
10	Switzerland	18,863	30,232	49,095	11,369
11	India	23,740	16,141	39,881	-7,599
12	Norway	30,205	9,252	39,457	-20,953
13	Poland	19,566	10,487	30,053	-9,079
14	Japan	13,860	14,181	28,041	321
15	Hong Kong	9,660	16,923	26,583	7,263
16	Turkey	15,619	9,822	25,441	-5,797
17	Sweden	14,084	11,240	25,324	-2,844
18	Canada	9,267	15,782	25,049	6,515
19	Singapore	7,372	14,818	22,190	7,446
20	Australia	5,944	14,897	20,841	8,953
21	Luxembourg	5,884	11,663	17,547	5,779
22	Saudi Arabia	4,387	12,785	17,172	8,398
23	Denmark	8,603	8,284	16,887	-319
24	South Korea	6,998	9,884	16,882	2,886
25	Greece	7,333	3,822	11,155	-3,511
26	Brazil	4,902	6,185	11,087	1,283
27	Portugal	7,622	3,349	10,971	-4,273
28	South Africa	5,722	4,495	10,217	-1,227
29	Austria	6,277	3,437	9,714	-2,840
30	Czech Republic	6,075	3,633	9,708	-2,442
31	Romania	6,815	2,518	9,333	-4,297
32	Taiwan	3,943	4,388	8,331	445
33	Hungary	4,717	3,379	8,096	-1,338
34	Finland	3,135	3,125	6,260	-10
35	Thailand	3,620	2,577	6,197	-1,043
36	Israel	2,691	3,246	5,937	555
37	Mexico	2,661	3,172	5,833	511
38	Malaysia	2,378	3,321	5,699	943
39	Egypt	1,824	2,670	4,494	846
40	Pakistan	2,334	1,963	4,297	-371
41	Slovak Republic	2,642	1,336	3,978	-1,306
42	Morocco	2,255	1,464	3,719	-791
43	Cyprus	1,545	1,915	3,460	370
44	New Zealand	1,220	2,134	3,354	914
45	Indonesia	1,569	1,746	3,315	177
46	Lithuania	1,958	1,206	3,164	-752
47	Malta	1,245	1,519	2,764	274
48	Russia	542	1,685	2,227	1,143
49	Iceland	1,130	680	1,810	-450
50	Chile	608	1,114	1,722	506
