= List of the largest trading partners of Russia =

This is a list of the largest trading partners of Russia in 2024, based on data from The Observatory of Economic Complexity (OEC) in billions of US dollars, are as follows:

Rank	Country	Exports	Imports	Trade
1.	China	130	114	244
2.	India	66.4	4.84	71.24
3.	Turkey	25.9	8.5	34.4
4.	Kazakhstan	18.2	9.55	27.75
5.	Brazil	12.2	1.45	13.65
6.	Armenia	9.24	3.14	12.38
7.	South Korea	6.87	4.52	11.39
8.	Uzbekistan	7.71	2.98	10.69
9.	Germany	2.17	8.13	10.30
10.	Italy	3.65	4.59	8.24
11.	Hong Kong	6.43	1.5	7.93
12.	Japan	5.65	1.91	7.56
13.	France	4.45	2.21	6.66
14.	Egypt	6.01	0.607	6.617
15.	Hungary	5.53	1.04	6.57
16.	Singapore	4.37	1.18	5.55
17.	Taiwan	4.56	0.596	5.156
18.	Slovakia	4.72	0.236	4.956
19.	Poland	1.89	2.96	4.85
20.	Azerbaijan	3.62	1.18	4.80
	World total	377	202	579

== See also ==
- Economy of Russia
- List of the largest trading partners of the United States
- List of the largest trading partners of the European Union
- List of the largest trading partners of the ASEAN
