= List of the largest trading partners of the European Union =

EU Top 5 Top 10

The European Union (EU) maintains extensive trade relationships with countries around the world, reflecting its role as one of the largest global economic blocs. According to data published by the European Commission's Directorate-General for Trade, the EU's top trading partners are ranked based on the total value of goods traded—combining both imports and exports—measured in billions of euros.

With the United Kingdom’s withdrawal from the EU, the United Kingdom entered the top 10 partners of the EU-27.

EU-27 trade in goods and services (2025, in billions of euros)
Rank	Country/district	Goods Exports	Goods Imports	Services Exports	Services Imports	Total trade	Trade balance
1	United States	554.612	356.231	343.4	521.8	1776.0	20.0
2	United Kingdom	345.349	158.730	308.5	248.6	1061.2	246.9
3	China	199.432	559.990	67.1	45.8	872.3	-339.3
4	Switzerland	219.424	143.167	171.7	101.8	636.1	146.2
-	ASEAN	95.1	179.8	-	-	274.9	-84.7
5	Turkey	114.174	103.328	-	-	217.5	10.8
6	Japan	65.750	63.328	44.6	24.2	197.9	22.8
7	India	48.883	69.477	29.3	37.9	185.6	-29.2
-	Gulf Cooperation Council	110.3	55.6	-	-	165.7	54.4
8	Norway	64.004	95.685	-	-	159.7	-31.7
9	Canada	48.812	33.006	29.4	19.7	130.9	25.5
10	South Korea	54.533	69.733	-	-	124.3	-15.2
-	Mercosur	55.0	54.5	-	-	109.5	0.5

== See also ==
- European Union free trade agreements
- List of the largest trading partners of the ASEAN
- List of the largest trading partners of India
- List of the largest trading partners of the United States
- List of the largest trading partners of the People's Republic of China
- List of the largest trading partners of South Korea
