= Yelken =

Yelken (Turkish for "sail") is a Turkish surname. Notable people with the name include:

== Surname ==
- Aydın Yelken (1939–2022), Turkish footballer
- Müslüm Yelken (born 1988), Turkish footballer

== Given name ==
- Yelken Octuri (born 1970), French industrial designer

== See also ==
- Yelken, Gürün, a village in the Turkish Sivas province
- Yacht Club Yelken, a yacht club in Awaza, Turkmenistan
