= LLDC =

LLDC may refer to:

- Landlocked developing countries
- London Legacy Development Corporation
- Lancashire Learning Disability Consortium
