= Logistics Performance Index =

Interactive benchmarking tool by the World Bank

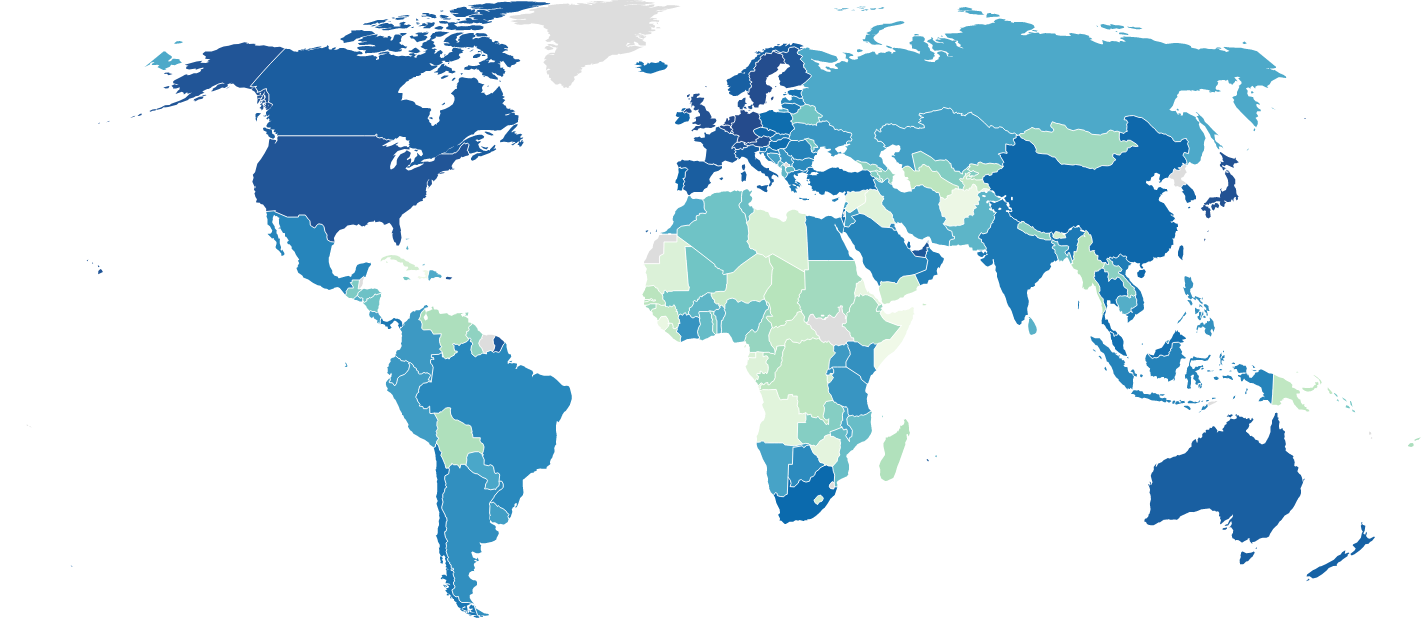
World map representing aggregated LPI 1.0 2012–2018 distribution: 1–24 25–48 49–72 73–96 / 97–120 121–144 145–167 Data unavailable

The Logistics Performance Index (LPI) is an analysis tool created by the World Bank.

The survey-based LPI 1.0 (pre 2026) was the combination of the weighted average of the country scores on six key dimensions: customs performance, infrastructure quality, ease of arranging shipments, logistics services quality, consignments tracking and tracing and timeliness of shipments as well as practical data measuring logistics efficiency. This measure indicated the relative ease and efficiency with which products could be moved into and inside a country. Singapore and Finland were the most efficient and highest ranked LPI countries as per the 2023 LPI.

After 2026 the LPI was upgraded to the 2.0 version, reflecting the major methodological shift done in that year's LPI.

The Logistics Performance Index was reported by the World Bank every two years from 2010 to 2018 with a break in 2020 due to the COVID-19 pandemic and a restructuring of the index methodology, eventually coming out only in 2023. The LPI is based on data from stakeholders in the countries where they operate and those with which they trade. Since 2023 the LPI incorporates certain key performance indicators and big data to complement the results of the survey. Since 2026 the LPI methodology has been fully redesigned.

LPI results have been used in numerous policy reports and documents prepared by multilateral organizations. The index findings provide a global benchmark for the logistics industry and its users.[1] LPI results have also gained recognition within the academic community.

LPI results have been used in many policy reports and documents prepared by multilateral organizations. The index findings provide a global benchmark for the logistics industry and its users. LPI results have also gained recognition within the academic community.

== Composition of LPI 2.0 ==
Until 2023 the LPI was based on a survey in which logistics professionals rated, on a 1 to 5 scale, the ease of establishing supply chains with economies they traded with. The 2.0 LPI is a complex of several objective measures pulled from actual tracking data, covering aviation, maritime and postal areas of logistics.

LPI 2.0 core components:

1. Number of aviation partner economies, partners
2. Aviation import dwell time, days
3. Number of maritime partner economies, partners
4. Container import dwell time, days
5. Number of business-to-business postal partner economies, days
6. Business-to-business postal delivery time, days

LPI 2.0 supplementary components:

1. Number of alliances, alliances
2. Number of services, services
3. Number of transshipments, transshipments
4. Container export dwell time, days
5. Export supply chain initiation, days
6. Import supply chain termination, days
7. Lead time to import from port of origin to destination economy, days
8. Time spent in transshipment, days
9. Turnaround time at ports, days
10. Corridor lead time from port exit to destination (LLDC), days
11. Dwell time at destination (LLDC), days
12. Dwell time at port of arrival for container destined for LLDC, days
13. Reference dwell time at port of arrival (LLDC), days
14. Number of business-to-consumer postal partner economies, partners
15. Business-to-consumer postal delivery time, days

== Historical composition of the survey-based LPI 1.0 ==
The logistics performance (LPI) 1.0 is the weighted average of the country scores on six key dimensions:

1. The efficiency of the clearance process (i.e; speed, simplicity and predictability of formalities) by border control agencies, including customs.
2. Quality of trade and transport-related infrastructure (e.g., ports, railroads, roads, information technology);
3. Ease of arranging competitively priced shipments;
4. Competence and quality of logistics services (e.g., transport operators, customs brokers);
5. Ability to track and trace consignments;
6. Timeliness of shipments in reaching the destination within the scheduled or expected delivery time.

=== LPI 2023 KPIs ===
In the 2023 edition, the following KPIs were added to the LPI report:

Container shipping - contains:

1.Number of services

2.Number of alliances

3.Number of partners (countries)

4.Turnaround time (days)

5.Turnaround time weighted by ships TEU

Aviation - contains:

1.Number of partners (countries)

2.Aviation import dwell time (days)

Postal - contains:

1.Average number of international postal partners

2.Delivery time

Import delays - contains:

1.Number of observations

2.Consolidated dwell time

3.Port dwell time

Export delays - contains:

1.Number of observations

2.Consolidated dwell time

3.Port dwell time

Landlocked developing countries - contains:

1.Port dwell time

2.Corridor

3.Inland and destination dwell time

4. Reference dwell times for transit countries

== Historical top 10 LPI countries ==
Full listing by country is available on The World Bank website. After 2026 there was a change in methodology that does not allow a ranking of countries per an overall score.

	2023		2018		2016		2014		2012		2010		2007	
Country	Rank	Score	Rank	Score	Rank	Score	Rank	Score	Rank	Score	Rank	Score	Rank	Score
Germany	3	4.1	1	4.20	1	4.23	1	4.12	4	4.03	1	4.11	3	4.10
Sweden	7	4	2	4.05	3	4.20	6	3.96	13	3.85	3	4.08	4	4.08
Belgium	7	4	3	4.04	6	4.11	3	4.04	7	3.98	9	3.94	12	3.89
Canada	7	4	20	3.73	14	3.93	12	3.86	14	3.85	14	3.87	10	3.92
Austria	7	4	4	4.03	7	4.10	22	3.65	11	3.89	19	3.76	5	4.06
Japan	13	3.9	5	4.03	12	3.97	10	3.91	8	3.93	7	3.97	6	4.02
Netherlands	3	4.1	6	4.02	4	4.19	2	4.05	5	4.02	4	4.07	2	4.18
Switzerland	3	4.1	13	3.9	11	3.99	14	3.84	16	3.8	6	3.97	7	4.02
Singapore	1	4.3	7	4.00	5	4.14	5	4.00	1	4.13	2	4.09	1	4.19
Denmark	3	4.1	8	3.99	17	3.82	17	3.78	6	4.02	16	3.85	13	3.86
United Kingdom	19	3.7	9	3.99	8	4.07	4	4.01	10	3.90	8	3.95	9	3.99
Finland	2	4.2	10	3.97	15	3.92	24	3.62	3	4.05	12	3.89	15	3.82

== 2023 Logistics Performance Index ==
In the 2023 LPI, several KPI's were added to the overall LPI, though not included or added to the final score which is still survey-based.

139 countries were considered and for the first time, several countries hold the same rank and position, such as Denmark, Germany, Switzerland and the Netherlands all holding the number 3 rank in the 2023 LPI. Singapore leads the ranking with a 4.3 score. Afghanistan is in last place with a score of 1.9.

== 2018 Logistics Performance Index ==
In the Logistics Performance Index 2018 Germany again leads the table as #1 with an LPI score of 4.20. Followed by Sweden, Belgium, Austria and Japan in that order of top 5 Nations. The LPI scores of high-income countries are 48% higher than in lower-income countries. Afghanistan holds the last position with a 1.73 score.

== 2016 Logistics Performance Index ==
In the 2016 LPI, the top position is held by Germany (LPI score of 4.23). Civil war-inflicted Syria holds the last position (LPI score of 1.60).

== Controversy ==
Several studies have noted that, due to the nature of the methodology of the LPI, where it was comprised solely out of subjective answers of different logistics operators, it tended to be skewed and undervalued some countries with a statistically better logistics system. Moreover, studies have shown that the LPI was much more influenced by social rather than economic factors. In 2023 the World Bank somewhat changed the LPI methodology to address these issues. As of 2026, the LPI 2.0 methodology has been fully changed to reflect a more objective view of national logistics systems.
