= List of countries by exports per capita =

This is a list of countries by exports per capita. The list includes sovereign states and self-governing dependent territories based upon the ISO standard ISO 3166-1. The following tables shows the per capita value of total, merchandise and service exports, expressed in United States dollars (current prices), according to United Nations Conference on Trade and Development (UNCTAD), World Trade Organization, and World Bank. International merchandise trade measures the value of goods which add or subtract from the stock of material resources of an economy by entering or leaving its territory. The value of exports is recorded as the free-on-board value (FOB).

In the following tables, two trade systems are shown: the General Trade System and the Special Trade System. The General Trade System is used when the statistical territory of a compiling country coincides with its economic territory. Consequently, exports include all goods leaving the economic territory of a compiling country. The Special Trade System is used when the statistical territory comprises only a particular part of the economic territory within which goods may be disposed without customs restriction (free circulation area). Exports include all goods leaving the free circulation area. However, goods entering and goods leaving an industrial free zone are not recorded since they have not been cleared through customs for home use. The products processed in free zones are also excluded from exports.

The services and its distinction from goods are explained as follows: "Services are the result of a production activity that changes the conditions of the consuming units, or facilitates the exchange of products or financial assets. Services are not generally separate items over which ownership rights can be established and cannot generally be separated from their production. However, […] some knowledge-capturing products, such as computer software and other intellectual property products, may be traded separately from their production, like goods. In the balance of payments goods and services account, the valuation of goods includes transport within the exporting economy as well as wholesale and retail services indistinguishably in the price of the goods. Furthermore, the value of some service items includes the values of some goods, in the cases of travel, construction, and government goods and services n.i.e. Some services, particularly manufacturing services, repairs, and freight transport, also relate to goods."

Totals of international trade presented in the following tables are not strictly comparable. Discrepancies arise due to the use of different complementary sources. The trade figures of groups of economies are the sums of the trade values of the component individual economies. Sorting is alphabetical by country code, according to ISO 3166-1 alpha-3.

== UN Trade and Development ==
Total exports per capita (USD current prices) – UN Trade and Development
Country/Territory/Region/Group	Population 2023	Merchandise exports	Merchandise exports per capita	Service exports	Service exports per capita	Total exports	Total exports per capita
Country/Territory/Region/Group	(thousands)	(millions USD)	(USD)	(millions USD)	(USD)	(millions USD)	(USD)
(United Nations) WORLD	8045311.45	23783588.96	2956.20	7913451.12	983.61	31697040.08	3939.82
Aruba	106.28	147.18	1384.87	3029.55	28506.17	3176.73	29891.04
Afghanistan	42239.85	903.00	21.38	984.83	23.32	1887.83	44.69
Angola	36684.20	38351.20	1045.44	75.85	2.07	38427.05	1047.51
Anguilla	15.90	14.99	942.83	209.43	13172.53	224.42	14115.35
Albania	2832.44	4324.44	1526.75	7193.25	2539.60	11517.69	4066.35
Andorra	80.09	252.37	3151.16				
United Arab Emirates	9516.87	487778.00	51254.03	166150.45	17458.52	653928.45	68712.55
Argentina	45773.88	66787.00	1459.06	16522.73	360.96	83309.73	1820.03
Armenia	2777.97	8415.20	3029.26	5619.43	2022.85	14034.63	5052.12
Antigua and Barbuda	94.30	26.74	283.57	1122.68	11905.66	1149.42	12189.23
Australia	26439.11	370865.86	14027.17	73723.56	2788.43	444589.42	16815.60
Austria	8958.96	223549.25	24952.59	89709.61	10013.40	313258.86	34965.98
Azerbaijan	10412.65	33898.60	3255.52	6285.24	603.62	40183.84	3859.14
Burundi	13238.56	204.19	15.42	108.06	8.16	312.25	23.59
Belgium	11686.14	562438.96	48128.72	146304.30	12519.47	708743.26	60648.19
Benin	13712.83	4070.53	296.84	612.27	44.65	4682.80	341.49
Caribbean Netherlands	27.15	1.20	44.20				
Burkina Faso	23251.49	4308.93	185.32	528.20	22.72	4837.13	208.04
Bangladesh	172954.32	55787.86	322.56	6378.27	36.88	62166.13	359.44
Bulgaria	6687.72	47854.31	7155.55	15254.44	2280.96	63108.75	9436.52
Bahrain	1485.51	25235.11	16987.52	15530.32	10454.54	40765.43	27442.06
Bahamas	412.62	707.61	1714.91	4354.54	10553.31	5062.15	12268.22
Bosnia and Herzegovina	3210.85	9232.38	2875.37	3282.07	1022.18	12514.45	3897.55
Belarus	9498.24	40168.20	4229.02	8503.85	895.31	48672.05	5124.32
Belize	410.83	488.07	1188.02	974.03	2370.91	1462.10	3558.94
Bermuda	64.07	27.43	428.13	1606.70	25077.65	1634.13	25505.78
Bolivia	12388.57	11018.35	889.40	1196.88	96.61	12215.23	986.01
Brazil	216422.45	339695.77	1569.60	45193.87	208.82	384889.64	1778.42
Barbados	282.00	486.08	1723.72	1398.32	4958.67	1884.40	6682.39
Brunei	452.52	9090.34	20088.08	340.01	751.36	9430.35	20839.45
Bhutan	787.42	794.85	1009.43	128.14	162.73	922.99	1172.16
Botswana	2675.35	5423.74	2027.30	641.01	239.60	6064.75	2266.90
Central African Republic	5742.32	136.72	23.81	226.20	39.39	362.92	63.20
Canada	38781.29	569257.11	14678.65	136712.00	3525.20	705969.11	18203.86
Switzerland	8796.67	420170.01	47764.67	168928.89	19203.73	589098.90	66968.41
Chile	19629.59	94937.00	4836.42	9699.82	494.14	104636.82	5330.57
China	1425671.35	3380024.50	2370.83	381120.58	267.33	3761145.08	2638.16
Ivory Coast	28873.03	20263.41	701.81	1035.97	35.88	21299.38	737.69
Cameroon	28647.29	4400.00	153.59	2422.57	84.57	6822.57	238.16
Democratic Republic of the Congo	102262.81	16400.00	160.37	50.25	0.49	16450.25	160.86
Republic of the Congo	6106.87	5970.00	977.59	618.39	101.26	6588.39	1078.85
Cook Islands	17.04	6.57	385.47				
Colombia	52085.17	49544.90	951.23	15155.71	290.98	64700.61	1242.21
Comoros	852.08	30.64	35.96	120.62	141.56	151.26	177.52
Cape Verde	598.68	54.47	90.98	713.65	1192.04	768.12	1283.02
Costa Rica	5212.17	19025.19	3650.15	15388.21	2952.36	34413.40	6602.51
Cuba	11194.45	1939.00	173.21	8773.61	783.75	10712.61	956.96
Curaçao	192.08	533.25	2776.23	1546.44	8051.15	2079.69	10827.38
Cayman Islands	69.31	36.55	527.34	4043.32	58336.75	4079.87	58864.09
Cyprus	915.96	4453.35	4861.94	24098.56	26309.56	28551.91	31171.50
Czech Republic	10495.30	255450.48	24339.52	39707.02	3783.32	295157.50	28122.84
Germany	83294.63	1688419.20	20270.44	438894.00	5269.18	2127313.20	25539.62
Djibouti	1136.46	5001.60	4401.05	1097.63	965.84	6099.23	5366.89
Dominica	73.04	15.29	209.34	161.88	2216.32	177.17	2425.66
Denmark	5910.91	136630.58	23114.97	114371.00	19349.13	251001.58	42464.10
Dominican Republic	11332.97	12935.30	1141.39	12910.80	1139.22	25846.10	2280.61
Algeria	45606.48	51798.74	1135.78	3830.39	83.99	55629.13	1219.76
Ecuador	18190.48	31126.42	1711.14	3156.36	173.52	34282.78	1884.65
Egypt	112716.60	39852.85	353.57	33648.62	298.52	73501.47	652.09
Eritrea	3748.90	495.20	132.09	549.28	146.52	1044.48	278.61
Spain	47519.63	423220.67	8906.23	197975.00	4166.17	621195.67	13072.40
Estonia	1322.77	19668.72	14869.40	12615.49	9537.21	32284.21	24406.61
Ethiopia	126527.06	3616.30	28.58	7395.87	58.45	11012.17	87.03
Finland	5545.48	82355.46	14850.93	33837.22	6101.77	116192.68	20952.70
Fiji	936.38	1016.71	1085.79	2030.50	2168.47	3047.21	3254.26
Falkland Islands	3.79	327.67	86433.66				
France	67185.65	648480.73	9652.07	360094.89	5359.70	1008575.62	15011.77
Faroe Islands	53.27	1853.07	34786.37	441.26	8283.46	2294.33	43069.83
Federated States of Micronesia	115.22	106.00	919.95				
Gabon	2436.57	7700.00	3160.19	107.41	44.08	7807.41	3204.27
United Kingdom	67996.86	520690.64	7657.57	584214.40	8591.79	1104905.04	16249.35
Georgia	3728.28	6090.60	1633.62	7049.72	1890.88	13140.32	3524.50
Ghana	34121.99	15868.32	465.05	8661.54	253.84	24529.86	718.89
Gibraltar	32.69	320.00	9789.53				
Guinea	14190.61	9635.86	679.03	152.82	10.77	9788.68	689.80
Gambia	2773.17	39.85	14.37	357.08	128.76	396.93	143.13
Guinea-Bissau	2150.84	232.54	108.12	41.29	19.20	273.83	127.31
Equatorial Guinea	1714.67	5200.00	3032.65	145.51	84.86	5345.51	3117.51
Greece	10341.28	55047.35	5323.07	53080.56	5132.88	108127.91	10455.95
Grenada	126.18	46.05	364.95	787.95	6244.50	834.00	6609.45
Greenland	56.64	908.14	16032.70				
Guatemala	18092.03	14198.72	784.81	4273.16	236.19	18471.88	1021.00
Guam	172.95	22.70	131.25				
Guyana	813.83	13058.50	16045.66	279.06	342.90	13337.56	16388.55
Hong Kong	7491.61	573871.01	76601.84	97645.34	13033.96	671516.35	89635.80
Honduras	10593.80	11376.40	1073.87	3716.06	350.78	15092.46	1424.65
Croatia	4008.62	24894.27	6210.19	24142.57	6022.67	49036.84	12232.86
Haiti	11724.76	896.41	76.45	139.01	11.86	1035.42	88.31
Hungary	10156.24	160954.78	15847.87	36101.32	3554.60	197056.10	19402.47
Indonesia	277534.12	258857.34	932.70	33276.23	119.90	292133.57	1052.60
India	1428627.66	432000.87	302.39	337541.58	236.27	769542.45	538.66
Ireland	5056.94	209498.76	41428.01	397566.26	78618.03	607065.02	120046.04
Iran	89172.77	91188.16	1022.60	11715.10	131.38	102903.26	1153.98
Iraq	45504.56	115952.00	2548.14	12139.44	266.77	128091.44	2814.91
Iceland	375.32	6609.48	17610.35	6634.92	17678.13	13244.40	35288.48
Israel	9174.52	66892.70	7291.14	83235.97	9072.51	150128.67	16363.65
Italy	58870.76	676963.33	11499.14	147899.17	2512.27	824862.50	14011.41
Jamaica	2825.54	2107.16	745.75	5273.02	1866.20	7380.18	2611.95
Jordan	11337.05	12762.93	1125.77	9665.76	852.58	22428.69	1978.35
Japan	123294.51	717315.07	5817.90	206623.00	1675.85	923938.07	7493.75
Kazakhstan	19606.63	78532.90	4005.43	10288.02	524.72	88820.92	4530.15
Kenya	55100.59	7192.53	130.53	5443.00	98.78	12635.53	229.32
Kyrgyzstan	6735.35	3308.90	491.27	2313.77	343.53	5622.67	834.80
Cambodia	16944.83	23469.81	1385.07	4188.15	247.16	27657.96	1632.24
Kiribati	133.52	8.00	59.92	11.43	85.61	19.43	145.53
Saint Kitts and Nevis	47.76	24.46	512.20	546.76	11449.27	571.22	11961.47
South Korea	51784.06	632225.82	12208.89	123743.00	2389.60	755968.82	14598.49
Kuwait	4310.11	85408.60	19815.88	11301.69	2622.14	96710.29	22438.02
Laos	7633.78	8370.58	1096.52	1327.34	173.88	9697.92	1270.40
Lebanon	5353.93	3082.62	575.77	7921.52	1479.57	11004.14	2055.34
Liberia	5418.38	1100.00	203.01	230.17	42.48	1330.17	245.49
Libya	6888.39	35270.00	5120.21	368.93	53.56	35638.93	5173.77
Saint Lucia	180.25	76.88	426.52	1275.07	7073.86	1351.95	7500.37
Sri Lanka	21893.58	11910.70	544.03	5416.28	247.39	17326.98	791.42
Lesotho	2330.32	793.95	340.70	15.70	6.74	809.65	347.44
Lithuania	2718.35	42639.16	15685.67	21800.32	8019.68	64439.48	23705.35
Luxembourg	654.77	17147.89	26189.26	148671.19	227059.34	165819.08	253248.60
Latvia	1830.21	22446.03	12264.18	8123.57	4438.60	30569.60	16702.77
Macau	704.15	1654.34	2349.42	38644.63	54881.32	40298.97	57230.74
Saint Martin	32.08						
Morocco	37840.04	41641.75	1100.47	25430.69	672.06	67072.44	1772.53
Moldova	3435.93	4048.60	1178.31	2439.76	710.07	6488.36	1888.38
Madagascar	30325.73	3213.01	105.95	1246.49	41.10	4459.50	147.05
Maldives	521.02	421.39	808.78	4458.25	8556.76	4879.64	9365.53
Mexico	128455.57	593011.65	4616.47	52250.97	406.76	645262.62	5023.24
Marshall Islands	42.00	58.82	1400.61				
North Macedonia	2085.68	8999.20	4314.76	2865.09	1373.70	11864.29	5688.45
Mali	23293.70	5320.78	228.42	586.47	25.18	5907.25	253.60
Malta	535.06	3468.48	6482.36	25489.41	47638.06	28957.89	54120.42
Myanmar	54578.00	13593.50	249.07	2037.85	37.34	15631.35	286.40
Montenegro	626.49	679.46	1084.56	2993.82	4778.76	3673.28	5863.32
Mongolia	3447.16	15184.50	4404.93	1586.97	460.37	16771.47	4865.30
Northern Mariana Islands	49.80	4.61	92.58				
Mozambique	33897.35	8276.43	244.16	1012.22	29.86	9288.65	274.02
Mauritania	4862.99	4017.36	826.11	319.30	65.66	4336.66	891.77
Montserrat	4.39	5.54	1263.11	14.34	3269.49	19.88	4532.60
Mauritius	1300.56	2299.56	1768.13	3199.67	2460.23	5499.23	4228.37
Malawi	20931.75	880.00	42.04	471.47	22.52	1351.47	64.57
Malaysia	34308.53	312845.96	9118.61	42671.31	1243.75	355517.27	10362.36
Namibia	2604.17	5930.00	2277.12	995.19	382.15	6925.19	2659.27
New Caledonia	292.99	2130.71	7272.27	681.00	2324.30	2811.71	9596.57
Niger	27202.84	1097.49	40.34	319.52	11.75	1417.01	52.09
Nigeria	223804.63	57890.26	258.66	4440.60	19.84	62330.86	278.51
Nicaragua	7046.31	7378.49	1047.14	1561.30	221.58	8939.79	1268.72
Niue	1.94	0.84	434.11				
Netherlands	17618.30	934567.92	53045.30	311828.62	17699.13	1246396.54	70744.43
Norway	5474.36	173906.06	31767.38	50943.03	9305.75	224849.09	41073.13
Nepal	30896.59	1014.54	32.84	1640.32	53.09	2654.86	85.93
Nauru	12.78	44.32	3467.92	7.31	571.99	51.63	4039.91
New Zealand	5228.10	41482.93	7934.61	15472.67	2959.52	56955.60	10894.13
Oman	4644.38	62736.00	13507.93	3682.23	792.83	66418.23	14300.76
Pakistan	240485.66	28488.00	118.46	7511.88	31.24	35999.88	149.70
Panama	4468.09	15712.83	3516.68	17473.08	3910.64	33185.91	7427.32
Peru	34352.72	60755.63	1768.58	5808.17	169.07	66563.80	1937.66
Philippines	117337.37	72917.90	621.44	48284.64	411.50	121202.54	1032.94
Palau	18.06	1.85	102.45				
Papua New Guinea	10329.93	12036.36	1165.19	147.13	14.24	12183.49	1179.44
Poland	41026.07	381517.24	9299.39	108004.00	2632.57	489521.24	11931.96
North Korea	26160.82	347.00	13.26	0.00	0.00	347.00	13.26
Portugal	10247.61	83901.15	8187.39	55895.10	5454.45	139796.25	13641.85
Paraguay	6861.52	11890.54	1732.93	2455.36	357.84	14345.90	2090.77
Palestine	5371.23	1455.77	271.03	890.36	165.76	2346.13	436.80
French Polynesia	308.87	184.12	596.10	2226.07	7207.10	2410.19	7803.20
Qatar	2716.39	97365.24	35843.60	30974.45	11402.80	128339.69	47246.40
Romania	19892.81	100611.79	5057.70	43748.79	2199.23	144360.58	7256.92
Russia	144444.36	423915.00	2934.80	41208.93	285.29	465123.93	3220.09
Rwanda	14094.68	2478.75	175.86	1043.22	74.02	3521.97	249.88
Saudi Arabia	36947.03	322255.55	8722.10	48512.07	1313.02	370767.62	10035.11
Sudan	48109.01	4780.00	99.36	458.73	9.54	5238.73	108.89
Senegal	17763.16	5312.72	299.09	1518.68	85.50	6831.40	384.58
Singapore	6014.72	476251.52	79180.96	328050.59	54541.26	804302.11	133722.22
Saint Helena, Ascension and Tristan da Cunha	5.31	94.57	17796.39				
Solomon Islands	740.42	427.07	576.79	115.25	155.65	542.32	732.45
Sierra Leone	8791.09	1270.20	144.49	74.06	8.42	1344.26	152.91
El Salvador	6364.94	6498.09	1020.92	5108.56	802.61	11606.65	1823.53
Somalia	18143.38	940.00	51.81	1177.95	64.92	2117.95	116.73
Saint Pierre and Miquelon	5.84	1.06	181.51				
Serbia	8812.67	30934.76	3510.26	14143.45	1604.90	45078.21	5115.16
South Sudan	11088.80	833.23	75.14	842.41	75.97	1675.64	151.11
São Tomé and Príncipe	231.86	19.96	86.09	84.98	366.52	104.94	452.61
Suriname	623.24	2498.26	4008.53	173.47	278.34	2671.73	4286.87
Slovakia	5795.20	117315.54	20243.57	12563.37	2167.89	129878.91	22411.47
Slovenia	2119.68	73033.63	34455.11	12812.92	6044.76	85846.55	40499.86
Sweden	10612.09	197859.72	18644.75	104132.88	9812.67	301992.60	28457.42
Eswatini	1210.82	1762.15	1455.33	149.06	123.11	1911.21	1578.44
Sint Maarten	44.22	299.79	6779.20	1272.91	28784.54	1572.70	35563.75
Seychelles	107.66	541.48	5029.54	1833.11	17026.84	2374.59	22056.38
Syria	23227.01	5470.00	235.50	399.50	17.20	5869.50	252.70
Turks and Caicos Islands	46.06	4.37	94.87	1380.29	29965.92	1384.66	30060.79
Chad	18278.57	3700.00	202.42	302.05	16.52	4002.05	218.95
Togo	9053.80	1433.99	158.39	714.06	78.87	2148.05	237.25
Thailand	71801.28	284561.80	3963.19	56662.20	789.15	341224.00	4752.34
Tajikistan	10143.54	1717.70	169.34	243.52	24.01	1961.22	193.35
Tokelau	1.89	0.19	100.37				
Turkmenistan	6516.10	9917.00	1521.92	3437.95	527.61	13354.95	2049.53
Timor-Leste	1360.60	294.93	216.77	69.41	51.01	364.34	267.78
Tonga	107.77	9.16	84.99	94.06	872.76	103.22	957.75
Trinidad and Tobago	1534.94	8925.40	5814.83	1165.86	759.55	10091.26	6574.38
Tunisia	12458.22	19985.40	1604.19	10310.84	827.63	30296.24	2431.83
Turkey	85816.20	255777.40	2980.53	101684.00	1184.90	357461.40	4165.43
Tuvalu	11.40	0.04	3.51	5.30	465.08	5.34	468.59
Taiwan	23923.28	432336.54	18071.80	54007.00	2257.51	486343.54	20329.30
Tanzania	67438.11	7291.52	108.12	6261.05	92.84	13552.57	200.96
Uganda	48582.33	6162.15	126.84	2056.15	42.32	8218.30	169.16
Ukraine	36744.63	36040.00	980.82	16415.00	446.73	52455.00	1427.56
Uruguay	3423.11	9192.92	2685.55	6209.72	1814.06	15402.64	4499.61
United States	343355.63	2019542.00	5881.78	1026596.00	2989.89	3046138.00	8871.67
Uzbekistan	35163.94	20044.68	570.04	5117.66	145.54	25162.34	715.57
Saint Vincent and the Grenadines	103.70	42.78	412.54	293.45	2829.85	336.23	3242.40
Venezuela	28838.50	8470.00	293.70	674.59	23.39	9144.59	317.10
British Virgin Islands	31.54	21.40	678.55				
Vietnam	98858.95	353781.83	3578.65	19594.00	198.20	373375.83	3776.85
Vanuatu	334.51	62.70	187.44	231.64	692.48	294.34	879.92
Wallis and Futuna	11.50	0.15	13.04				
Samoa	225.68	42.42	187.96	303.82	1346.24	346.24	1534.20
Yemen	34449.83	226.00	6.56	365.79	10.62	591.79	17.18
South Africa	60414.50	110855.34	1834.91	14188.19	234.85	125043.53	2069.76
Zambia	20569.74	9651.80	469.22	932.80	45.35	10584.60	514.57
Zimbabwe	16665.41	7225.20	433.54	435.72	26.15	7660.92	459.69
Developed economies	1343765.15	13295050.54	9893.88	5565855.84	4141.99	18860906.38	14035.87
Developed economies: Americas	382263.47	2589735.75	6774.74	1164914.70	3047.41	3754650.45	9822.15
Developed economies: Asia	184253.09	1416433.60	7687.43	437700.53	2375.54	1854134.13	10062.97
Developed economies: Europe	745581.38	8876532.41	11905.52	3874044.39	5196.00	12750576.80	17101.52
Developed economies: Oceania	31667.21	412348.78	13021.32	89196.22	2816.67	501545.00	15837.99
Developing economies	6701202.12	10488538.42	1565.17	2347595.28	350.32	12836133.70	1915.50
Developing economies: Africa	1459163.98	598316.66	410.04	149602.96	102.53	747919.62	512.57
Developing economies: Americas	660563.08	1396285.84	2113.78	256970.35	389.02	1653256.19	2502.80
Developing economies: Asia	4567566.50	8477393.58	1856.00	1934853.80	423.61	10412247.38	2279.60
Developing economies: Oceania	13908.56	16542.34	1189.36	6168.16	443.48	22710.50	1632.84
Developing economies excluding China	5275530.76	7108513.92	1347.45	1966474.70	372.75	9074988.62	1720.20
Developing economies excluding LDCs	5550067.92	10231654.94	1843.52	2299221.25	414.27	12530876.19	2257.79
LDCs (Least developed countries)	1151134.20	256883.48	223.16	48245.89	41.91	305129.37	265.07
LDCs: Africa	775594.96	151046.30	194.75	30777.32	39.68	181823.62	234.43
LDCs: Asia	360484.61	104160.14	288.94	16922.56	46.94	121082.70	335.89
LDCs: Islands and Haiti	15054.63	1677.04	111.40	546.01	36.27	2223.05	147.67
LLDCs (Landlocked Developing Countries)	576816.43	271654.50	470.95	63984.21	110.93	335638.71	581.88
SIDS (Small Island Developing States) (UN-OHRLLS)	70900.08	567289.32	8001.25	397472.21	5606.09	964761.53	13607.34
SIDS: Atlantic and Indian Ocean		28862.58		12058.26		40920.84	
SIDS: Caribbean		45338.29		51125.79		96464.08	
SIDS: Pacific		493088.45		334288.16		827376.61	
Low-income developing economies (UN)	1122751.46	152598.84	135.92	42420.93	37.78	195019.77	173.70
Middle-income developing economies (UN)	3108061.63	1964337.58	632.01	649350.69	208.92	2613688.27	840.94
High-income developing economies (UN)	2469440.45	8370771.08	3389.74	1655810.95	670.52	10026582.03	4060.26
BRICS	3275580.32	4686491.47	1430.74	819253.15	250.11	5505744.62	1680.85
European Union	451007.10	7194388.75	15951.83	3007420.00	6668.23	10201808.75	22620.06
G20 (Group of Twenty)	4952765.67	18207465.67	3676.22	4169999.17	841.95	22377464.84	4518.18
G77	6384692.43	8511277.92	1333.08	1958348.54	306.73	10469626.46	1639.80
OECD (Organisation for Economic Cooperation and Development)	1390905.64	13564360.38	9752.18	5522993.95	3970.79	19087354.33	13722.97
Notes: Merchandise exports show the "free on board" (f.o.b.) value of goods provided to the rest of the world valued in current U.S. dollars. Services refer to economic output of intangible commodities that may be produced, transferred, and consumed at the same time. Services account (BPM6) contains 12 standard components. Commercial services comprise all services categories except government goods and services, n.i.e.. Commercial services are sub-divided into goods-related services, transport, travel, and other commercial services. For more information, see Manual on Statistics of International Trade in Services 2002 (MSITS 2002). Population refers to de facto population in a country, area or region as of 1 July of the indicated year.

== World Trade Organization ==
Total exports per capita (USD current prices) – World Trade Organization
Country/Territory/Region/Group	Population 2023	Merchandise exports	Merchandise exports per capita	Service exports	Service exports per capita	Total exports	Total exports per capita
Country/Territory/Region/Group	(thousands)	(millions USD)	(USD)	(millions USD)	(USD)	(millions USD)	(USD)
(United Nations) WORLD	8045311.45	23783494.36	2956.19	7913451.0	983.61	31696945.36	3939.80
Aruba	106.28	147.18	1384.86	3030.0	28510.40	3177.18	29895.26
Afghanistan	42239.85	903.00	21.38	984.9	23.32	1887.88	44.69
Angola	36684.20	38351.20	1045.44	75.9	2.07	38427.05	1047.51
Anguilla	15.90	14.99	942.60	209.4	13172.53	224.42	14115.13
Albania	2832.44	4324.44	1526.75	7193.3	2539.60	11517.69	4066.35
Andorra	80.09	252.37	3151.10				
United Arab Emirates	9516.87	487778.00	51254.03	166150.5	17458.52	653928.45	68712.55
Argentina	45773.88	66787.00	1459.06	16522.7	360.96	83309.73	1820.03
Armenia	2777.97	8415.20	3029.26	5619.4	2022.85	14034.63	5052.12
Antigua and Barbuda	94.30	26.74	283.60	1122.7	11905.66	1149.42	12189.26
Australia	26439.11	370865.86	14027.17	73723.6	2788.43	444589.42	16815.60
Austria	8958.96	223549.25	24952.59	89709.6	10013.40	313258.86	34965.98
Azerbaijan	10412.65	33898.60	3255.52	6285.2	603.62	40183.84	3859.14
Burundi	13238.56	204.19	15.42	108.1	8.16	312.25	23.59
Belgium	11686.14	562438.96	48128.72	146304.3	12519.47	708743.26	60648.19
Benin	13712.83	4070.53	296.84	612.3	44.65	4682.80	341.49
Caribbean Netherlands	27.15	1.20	44.38				
Burkina Faso	23251.49	4308.93	185.32	528.2	22.72	4837.13	208.04
Bangladesh	172954.32	55787.86	322.56	6378.3	36.88	62166.13	359.44
Bulgaria	6687.72	47854.31	7155.55	15254.4	2280.96	63108.75	9436.52
Bahrain	1485.51	25235.11	16987.51	15530.3	10454.54	40765.43	27442.06
Bahamas	412.62	707.61	1714.89	4354.5	10553.31	5062.15	12268.21
Bosnia and Herzegovina	3210.85	9232.38	2875.37	3282.1	1022.18	12514.45	3897.55
Belarus	9498.24	40168.20	4229.02	8503.9	895.31	48672.05	5124.32
Belize	410.83	488.07	1188.03	974.0	2370.91	1462.10	3558.94
Bermuda	64.07	27.43	428.15	1606.7	25077.65	1634.13	25505.80
Bolivia	12388.57	11018.35	889.40	1196.9	96.61	12215.23	986.01
Brazil	216422.45	339695.77	1569.60	45193.9	208.82	384889.64	1778.42
Barbados	282.00	486.08	1723.73	1398.3	4958.67	1884.40	6682.40
Brunei	452.52	9090.35	20088.09	340.0	751.36	9430.36	20839.46
Bhutan	787.42	794.85	1009.43	128.1	162.73	922.99	1172.16
Botswana	2675.35	5423.74	2027.30	641.0	239.60	6064.75	2266.90
Central African Republic	5742.32	136.72	23.81	226.2	39.39	362.92	63.20
Canada	38781.29	569257.11	14678.65	136712.0	3525.20	705969.11	18203.86
Switzerland	8796.67	420170.01	47764.67	168928.9	19203.73	589098.90	66968.41
Chile	19629.59	94937.00	4836.42	9699.8	494.14	104636.82	5330.57
China	1425671.35	3380024.48	2370.83	381120.6	267.33	3761145.06	2638.16
Ivory Coast	28873.03	20263.41	701.81	1036.0	35.88	21299.38	737.69
Cameroon	28647.29	4400.00	153.59	2422.6	84.57	6822.57	238.16
Democratic Republic of the Congo	102262.81	16400.00	160.37	50.3	0.49	16450.25	160.86
Republic of the Congo	6106.87	5970.00	977.59	618.4	101.26	6588.39	1078.85
Cook Islands	17.04	6.57	385.47				
Colombia	52085.17	49544.90	951.23	15155.7	290.98	64700.61	1242.21
Comoros	852.08	30.64	35.96	120.6	141.56	151.26	177.52
Cape Verde	598.68	54.47	90.98	713.7	1192.04	768.12	1283.01
Costa Rica	5212.17	19025.19	3650.15	15388.2	2952.36	34413.40	6602.51
Cuba	11194.45	1939.00	173.21	8773.6	783.75	10712.61	956.96
Curaçao	192.08	533.25	2776.23	1546.4	8051.15	2079.69	10827.38
Cayman Islands	69.31	36.55	527.34	4043.3	58336.75	4079.87	58864.09
Cyprus	915.96	4453.35	4861.94	24098.6	26309.56	28551.91	31171.50
Czech Republic	10495.30	255450.48	24339.52	39707.0	3783.32	295157.50	28122.84
Germany	83294.63	1688419.22	20270.44	438894.0	5269.18	2127313.22	25539.62
Djibouti	1136.46	5001.60	4401.05	1097.6	965.84	6099.23	5366.89
Dominica	73.04	15.29	209.35	161.9	2216.32	177.17	2425.67
Denmark	5910.91	136630.58	23114.97	114371.0	19349.13	251001.58	42464.10
Dominican Republic	11332.97	12935.30	1141.39	12910.8	1139.22	25846.10	2280.61
Algeria	45606.48	51798.74	1135.78	3830.4	83.99	55629.13	1219.76
Ecuador	18190.48	31126.42	1711.14	3156.4	173.52	34282.78	1884.65
Egypt	112716.60	39852.85	353.57	33648.6	298.52	73501.47	652.09
Eritrea	3748.90	495.20	132.09	549.3	146.52	1044.48	278.61
Spain	47519.63	423220.67	8906.23	197975.0	4166.17	621195.67	13072.40
Estonia	1322.77	19668.72	14869.40	12615.5	9537.21	32284.21	24406.61
Ethiopia	126527.06	3616.30	28.58	7395.9	58.45	11012.17	87.03
Finland	5545.48	82355.46	14850.93	33837.2	6101.77	116192.68	20952.70
Fiji	936.38	1016.71	1085.79	2030.5	2168.47	3047.21	3254.26
Falkland Islands	3.79						
France	67185.65	648480.73	9652.07	360094.9	5359.70	1008575.62	15011.77
Faroe Islands	53.27			441.3	8283.46		
Federated States of Micronesia	115.22	106.00	919.95				
Gabon	2436.57	7700.00	3160.19	107.4	44.08	7807.41	3204.27
United Kingdom	67996.86	520690.64	7657.57	584214.4	8591.79	1104905.04	16249.35
Georgia	3728.28	6090.60	1633.62	7049.7	1890.88	13140.32	3524.50
Ghana	34121.99	15868.32	465.05	8661.5	253.84	24529.86	718.89
Gibraltar	32.69						
Guinea	14190.61	9635.86	679.03	152.8	10.77	9788.68	689.80
Gambia	2773.17	39.85	14.37	357.1	128.76	396.93	143.13
Guinea-Bissau	2150.84	232.55	108.12	41.3	19.20	273.84	127.32
Equatorial Guinea	1714.67	5200.00	3032.65	145.5	84.86	5345.51	3117.51
Greece	10341.28	55047.35	5323.07	53080.6	5132.88	108127.91	10455.95
Grenada	126.18	46.06	364.99	788.0	6244.50	834.01	6609.49
Greenland	56.64	908.14	16032.71				
Guatemala	18092.03	14198.72	784.81	4273.2	236.19	18471.88	1021.00
Guam	172.95	22.70	131.25				
Guyana	813.83	13058.50	16045.66	279.1	342.90	13337.56	16388.55
Hong Kong	7491.61	573871.01	76601.84	97645.3	13033.96	671516.35	89635.80
Honduras	10593.80	11376.40	1073.87	3716.1	350.78	15092.46	1424.65
Croatia	4008.62	24894.27	6210.19	24142.6	6022.67	49036.84	12232.86
Haiti	11724.76	896.41	76.45	139.0	11.86	1035.42	88.31
Hungary	10156.24	160954.78	15847.87	36101.3	3554.60	197056.10	19402.47
Indonesia	277534.12	258857.34	932.70	33276.2	119.90	292133.57	1052.60
India	1428627.66	432000.87	302.39	337541.6	236.27	769542.45	538.66
Ireland	5056.94	209498.76	41428.01	397566.3	78618.03	607065.02	120046.04
Iran	89172.77	91188.16	1022.60	11715.1	131.38	102903.26	1153.98
Iraq	45504.56	115952.00	2548.14	12139.4	266.77	128091.44	2814.91
Iceland	375.32	6609.48	17610.36	6634.9	17678.13	13244.40	35288.49
Israel	9174.52	66892.70	7291.14	83236.0	9072.51	150128.67	16363.65
Italy	58870.76	676963.33	11499.14	147899.2	2512.27	824862.50	14011.41
Jamaica	2825.54	2107.17	745.76	5273.0	1866.20	7380.19	2611.95
Jordan	11337.05	12762.93	1125.77	9665.8	852.58	22428.69	1978.35
Japan	123294.51	717315.07	5817.90	206623.0	1675.85	923938.07	7493.75
Kazakhstan	19606.63	78532.90	4005.42	10288.0	524.72	88820.92	4530.15
Kenya	55100.59	7192.53	130.53	5443.0	98.78	12635.53	229.32
Kyrgyzstan	6735.35	3308.90	491.27	2313.8	343.53	5622.67	834.80
Cambodia	16944.83	23469.81	1385.07	4188.2	247.16	27657.96	1632.24
Kiribati	133.52	8.00	59.92	11.4	85.61	19.43	145.53
Saint Kitts and Nevis	47.76	24.46	512.28	546.8	11449.27	571.22	11961.55
South Korea	51784.06	632225.82	12208.89	123743.0	2389.60	755968.82	14598.49
Kuwait	4310.11	85408.60	19815.88	11301.7	2622.14	96710.29	22438.02
Laos	7633.78	8370.58	1096.52	1327.3	173.88	9697.92	1270.40
Lebanon	5353.93	3082.62	575.77	7921.5	1479.57	11004.14	2055.34
Liberia	5418.38	1100.00	203.01	230.2	42.48	1330.17	245.49
Libya	6888.39	35270.00	5120.21	368.9	53.56	35638.93	5173.77
Saint Lucia	180.25	76.88	426.54	1275.1	7073.86	1351.95	7500.40
Sri Lanka	21893.58	11910.70	544.03	5416.3	247.39	17326.98	791.42
Lesotho	2330.32	793.95	340.71	15.7	6.74	809.65	347.44
Lithuania	2718.35	42639.16	15685.66	21800.3	8019.68	64439.48	23705.35
Luxembourg	654.77	17147.89	26189.26	148671.2	227059.34	165819.08	253248.60
Latvia	1830.21	22446.03	12264.18	8123.6	4438.60	30569.60	16702.77
Macau	704.15	1654.34	2349.42	38644.6	54881.32	40298.97	57230.75
Saint Martin	32.08						
Morocco	37840.04	41641.75	1100.47	25430.7	672.06	67072.44	1772.53
Moldova	3435.93	4048.60	1178.31	2439.8	710.07	6488.36	1888.38
Madagascar	30325.73	3213.01	105.95	1246.5	41.10	4459.50	147.05
Maldives	521.02	421.39	808.78	4458.3	8556.76	4879.64	9365.53
Mexico	128455.57	593011.65	4616.47	52251.0	406.76	645262.62	5023.24
Marshall Islands	42.00	58.82	1400.61				
North Macedonia	2085.68	8999.20	4314.76	2865.1	1373.70	11864.29	5688.45
Mali	23293.70	5320.79	228.42	586.5	25.18	5907.26	253.60
Malta	535.06	3468.48	6482.37	25489.4	47638.06	28957.89	54120.43
Myanmar	54578.00	13593.50	249.07	2037.9	37.34	15631.35	286.40
Montenegro	626.49	679.46	1084.56	2993.8	4778.76	3673.28	5863.31
Mongolia	3447.16	15184.50	4404.93	1587.0	460.37	16771.47	4865.30
Northern Mariana Islands	49.80	4.61	92.66				
Mozambique	33897.35	8276.43	244.16	1012.2	29.86	9288.65	274.02
Mauritania	4862.99	4017.36	826.11	319.3	65.66	4336.66	891.77
Montserrat	4.39	5.54	1264.02	14.3	3269.49	19.88	4533.52
Mauritius	1300.56	2299.56	1768.14	3199.7	2460.23	5499.23	4228.37
Malawi	20931.75	880.00	42.04	471.5	22.52	1351.47	64.57
Malaysia	34308.53	312845.96	9118.61	42671.3	1243.75	355517.27	10362.36
Namibia	2604.17	5930.00	2277.12	995.2	382.15	6925.19	2659.27
New Caledonia	292.99	2130.71	7272.26	681.0	2324.30	2811.71	9596.57
Niger	27202.84	1097.49	40.34	319.5	11.75	1417.01	52.09
Nigeria	223804.63	57890.26	258.66	4440.6	19.84	62330.86	278.51
Nicaragua	7046.31	7378.49	1047.14	1561.3	221.58	8939.79	1268.72
Niue	1.94	0.84	432.04				
Netherlands	17618.30	934567.92	53045.30	311828.6	17699.13	1246396.54	70744.43
Norway	5474.36	173906.06	31767.38	50943.0	9305.75	224849.09	41073.13
Nepal	30896.59	1014.54	32.84	1640.3	53.09	2654.86	85.93
Nauru	12.78	44.32	3467.92	7.3	571.99	51.63	4039.91
New Zealand	5228.10	41482.93	7934.61	15472.7	2959.52	56955.60	10894.13
Oman	4644.38	62736.00	13507.93	3682.2	792.83	66418.23	14300.76
Pakistan	240485.66	28488.00	118.46	7511.9	31.24	35999.88	149.70
Panama	4468.09	15712.83	3516.68	17473.1	3910.64	33185.91	7427.32
Peru	34352.72	60755.63	1768.58	5808.2	169.07	66563.80	1937.66
Philippines	117337.37	72917.90	621.44	48284.6	411.50	121202.54	1032.94
Palau	18.06	1.85	102.67				
Papua New Guinea	10329.93	12036.36	1165.19	147.1	14.24	12183.49	1179.44
Poland	41026.07	381517.24	9299.39	108004.0	2632.57	489521.24	11931.96
North Korea	26160.82	347.00	13.26	0.0	0.00	347.00	13.26
Portugal	10247.61	83901.15	8187.39	55895.1	5454.45	139796.25	13641.85
Paraguay	6861.52	11890.54	1732.93	2455.4	357.84	14345.90	2090.77
Palestine	5371.23			890.4	165.76		
French Polynesia	308.87	184.12	596.10	2226.1	7207.10	2410.19	7803.19
Qatar	2716.39	97365.24	35843.60	30974.5	11402.80	128339.69	47246.40
Romania	19892.81	100611.79	5057.70	43748.8	2199.23	144360.58	7256.92
Russia	144444.36	423915.00	2934.80	41208.9	285.29	465123.93	3220.09
Rwanda	14094.68	2478.75	175.86	1043.2	74.02	3521.97	249.88
Saudi Arabia	36947.03	322255.55	8722.10	48512.1	1313.02	370767.62	10035.11
Sudan	48109.01	4780.00	99.36	458.7	9.54	5238.73	108.89
Senegal	17763.16	5312.72	299.09	1518.7	85.50	6831.40	384.58
Singapore	6014.72	476251.52	79180.96	328050.6	54541.26	804302.11	133722.22
Saint Helena, Ascension and Tristan da Cunha	5.31						
Solomon Islands	740.42	427.07	576.79	115.3	155.65	542.32	732.44
Sierra Leone	8791.09	1270.20	144.49	74.1	8.42	1344.26	152.91
El Salvador	6364.94	6498.09	1020.92	5108.6	802.61	11606.65	1823.53
Somalia	18143.38			1178.0	64.92		
Saint Pierre and Miquelon	5.84	1.06	182.02				
Serbia	8812.67	30934.76	3510.26	14143.5	1604.90	45078.21	5115.16
South Sudan	11088.80	833.23	75.14	842.4	75.97	1675.64	151.11
São Tomé and Príncipe	231.86	19.96	86.10	85.0	366.52	104.94	452.62
Suriname	623.24	2498.26	4008.53	173.5	278.34	2671.73	4286.87
Slovakia	5795.20	117315.54	20243.57	12563.4	2167.89	129878.91	22411.47
Slovenia	2119.68	73033.63	34455.11	12812.9	6044.76	85846.55	40499.87
Sweden	10612.09	197859.72	18644.75	104132.9	9812.67	301992.60	28457.42
Eswatini	1210.82	1762.15	1455.33	149.1	123.11	1911.21	1578.44
Sint Maarten	44.22	299.79	6779.16	1272.9	28784.54	1572.70	35563.70
Seychelles	107.66	541.48	5029.51	1833.1	17026.84	2374.59	22056.36
Syria	23227.01	5470.00	235.50	399.5	17.20	5869.50	252.70
Turks and Caicos Islands	46.06	4.37	94.94	1380.3	29965.92	1384.66	30060.86
Chad	18278.57	3700.00	202.42	302.1	16.52	4002.05	218.95
Togo	9053.80	1433.99	158.39	714.1	78.87	2148.05	237.25
Thailand	71801.28	284561.80	3963.19	56662.2	789.15	341224.00	4752.34
Tajikistan	10143.54	1717.70	169.34	243.5	24.01	1961.22	193.35
Tokelau	1.89	0.19	98.59				
Turkmenistan	6516.10	9917.00	1521.92	3438.0	527.61	13354.95	2049.53
Timor-Leste	1360.60	294.93	216.77	69.4	51.01	364.34	267.78
Tonga	107.77	9.16	84.99	94.1	872.76	103.22	957.75
Trinidad and Tobago	1534.94	8925.40	5814.83	1165.9	759.55	10091.26	6574.38
Tunisia	12458.22	19985.40	1604.19	10310.8	827.63	30296.24	2431.83
Turkey	85816.20	255777.40	2980.53	101684.0	1184.90	357461.40	4165.43
Tuvalu	11.40	0.04	3.07	5.3	465.08	5.34	468.15
Taiwan	23923.28	432336.54	18071.80	54007.0	2257.51	486343.54	20329.30
Tanzania	67438.11	7291.52	108.12	6261.1	92.84	13552.57	200.96
Uganda	48582.33	6162.15	126.84	2056.2	42.32	8218.30	169.16
Ukraine	36744.63	36040.00	980.82	16415.0	446.73	52455.00	1427.56
Uruguay	3423.11	9192.92	2685.55	6209.7	1814.06	15402.64	4499.61
United States	343355.63	2019541.97	5881.78	1026596.0	2989.89	3046137.97	8871.67
Uzbekistan	35163.94	20044.68	570.03	5117.7	145.54	25162.34	715.57
Saint Vincent and the Grenadines	103.70	42.78	412.52	293.5	2829.85	336.23	3242.38
Venezuela	28838.50	8470.00	293.70	674.6	23.39	9144.59	317.10
British Virgin Islands	31.54						
Vietnam	98858.95	353781.83	3578.65	19594.0	198.20	373375.83	3776.85
Vanuatu	334.51	62.70	187.45	231.6	692.48	294.34	879.93
Wallis and Futuna	11.50	0.15	13.39				
Samoa	225.68	42.42	187.98	303.8	1346.24	346.24	1534.21
Yemen	34449.83	226.00	6.56	365.8	10.62	591.79	17.18
South Africa	60414.50	110855.34	1834.91	14188.2	234.85	125043.53	2069.76
Zambia	20569.74	9651.80	469.22	932.8	45.35	10584.60	514.57
Zimbabwe	16665.41	7225.20	433.54	435.7	26.15	7660.92	459.69
Developed economies	1343765.15			5565855.8	4141.99		
Developed economies: Americas	382263.47			1164914.7	3047.41		
Developed economies: Asia	184253.09			437700.5	2375.54		
Developed economies: Europe	745581.38			3874044.4	5196.00		
Developed economies: Oceania	31667.21			89196.2	2816.67		
Developing economies	6701202.12			2347595.3	350.32		
Developing economies: Africa	1459163.98			149603.0	102.53		
Developing economies: Americas	660563.08			256970.4	389.02		
Developing economies: Asia	4567566.50			1934853.8	423.61		
Developing economies: Oceania	13908.56			6168.2	443.48		
Developing economies excluding China	5275530.76			1966474.7	372.75		
Developing economies excluding LDCs	5550067.92			2299221.3	414.27		
LDCs (Least developed countries)	1151134.20			48245.9	41.91		
LDCs: Africa	775594.96			30777.3	39.68		
LDCs: Asia	360484.61			16922.6	46.94		
LDCs: Islands and Haiti	15054.63			546.0	36.27		
LLDCs (Landlocked Developing Countries)	576816.43			63984.2	110.93		
SIDS (Small Island Developing States) (UN-OHRLLS)	70900.08			397472.2	5606.09		
SIDS: Atlantic and Indian Ocean				12058.3			
SIDS: Caribbean				51125.8			
SIDS: Pacific				334288.2			
Low-income developing economies (UN)	1122751.46			42420.9	37.78		
Middle-income developing economies (UN)	3108061.63			649350.7	208.92		
High-income developing economies (UN)	2469440.45			1655811.0	670.52		
BRICS	3275580.32			819253.2	250.11		
European Union	451007.10	7194389.54	15951.83	3007420.0	6668.23	10201809.54	22620.06
G20 (Group of Twenty)	4952765.67			4169999.2	841.95		
G77	6384692.43			1958348.5	306.73		
OECD (Organisation for Economic Cooperation and Development)	1390905.64			5522994.0	3970.79		
Notes: Merchandise exports show the "free on board" (f.o.b.) value of goods provided to the rest of the world valued in current U.S. dollars. Services refer to economic output of intangible commodities that may be produced, transferred, and consumed at the same time. Services account (BPM6) contains 12 standard components. Commercial services comprise all services categories except government goods and services, n.i.e.. Commercial services are sub-divided into goods-related services, transport, travel, and other commercial services. For more information, see Manual on Statistics of International Trade in Services 2002 (MSITS 2002). Population refers to de facto population in a country, area or region as of 1 July of the indicated year.

== World Bank ==
Total exports per capita (USD current prices) – World Bank
Country/Territory/Region/Group	Population 2023	Merchandise exports	Merchandise exports per capita	Service exports	Service exports per capita	Total exports	Total exports per capita
Country/Territory/Region/Group	(thousands)	(millions USD)	(USD)	(millions USD)	(USD)	(millions USD)	(USD)
(United Nations) WORLD	8045311.45	23900405.58	2970.72	7781055.06	967.15	31681460.64	3937.88
Aruba	106.28	147.00	1383.18				
Afghanistan	42239.85	903.00	21.38				
Angola	36684.20	38351.00	1045.44	75.85	2.07	38426.85	1047.50
Anguilla	15.90						
Albania	2832.44	4324.00	1526.60	7193.25	2539.59	11517.25	4066.19
Andorra	80.09	252.00	3146.54				
United Arab Emirates	9516.87	487778.00	51254.03				
Argentina	45773.88	66787.00	1459.06	16522.73	360.96	83309.73	1820.03
Armenia	2777.97	8415.00	3029.19	5619.43	2022.85	14034.43	5052.04
Antigua and Barbuda	94.30	27.00	286.33	1122.68	11905.63	1149.68	12191.96
Australia	26439.11	370866.00	14027.17	75348.83	2849.90	446214.83	16877.07
Austria	8958.96	223549.00	24952.56	89685.95	10010.75	313234.95	34963.32
Azerbaijan	10412.65	33899.00	3255.56	6285.24	603.62	40184.24	3859.17
Burundi	13238.56	204.00	15.41				
Belgium	11686.14	562439.00	48128.72	146276.65	12517.11	708715.65	60645.83
Benin	13712.83	4071.00	296.88				
Caribbean Netherlands	27.15						
Burkina Faso	23251.49	4309.00	185.32				
Bangladesh	172954.32	55788.00	322.56	6378.27	36.88	62166.27	359.44
Bulgaria	6687.72	47854.00	7155.51	15273.89	2283.87	63127.89	9439.38
Bahrain	1485.51	25235.00	16987.44	15530.32	10454.54	40765.32	27441.99
Bahamas	412.62	708.00	1715.85				
Bosnia and Herzegovina	3210.85	9232.00	2875.25	3282.07	1022.18	12514.07	3897.44
Belarus	9498.24	40168.00	4228.99	8503.85	895.31	48671.85	5124.30
Belize	410.83	488.00	1187.85	974.03	2370.91	1462.03	3558.76
Bermuda	64.07	27.00	421.42				
Bolivia	12388.57	11018.00	889.37	1196.88	96.61	12214.88	985.98
Brazil	216422.45	339696.00	1569.60	45193.87	208.82	384889.87	1778.42
Barbados	282.00	486.00	1723.43				
Brunei	452.52	9090.00	20087.33				
Bhutan	787.42	795.00	1009.62	128.14	162.73	923.14	1172.35
Botswana	2675.35	5424.00	2027.40				
Central African Republic	5742.32	137.00	23.86				
Canada	38781.29	569257.00	14678.65	145757.20	3758.44	715014.20	18437.09
Switzerland	8796.67	420170.00	47764.67	168928.89	19203.73	589098.89	66968.41
Chile	19629.59	94937.00	4836.42	9791.97	498.84	104728.97	5335.26
China	1425671.35	3380024.00	2370.83	332054.79	232.91	3712078.79	2603.74
Ivory Coast	28873.03	20263.00	701.80				
Cameroon	28647.29	4400.00	153.59				
Democratic Republic of the Congo	102262.81	16400.00	160.37				
Republic of the Congo	6106.87	5970.00	977.59				
Cook Islands	17.04						
Colombia	52085.17	49545.00	951.23	15256.23	292.91	64801.23	1244.14
Comoros	852.08	31.00	36.38				
Cape Verde	598.68	54.00	90.20	694.69	1160.36	748.69	1250.56
Costa Rica	5212.17	19025.00	3650.11	14842.48	2847.66	33867.48	6497.77
Cuba	11194.45	1939.00	173.21				
Curaçao	192.08	533.00	2774.93				
Cayman Islands	69.31	37.00	533.83				
Cyprus	915.96	4453.00	4861.56	24109.05	26321.02	28562.05	31182.57
Czech Republic	10495.30	255450.00	24339.48	39706.11	3783.23	295156.11	28122.71
Germany	83294.63	1688419.00	20270.44	439943.65	5281.78	2128362.65	25552.22
Djibouti	1136.46	5002.00	4401.41				
Dominica	73.04	15.00	205.37	161.88	2216.31	176.88	2421.68
Denmark	5910.91	136631.00	23115.04	114382.17	19351.02	251013.17	42466.06
Dominican Republic	11332.97	12935.00	1141.36	12910.80	1139.22	25845.80	2280.58
Algeria	45606.48	51799.00	1135.78	3830.39	83.99	55629.39	1219.77
Ecuador	18190.48	31126.00	1711.11	3156.36	173.52	34282.36	1884.63
Egypt	112716.60	39853.00	353.57				
Eritrea	3748.90	495.00	132.04				
Spain	47519.63	423221.00	8906.24	198125.80	4169.35	621346.80	13075.58
Estonia	1322.77	19669.00	14869.61	12617.25	9538.54	32286.25	24408.15
Ethiopia	126527.06	3616.00	28.58	7395.87	58.45	11011.87	87.03
Finland	5545.48	82355.00	14850.85	33830.03	6100.47	116185.03	20951.32
Fiji	936.38	1017.00	1086.10				
Falkland Islands	3.79						
France	67185.65	648481.00	9652.08	360163.17	5360.72	1008644.17	15012.79
Faroe Islands	53.27	1305.76	24512.05				
Federated States of Micronesia	115.22	106.00	919.95				
Gabon	2436.57	7700.00	3160.19				
United Kingdom	67996.86	520691.00	7657.57	584214.40	8591.79	1104905.40	16249.36
Georgia	3728.28	6091.00	1633.73	7049.72	1890.88	13140.72	3524.60
Ghana	34121.99	15868.00	465.04				
Gibraltar	32.69	307.00	9391.83				
Guinea	14190.61	9636.00	679.04				
Gambia	2773.17	40.00	14.42				
Guinea-Bissau	2150.84	233.00	108.33				
Equatorial Guinea	1714.67	5200.00	3032.65				
Greece	10341.28	55047.00	5323.04	53185.32	5143.01	108232.32	10466.05
Grenada	126.18	46.00	364.55	787.95	6244.53	833.95	6609.08
Greenland	56.64	908.00	16030.22				
Guatemala	18092.03	14199.00	784.82	4273.16	236.19	18472.16	1021.01
Guam	172.95	23.00	132.98				
Guyana	813.83	13059.00	16046.27				
Hong Kong	7491.61	573871.00	76601.84	98874.39	13198.02	672745.39	89799.85
Honduras	10593.80	11376.00	1073.84	3716.06	350.78	15092.06	1424.61
Croatia	4008.62	24894.00	6210.12	24216.77	6041.18	49110.77	12251.30
Haiti	11724.76	896.00	76.42				
Hungary	10156.24	160955.00	15847.89	36106.20	3555.08	197061.20	19402.97
Indonesia	277534.12	258857.00	932.70	33276.23	119.90	292133.23	1052.60
India	1428627.66	432001.00	302.39	337541.58	236.27	769542.58	538.66
Ireland	5056.94	209499.00	41428.06	397590.99	78622.92	607089.99	120050.98
Iran	89172.77	91188.00	1022.60				
Iraq	45504.56	115952.00	2548.14				
Iceland	375.32	6609.00	17609.07	6646.59	17709.22	13255.59	35318.28
Israel	9174.52	66893.00	7291.17	82693.40	9013.38	149586.40	16304.55
Italy	58870.76	676963.00	11499.14	148023.88	2514.39	824986.88	14013.52
Jamaica	2825.54	2107.00	745.70				
Jordan	11337.05	12763.00	1125.78				
Japan	123294.51	717315.00	5817.90	206912.58	1678.20	924227.58	7496.10
Kazakhstan	19606.63	78533.00	4005.43	10288.02	524.72	88821.02	4530.15
Kenya	55100.59	7193.00	130.54				
Kyrgyzstan	6735.35	3309.00	491.29				
Cambodia	16944.83	23470.00	1385.08	4188.15	247.16	27658.15	1632.25
Kiribati	133.52	8.00	59.92				
Saint Kitts and Nevis	47.76	24.00	502.57	546.76	11449.20	570.76	11951.76
South Korea	51784.06	632226.00	12208.89	124486.00	2403.94	756712.00	14612.84
Kuwait	4310.11	85409.00	19815.98	11301.69	2622.14	96710.69	22438.11
Laos	7633.78	8371.00	1096.57				
Lebanon	5353.93	3083.00	575.84	7921.52	1479.57	11004.52	2055.41
Liberia	5418.38	1100.00	203.01				
Libya	6888.39	35270.00	5120.21				
Saint Lucia	180.25	77.00	427.18	1275.07	7073.84	1352.07	7501.02
Sri Lanka	21893.58	11911.00	544.04	5416.28	247.39	17327.28	791.43
Lesotho	2330.32	794.00	340.73	15.70	6.74	809.70	347.46
Lithuania	2718.35	42639.00	15685.61	21805.60	8021.62	64444.60	23707.23
Luxembourg	654.77	17148.00	26189.43	148679.70	227072.33	165827.70	253261.76
Latvia	1830.21	22446.00	12264.16	8127.36	4440.67	30573.36	16704.83
Macau	704.15	1654.00	2348.93				
Saint Martin	32.08	139.00	4333.32				
Morocco	37840.04	41642.00	1100.47				
Moldova	3435.93	4049.00	1178.43	2439.76	710.07	6488.76	1888.50
Madagascar	30325.73	3213.00	105.95				
Maldives	521.02	421.00	808.03				
Mexico	128455.57	593012.00	4616.48	55732.37	433.86	648744.37	5050.34
Marshall Islands	42.00	59.00	1404.90				
North Macedonia	2085.68	8999.00	4314.66	2865.09	1373.70	11864.09	5688.36
Mali	23293.70	5321.00	228.43				
Malta	535.06	3468.00	6481.47				
Myanmar	54578.00	13594.00	249.07				
Montenegro	626.49	679.00	1083.82	2993.82	4778.75	3672.82	5862.58
Mongolia	3447.16	15185.00	4405.08	1586.97	460.37	16771.97	4865.45
Northern Mariana Islands	49.80	5.00	100.41				
Mozambique	33897.35	8276.00	244.15	1012.22	29.86	9288.22	274.01
Mauritania	4862.99	4017.00	826.04				
Montserrat	4.39						
Mauritius	1300.56	2300.00	1768.47	3199.67	2460.23	5499.67	4228.70
Malawi	20931.75	880.00	42.04				
Malaysia	34308.53	312846.00	9118.61	42671.31	1243.75	355517.31	10362.36
Namibia	2604.17	5930.00	2277.12	995.19	382.15	6925.19	2659.27
New Caledonia	292.99	2131.00	7273.26				
Niger	27202.84	1097.00	40.33				
Nigeria	223804.63	57890.00	258.66	4440.60	19.84	62330.60	278.50
Nicaragua	7046.31	7378.00	1047.07	1561.30	221.58	8939.30	1268.65
Niue	1.94						
Netherlands	17618.30	934568.00	53045.30	231043.42	13113.83	1165611.42	66159.13
Norway	5474.36	173906.00	31767.37	52088.37	9514.97	225994.37	41282.34
Nepal	30896.59	1015.00	32.85	1640.32	53.09	2655.32	85.94
Nauru	12.78	44.00	3442.88				
New Zealand	5228.10	41483.00	7934.62	16497.58	3155.56	57980.58	11090.18
Oman	4644.38	62736.00	13507.93				
Pakistan	240485.66	28488.00	118.46	7511.88	31.24	35999.88	149.70
Panama	4468.09	15713.00	3516.72	17473.07	3910.64	33186.07	7427.36
Peru	34352.72	60756.00	1768.59	5808.17	169.07	66564.17	1937.67
Philippines	117337.37	72918.00	621.44	48284.64	411.50	121202.64	1032.94
Palau	18.06	2.00	110.75				
Papua New Guinea	10329.93	12036.00	1165.16				
Poland	41026.07	381517.00	9299.38	108017.00	2632.89	489534.00	11932.27
North Korea	26160.82	347.00	13.26				
Portugal	10247.61	83901.00	8187.38	55950.19	5459.83	139851.19	13647.21
Paraguay	6861.52	11891.00	1733.00	2455.36	357.84	14346.36	2090.84
Palestine	5371.23						
French Polynesia	308.87	184.00	595.72				
Qatar	2716.39	97365.00	35843.51	30974.45	11402.80	128339.45	47246.31
Romania	19892.81	100612.00	5057.71	43750.98	2199.34	144362.98	7257.04
Russia	144444.36	423915.00	2934.80	41208.93	285.29	465123.93	3220.09
Rwanda	14094.68	2479.00	175.88	1043.22	74.02	3522.22	249.90
Saudi Arabia	36947.03	322256.00	8722.11	48512.07	1313.02	370768.07	10035.13
Sudan	48109.01	4780.00	99.36				
Senegal	17763.16	5313.00	299.10				
Singapore	6014.72	476252.00	79181.04	328050.59	54541.26	804302.59	133722.30
Saint Helena, Ascension and Tristan da Cunha	5.31						
Solomon Islands	740.42	427.00	576.70	115.25	155.66	542.25	732.36
Sierra Leone	8791.09	1270.00	144.46				
El Salvador	6364.94	6498.00	1020.90	5108.56	802.61	11606.56	1823.51
Somalia	18143.38						
Saint Pierre and Miquelon	5.84						
Serbia	8812.67	30935.00	3510.29	14143.45	1604.90	45078.45	5115.19
South Sudan	11088.80	833.00	75.12				
São Tomé and Príncipe	231.86	20.00	86.26				
Suriname	623.24	2498.00	4008.11	173.47	278.33	2671.47	4286.45
Slovakia	5795.20	117316.00	20243.65	12564.62	2168.11	129880.62	22411.76
Slovenia	2119.68	73034.00	34455.28	12819.07	6047.66	85853.07	40502.94
Sweden	10612.09	197860.00	18644.78	104126.04	9812.02	301986.04	28456.80
Eswatini	1210.82	1762.00	1455.21				
Sint Maarten	44.22	300.00	6783.95				
Seychelles	107.66	541.00	5025.08	1833.11	17026.80	2374.11	22051.88
Syria	23227.01	5470.00	235.50				
Turks and Caicos Islands	46.06	4.00	86.84				
Chad	18278.57	3700.00	202.42				
Togo	9053.80	1434.00	158.39				
Thailand	71801.28	284562.00	3963.19	56662.20	789.15	341224.20	4752.34
Tajikistan	10143.54	1718.00	169.37	243.52	24.01	1961.52	193.38
Tokelau	1.89						
Turkmenistan	6516.10	9917.00	1521.92				
Timor-Leste	1360.60	295.00	216.82	69.41	51.02	364.41	267.83
Tonga	107.77	9.00	83.51				
Trinidad and Tobago	1534.94	8925.00	5814.57				
Tunisia	12458.22	19985.00	1604.16				
Turkey	85816.20	255777.00	2980.52	101684.00	1184.90	357461.00	4165.43
Tuvalu	11.40	0.00					
Taiwan	23923.28						
Tanzania	67438.11	7292.00	108.13				
Uganda	48582.33	6162.00	126.84				
Ukraine	36744.63	36040.00	980.82	16415.00	446.73	52455.00	1427.56
Uruguay	3423.11	9193.00	2685.57	6209.72	1814.06	15402.72	4499.63
United States	343355.63	2019542.00	5881.78	999142.00	2909.93	3018684.00	8791.71
Uzbekistan	35163.94	20045.00	570.04	5117.66	145.54	25162.66	715.58
Saint Vincent and the Grenadines	103.70	43.00	414.67	293.45	2829.86	336.45	3244.53
Venezuela	28838.50	8470.00	293.70				
British Virgin Islands	31.54						
Vietnam	98858.95	353782.00	3578.65	19594.00	198.20	373376.00	3776.86
Vanuatu	334.51	63.00	188.34				
Wallis and Futuna	11.50						
Samoa	225.68	42.00	186.10	303.82	1346.23	345.82	1532.34
Yemen	34449.83	226.00	6.56				
South Africa	60414.50	110855.00	1834.91	14188.19	234.85	125043.19	2069.75
Zambia	20569.74	9652.00	469.23				
Zimbabwe	16665.41	7225.00	433.53				
Developed economies	1343765.15						
Developed economies: Americas	382263.47						
Developed economies: Asia	184253.09						
Developed economies: Europe	745581.38						
Developed economies: Oceania	31667.21						
Developing economies	6701202.12						
Developing economies: Africa	1459163.98						
Developing economies: Americas	660563.08						
Developing economies: Asia	4567566.50						
Developing economies: Oceania	13908.56						
Developing economies excluding China	5275530.76						
Developing economies excluding LDCs	5550067.92						
LDCs (Least developed countries)	1151134.20	258021.79	224.15				
LDCs: Africa	775594.96						
LDCs: Asia	360484.61						
LDCs: Islands and Haiti	15054.63						
LLDCs (Landlocked Developing Countries)	576816.43						
SIDS (Small Island Developing States) (UN-OHRLLS)	70900.08						
SIDS: Atlantic and Indian Ocean							
SIDS: Caribbean		17471.00					
SIDS: Pacific		1777.25					
Low-income developing economies (UN)	1122751.46						
Middle-income developing economies (UN)	3108061.63						
High-income developing economies (UN)	2469440.45						
BRICS	3275580.32						
European Union	451007.10	7194388.00	15951.83	2903343.60	6437.47	10097731.60	22389.30
G20 (Group of Twenty)	4952765.67						
G77	6384692.43						
OECD (Organisation for Economic Cooperation and Development)	1390905.64	13564361.00	9752.18	5432793.07	3905.94	18997154.07	13658.12
Notes: Merchandise exports show the "free on board" (f.o.b.) value of goods provided to the rest of the world valued in current U.S. dollars. Services refer to economic output of intangible commodities that may be produced, transferred, and consumed at the same time. Services account (BPM6) contains 12 standard components. Commercial services comprise all services categories except government goods and services, n.i.e.. Commercial services are sub-divided into goods-related services, transport, travel, and other commercial services. For more information, see Manual on Statistics of International Trade in Services 2002 (MSITS 2002). Population refers to de facto population in a country, area or region as of 1 July of the indicated year.
