= Awaza Convention Center =

Turkmen convention center

Coordinates: 39.939917°N 52.886348°E

The Awaza Congress Center (Turkmen: Kongresler merkezi) is located in the Awaza Borough of the city of Türkmenbaşy, Turkmenistan. It is one of the largest conference centres in the world. It is used for conventions, exhibitions and concerts. It opened in September 2015. The concept behind this iconic building was developed to offer a distinctive contribution at both the national and international levels. The green colour of the building is based after the flag of Turkmenistan.

== Overview ==
Built by Turkish construction firm Polimeks, work on the project began in November 2012 and ended in September 2015. The center was opened by President of Turkmenistan Gurbanguly Berdimuhamedow on 8 September 2015.

== Halls ==
The Awaza Congress Center consists of two conference halls with 2000 and 476 seats, one banquet hall with a capacity of 450 and 256 persons depending on seating or buffet arrangement, and a press conference hall with a capacity of 128 persons. The Congress Center also houses a 130-capacity multipurpose meeting room for heads of states, a hall for signing bilateral protocols, and a meeting hall for government delegations.

== Events ==
On September 10, 2015, a meeting of the People's Council of Turkmenistan was held in the Convention Center.
