= Awaza =

Borough of Turkmenbashy, Balkan Province, Turkmenistan

Coordinates: 39°57′07.39″N 52°51′30.96″E

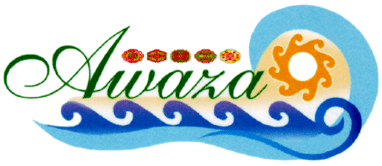
The resort's logo

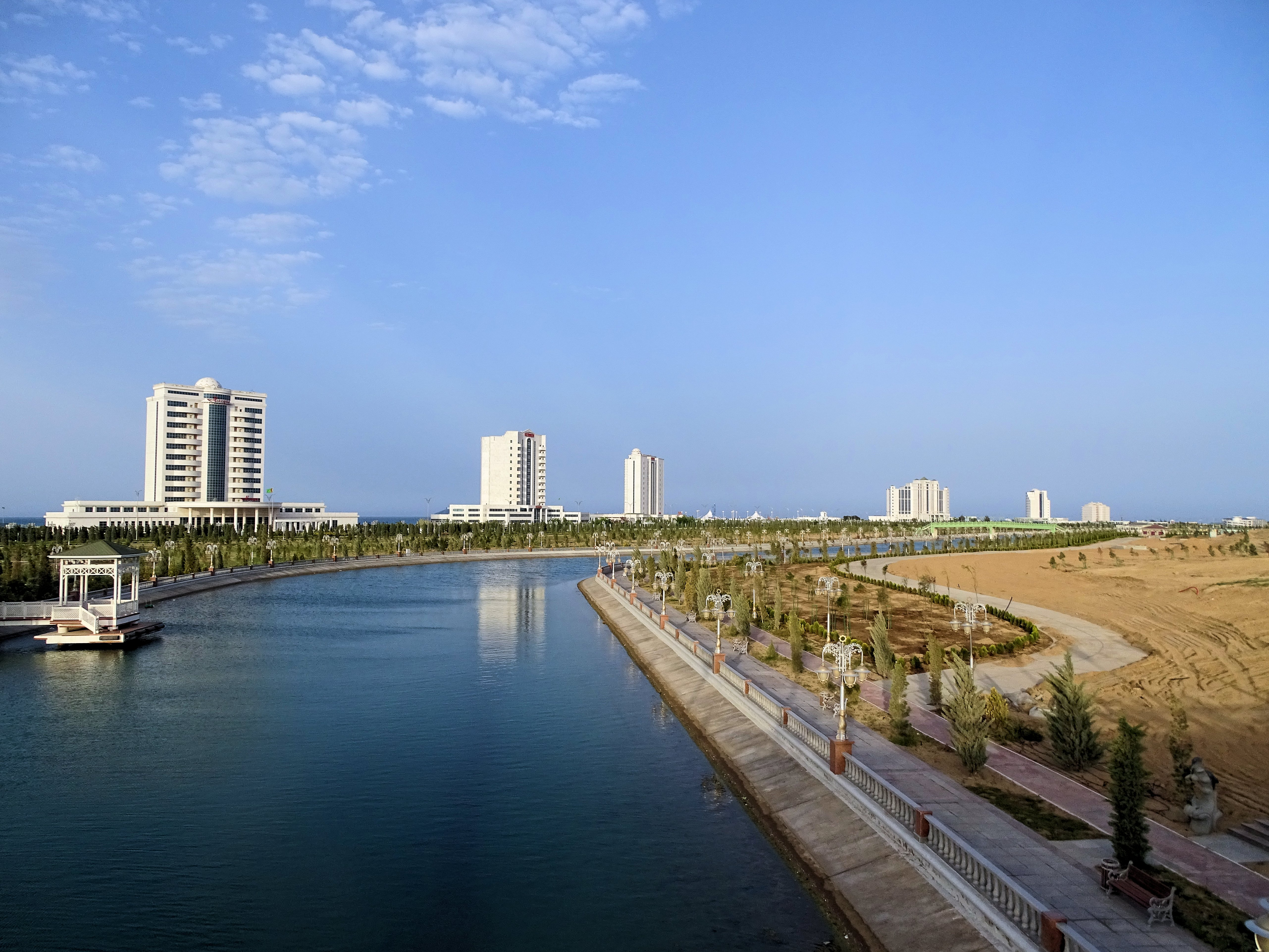
Hotels in Awaza

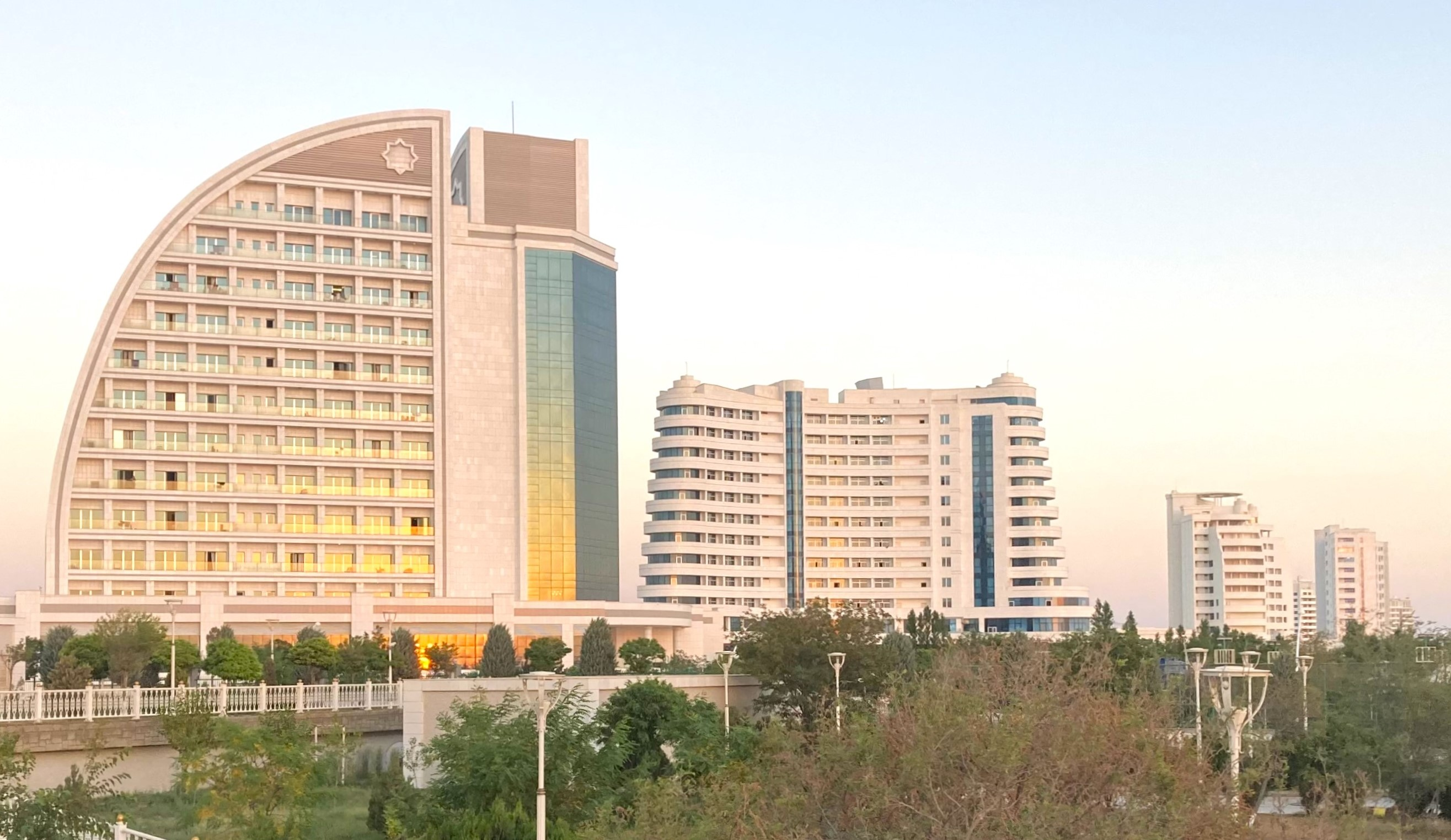
Awaza skyline

Awaza (or Avaza) refers to both a tourist zone in and a borough (district headed by a presidentially appointed mayor) of the city of Türkmenbaşy, Turkmenistan. It is located on the eastern shore of the Caspian Sea, 12 km west of downtown Türkmenbaşy. Awaza has grown from a small village to one of the largest resort destinations along the Caspian Sea coast.

The Awaza District (borough) of Türkmenbaşy city was formed in July 2013. Awaza District, an area of 9660 hectares, includes the Awaza national tourist zone, Turkmenbashi International Airport and a small residential area.

The tourist zone was commissioned by President Gurbanguly Berdimuhamedow, who sought to imitate Dubai's development boom. Turkmenistan's foreign ministry has touted Awaza as a "Turkmen Las Vegas" but foreign reports on the project have found that the accommodations are underutilized and hold little attraction apart from their sheer excess.

Awaza is also used as a conference site, particularly for the annual Turkmenistan Gas Conference.

== History ==
The Awaza National Tourist Zone was officially presented in June 2007. Covering 5,000 hectares, construction began later that year. In June 2009, a ceremony was held to inaugurate new buildings along the Caspian Sea coast within the Awaza.

In August 2025, Awaza hosted the 3rd United Nations Conference on Landlocked Developing Countries.

== Tourism ==
Awaza’s main summer industry is domestic tourism, supported by its hot, dry climate, long sandy beaches, and clear sea water, along with developed recreational and wellness facilities.

According to the Anadolu Agency, the Awaza receives about 150,000 guests annually.

== Transportation ==
Public transport is represented mainly by bus and taxi. From Awaza there are buses to the Turkmenbashi city, the Turkmenbashi airport and city Ashgabat.

Awaza is served by the Türkmenbaşy International Airport. Turkmenbashi Airport serves as a gateway to the tourists who visit this part of Turkmenistan every year. Turkmenistan Airlines offer daily flights to Turkmenistan's capital, Ashgabat. During the peak season, the number of flights reaches six per day. A new international airport terminal opened in 2010. The resort is connected by an international flight to Minsk, the capital of Belarus.

In 2010, a 22-kilometer motorway was opened, connecting Awaza with Türkmenbaşy International Airport. The Türkmenbaşy International Airport – Awaza motorway is designed for three lanes of traffic in both directions, with a 5-meter-wide median strip. It is equipped with modern road signs, parking bays, and an electronic traffic safety monitoring system. Convenient entrances and exits are provided at junctions, and terrain irregularities are overcome using two-level arched overpasses.

The Awaza River is 7 km long, 50–70 meters wide, and up to 4 meters deep. Both shores have 28 food service establishments. Small boats and tour boats operate on the river. Each of the many bridges features unique decorative designs.

== Health ==
The Avaza Sanatorium opened in July 2018, the nine-story facility accommodates 200 guests and is equipped with modern medical technology from various countries. The sanatorium offers treatments utilizing seawater and mineral water from a 600-meter-deep well. Available therapies include balneotherapy, mud therapy, physiotherapy, and thalassotherapy. These treatments are used to address a range of health conditions, including nervous system disorders, cardiovascular diseases, and respiratory issues. In addition to medical services, the sanatorium provides leisure facilities such as a spa, swimming pool, and a fitness bar. The "Avaza" Sanatorium operates year-round, offering both health and wellness programs.

== Accommodation ==
As of August 2025, Awaza has 18 hotels, 8 recreation and wellness centers (including children's facilities for 1,380 guests), and 9 cottage complexes, accommodating over 10,000 visitors at once.

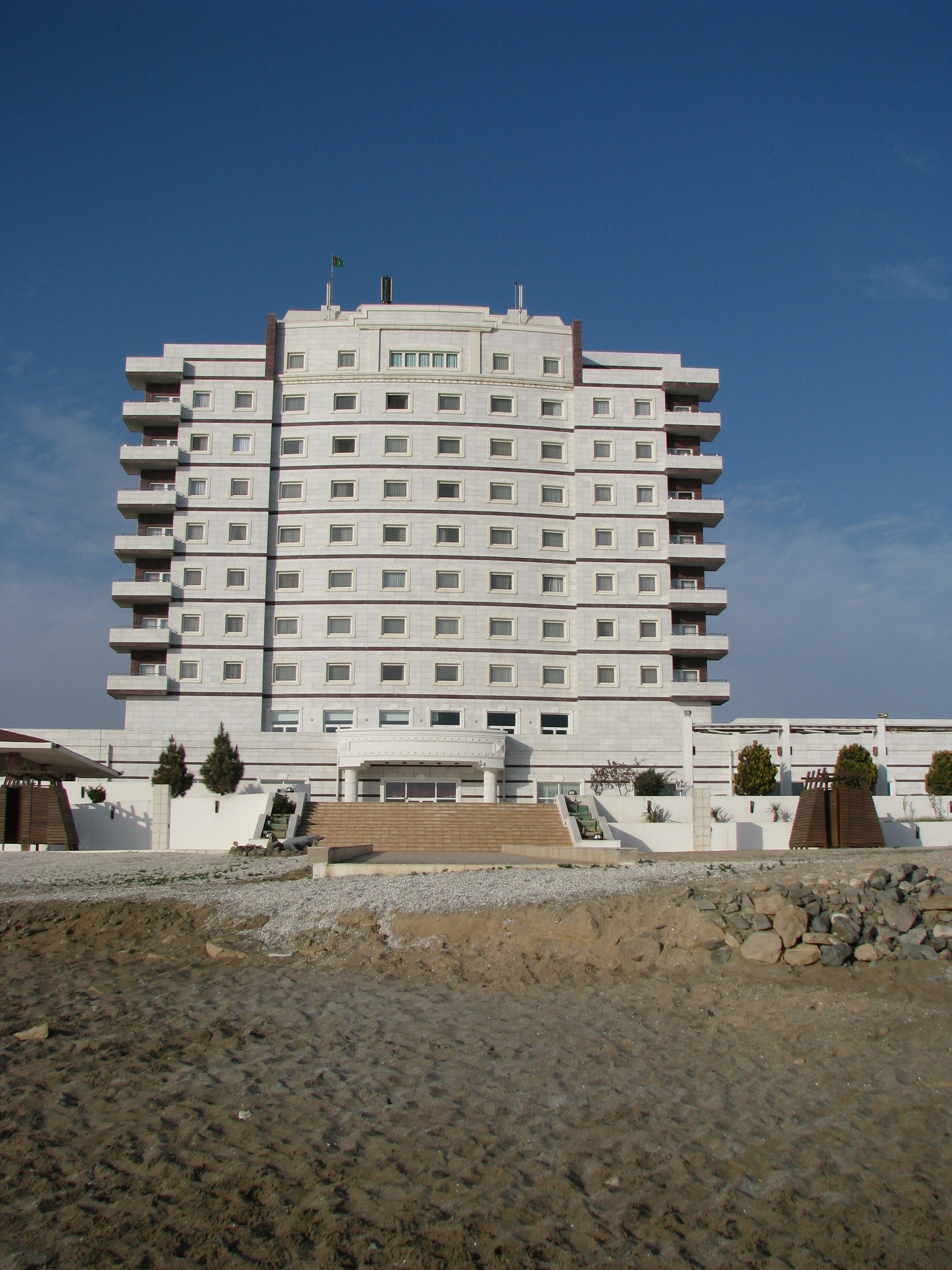
Hotel Serdar, the first hotel built in Awaza

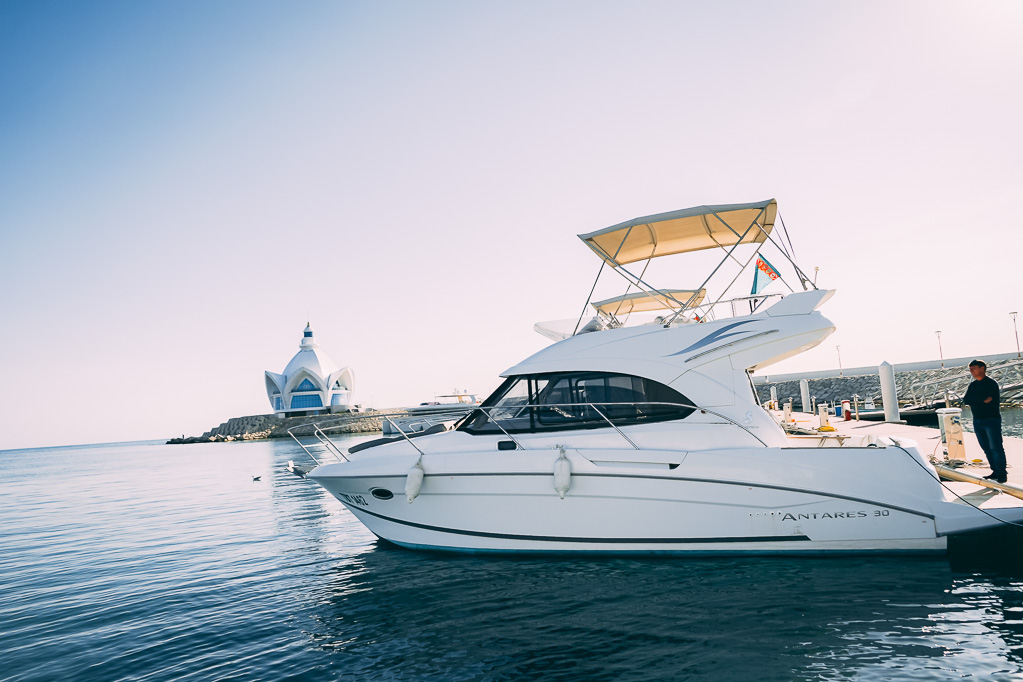
Motor yachts at Yacht Club Yelken, Awaza

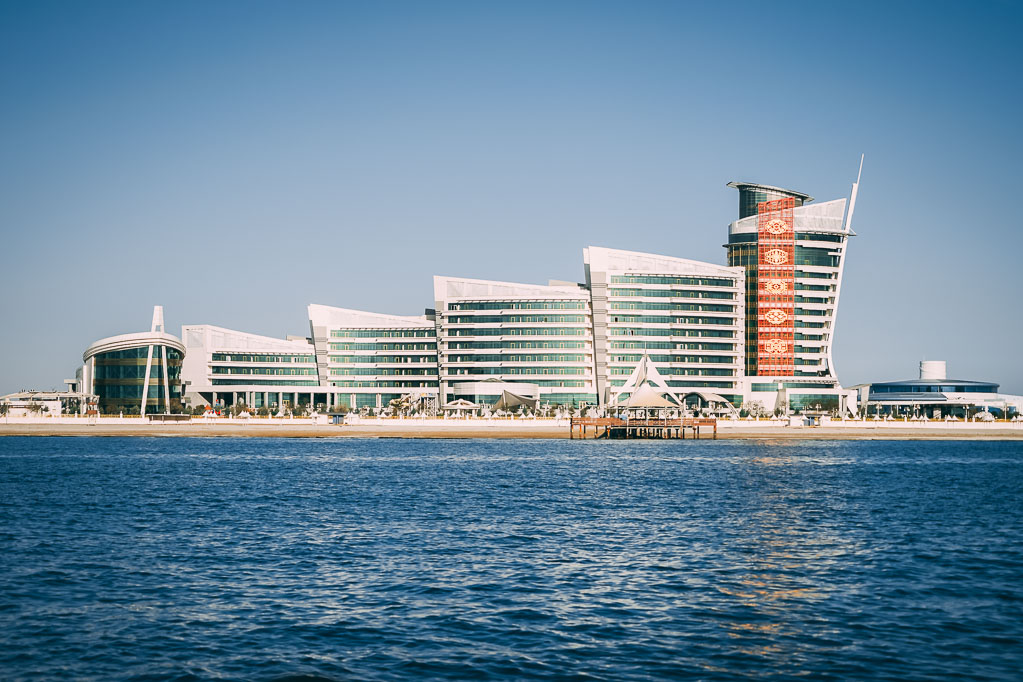
Bagtyýar Hotel in Awaza

Accommodation in Awaza
| Name | Year opened | Type |
|---|---|---|
| Awaza | 2018 | Sanatorium |
| Hazyna | 2009 | Hotel |
| Kerwen | 2009 | Hotel |
| Kuwwat | 2009 | Hotel |
| Watanchy | 2009 | Hotel |
| Nebitçi | 2009 | Hotel |
| Hasyl | 2013 | Hotel |
| Bereket | 2012 | Hotel |
| Serdar | 2001 | Hotel |
| Berkarar | 2013 | Hotel |
| Deňiz | 2013 | Hotel |
| Merdana | 2015 | Hotel |
| Täjir | 2013 | Hotel |
| Seýrana | 2013 | Hotel |
| Bagtyýar | 2015 | Hotel |
| Şamekan | 2015 | Hotel |
| Gämi | 2016 | Hotel |
| Hazar | 2015 | Hotel |
| Aşgabat | 2013 | Cottage complex |
| Şapak | 2012 | Cottage complex |
| Ýüpek ýoly | 2013 | Cottage complex |
| Galkynyş | 2013 | Cottage complex |
| Şowhun | 2013 | Cottage complex |
| Ak Ýelken | 2016 | Cottage complex |
| Rowaç | 2022 | Cottage complex |
| Arzuw | 2010 | Health center |
| Dayanç | 2010 | Health center |
| Ahal | 2013 | Health center |
| Balkan | 2013 | Health center |
| Daşoguz | 2013 | Health center |
| Lebap | 2013 | Health center |
| Mary | 2013 | Health center |
| Ýelken | 2013 | Yacht club |
| Tolkun | 2016 | Yacht club |

== Beaches and parks ==
There are 4 parks covering 83,600 m²; 2 have rides, interactive sea fountains, an amphitheater, playgrounds, cafes, restaurants, and green areas.

The Awaza Fountain Complex, located 85 meters from the shore, features 24-meter-high jets with holographic displays up to 20 meters tall, synchronized with music. A 34-meter viewing platform offers views of the sea and fountains.

In July 2018, a 30-hectare Awaza Aquapark was opened, including water attractions, shopping areas, cafes, an amphitheater, and artificial mountains, lakes, and waterfalls.

== Telecommunication ==
2G, 3G, LTE and 5G networks from Altyn Asyr are available in the tourist zone.

== Gallery ==
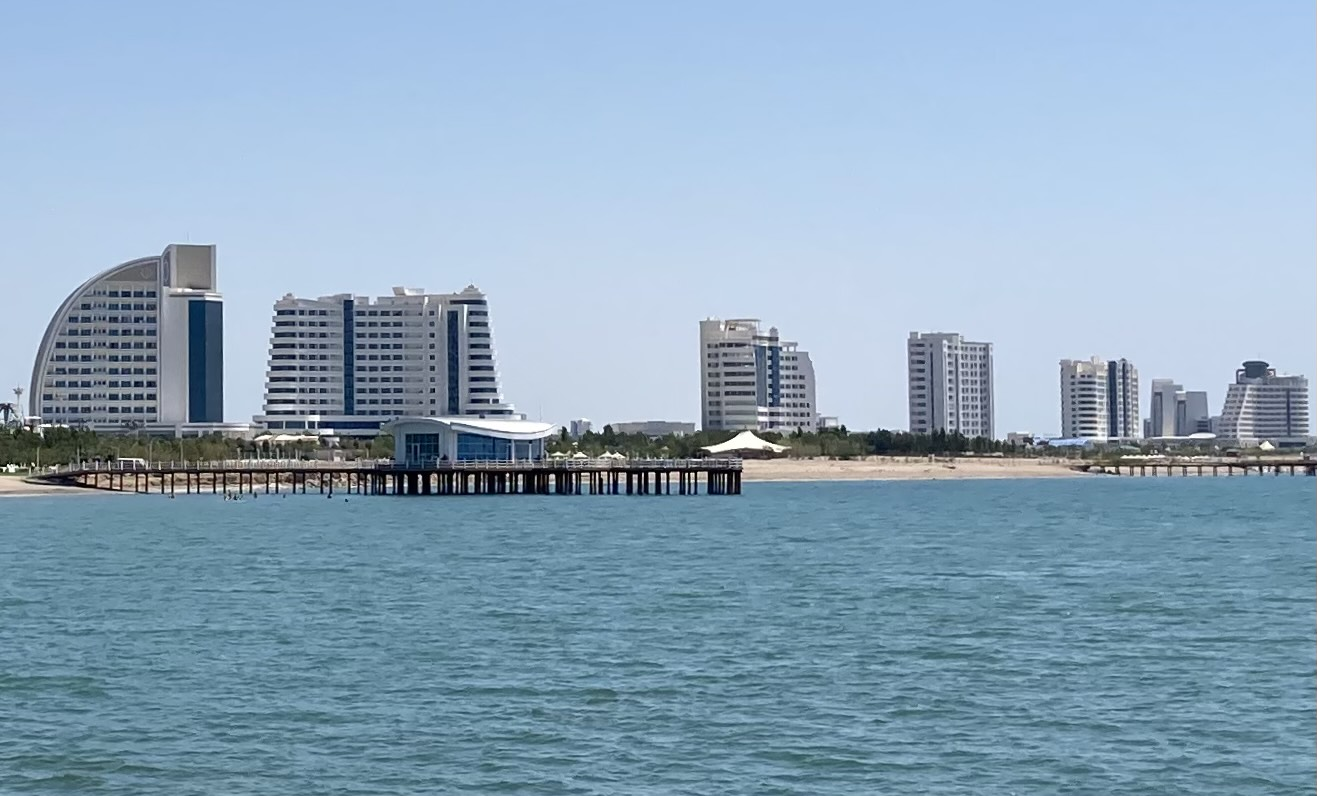
Hotels of Awaza

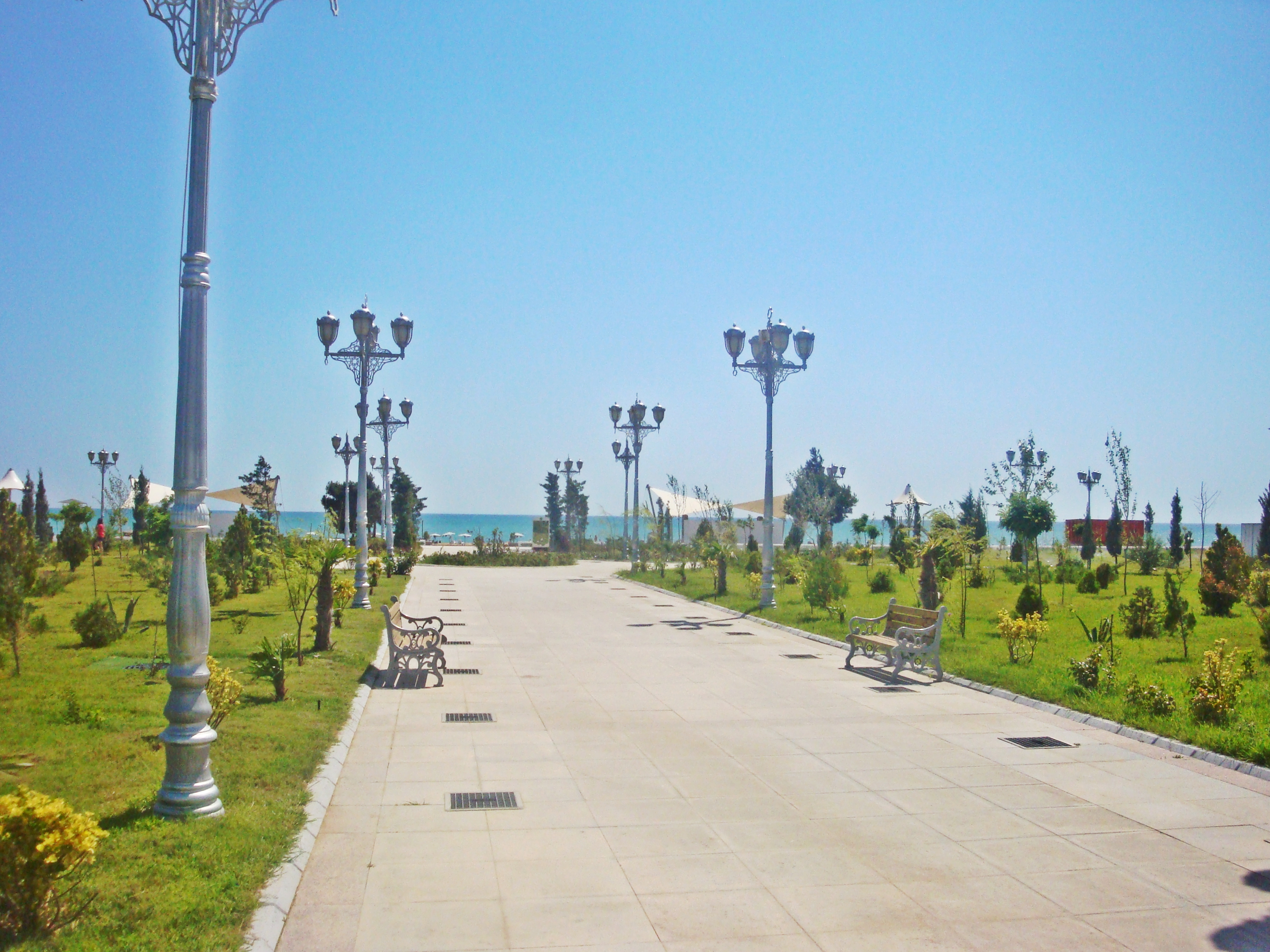
Coast

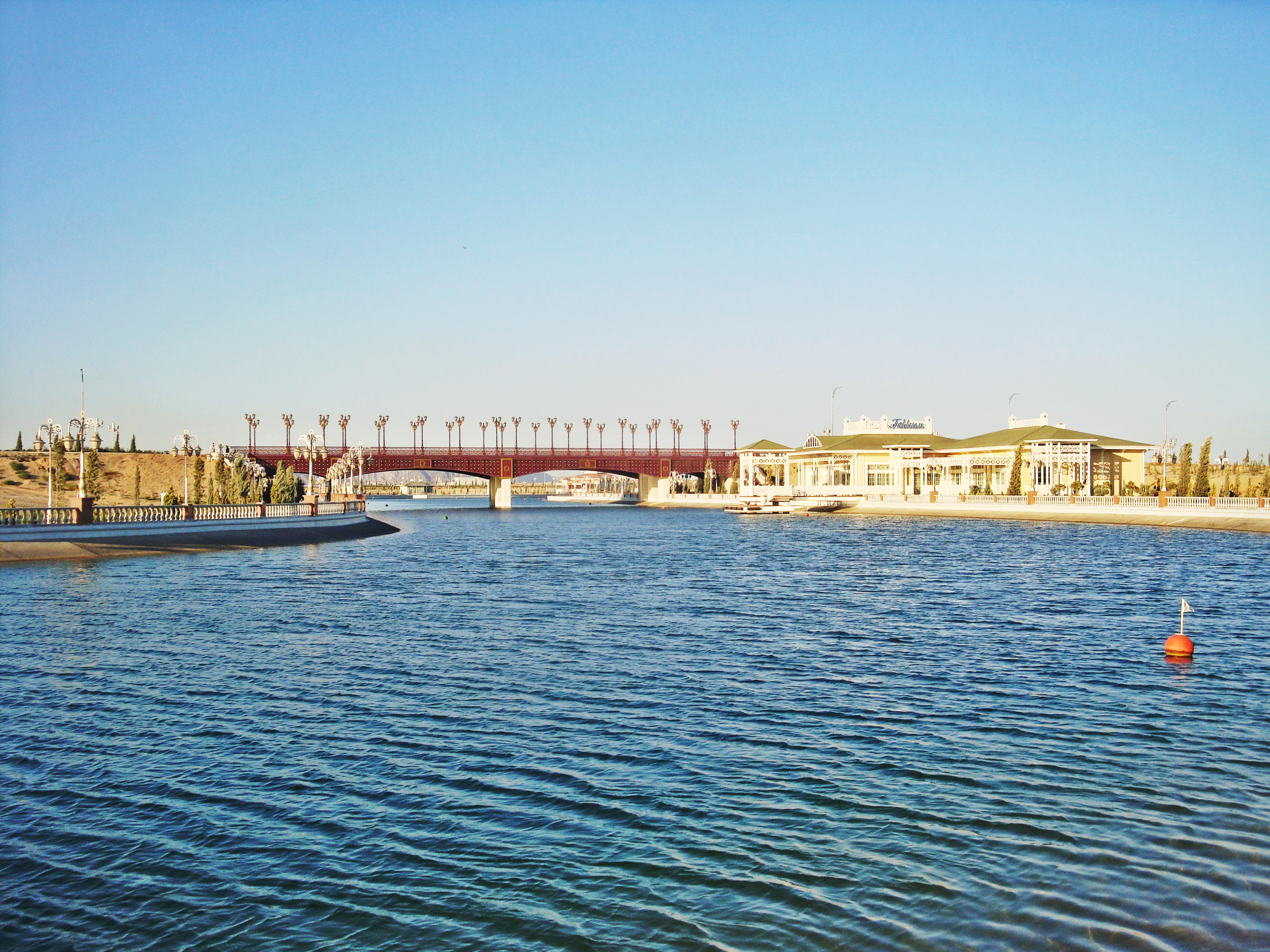
River

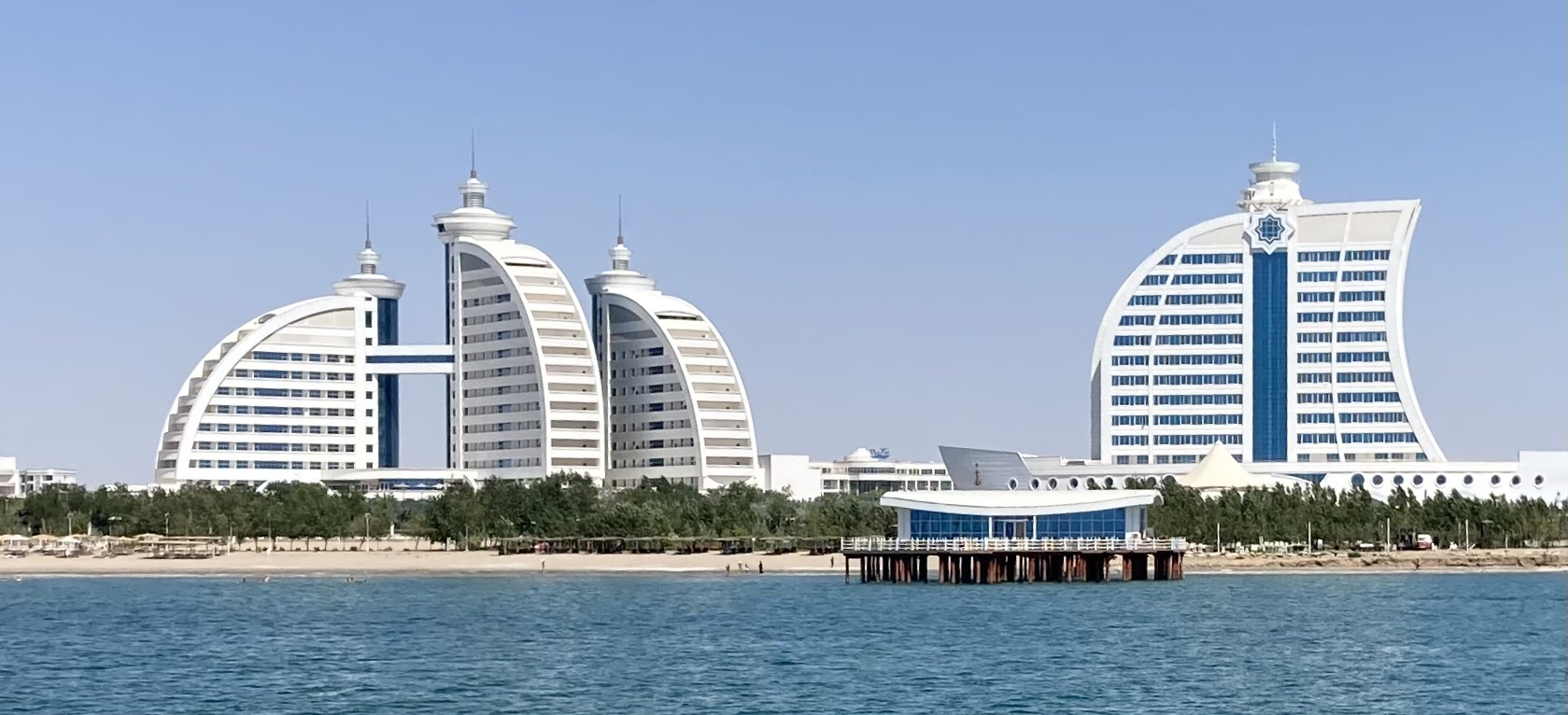
Hotels

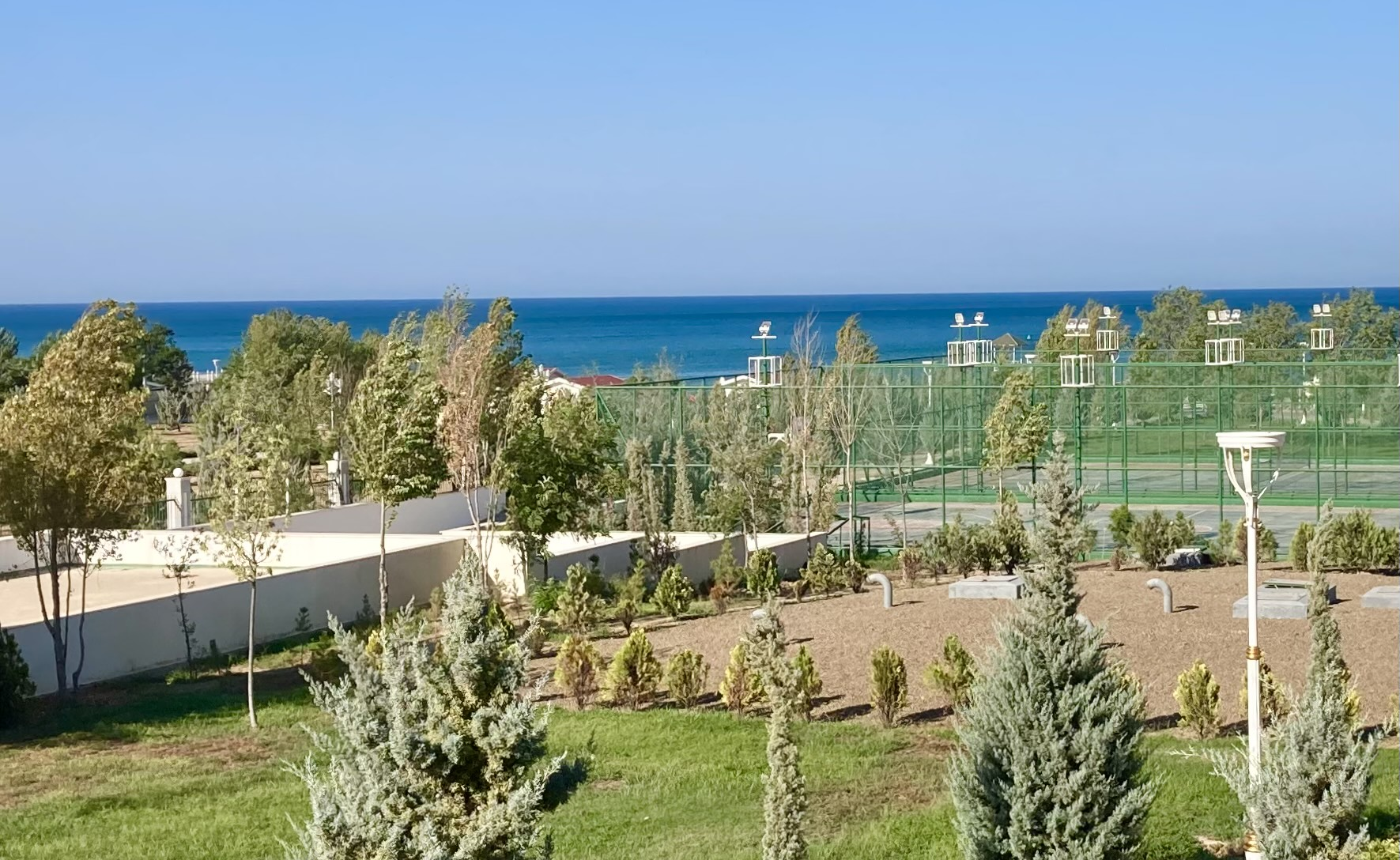
Caspian Sea View in Awaza

== See also ==
- Awaza Convention Center
- Districts of Turkmenistan
- Tourism in Turkmenistan
- Türkmenbaşy, Turkmenistan
- Yacht Club Yelken
