= Yacht Club Yelken =

Turkmen yacht club

Coordinates: 39°56′44″N 52°52′41″E

Yelken
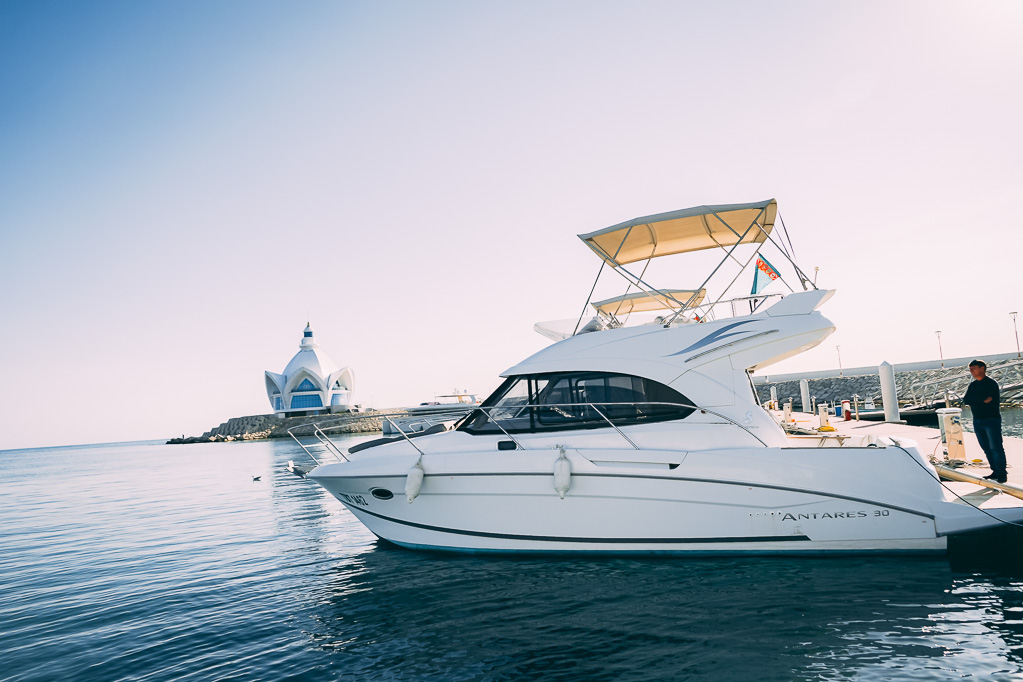
- Formation: 2013
- Legal status: active
- Purpose: advocate and public voice, educator and network for Recreational boating, and competitive sailors, coaches
- Location: Awaza, Turkmenistan
- Official language: English, Turkmen, Turkish, Russian
- Website: www.yelkenyahtkluby.com

The Yelken Yacht Club (Turkmen: Ýelken Ýaht Kluby) is a yacht club in Awaza, Turkmenistan. It is the first yacht club in Turkmenistan.

== History ==
Built by Turkish company Polimeks, construction began in 2009.

It was opened with the participation of President of Turkmenistan Gurbanguly Berdimuhamedov in June 2013.

In 2014, the yacht club held the PWA World Cup.
