= Landlocked developing countries =

Developing country without coastline

The landlocked developing countries (LLDC) are developing countries that are landlocked. Due to the economic and other disadvantages suffered by such countries, the majority of landlocked countries are least developed countries (LDCs), with inhabitants of these countries occupying the bottom billion tier of the world's population in terms of poverty. Outside of Europe, there is not a single highly developed landlocked country as measured by the Human Development Index (HDI), and nine of the twelve countries with the lowest HDI scores are landlocked. Landlocked European countries are exceptions in terms of development outcomes due to their close integration with the regional European market. Landlocked countries that rely on transoceanic trade usually suffer a cost of trade that is double that of their maritime neighbours. Landlocked countries experience 6% less economic growth than non-landlocked countries, holding other variables constant.

32 out of the world's 44 landlocked countries, including all the landlocked countries in Africa, Asia, and South America, have been classified as Landlocked Developing Countries by the United Nations. As of 2012, approximately 442.8 million people lived in these LDCs.

== UN-OHRLLS ==
The United Nations has an Office of the High Representative for the Least Developed Countries, Landlocked Developing Countries and Small Island Developing States (UN-OHRLLS). It mainly holds the view that high transport costs due to distance and terrain result in the erosion of competitive edge for exports from landlocked countries. In addition, it recognizes the constraints on landlocked countries to be mainly physical, including lack of direct access to the sea, isolation from world markets and high transit costs due to physical distance. It also attributes geographic remoteness as one of the most significant reasons why developing landlocked nations cannot alleviate themselves, while European landlocked cases are mostly developed because of short distances to the sea through well-developed countries. One other commonly cited factor is the administrative burdens associated with border crossings, as there is a heavy load of bureaucratic procedures, paperwork, custom charges, and most importantly, traffic delay due to border wait times, which affect delivery contracts. Delays and inefficiency compound geographically: thus a two- to three-week wait due to border customs between Uganda and Kenya makes it impossible to book ships ahead of time in Mombasa, furthering delivery contract delays. Despite these explanations, it is also important to consider the transit countries that neighbour LLDCs, from whose ports the goods of LLDCs are exported.

== Dependency problems ==
Although Adam Smith and traditional thought hold that geography and transportation are the culprits for keeping LLDCs from realizing development gains, Faye, Sachs and Snow hold the argument that no matter the advancement of infrastructure or lack of geographic distance to a port, landlocked nations are still dependent on their neighbouring transit nations. Outlying this specific relationship of dependency, Faye et al. insist that though LLDCs vary across the board in terms of HDI index scores, LLDCs almost uniformly straddle at the bottom of HDI rankings in terms of region, suggesting a correlated dependency relationship of development for landlocked countries with their respective regions. In fact, HDI levels decrease as one moves inland along the major transit route that runs from the coast of Kenya, across the country before going through Uganda, Rwanda and then finally Burundi. Just recently, it has been economically modeled that if the economic size of a transit country is increased by just 1%, a subsequent increase of at least 2% is experienced by the landlocked country, which shows that there is hope for LLDCs if the conditions of their transit neighbours are addressed. In fact, some LLDCs are seeing the brighter side of such a relationship, with the Central Asian nations geographic location between three BRICS nations (China, Russia and India) hungry for the region's oil and mineral wealth serving to boost economic development. The three major factors that LLDCs are dependent on their transit neighbours are dependence on transit infrastructure, dependence on political relations with neighbours, and dependence on internal peace and stability within transit neighbours.

=== Burundi ===
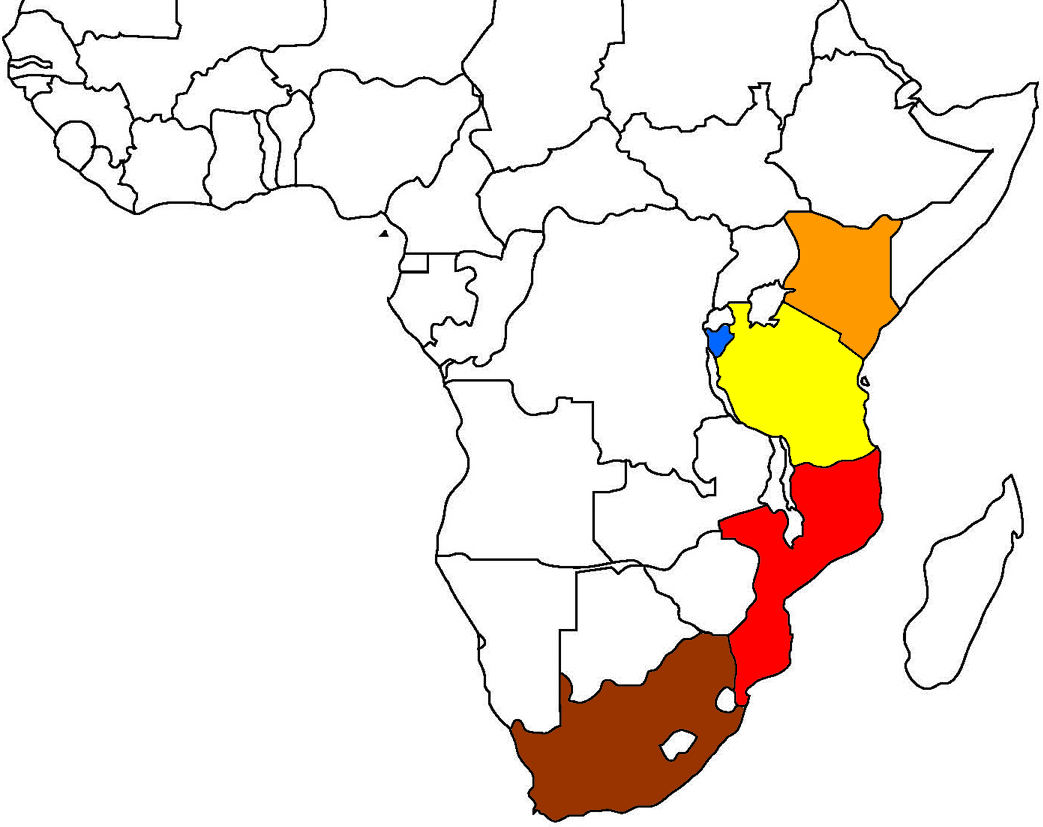
Burundi is shown in blue. Its possible export routes were either dependent on infrastructure of transit neighbour Tanzania (yellow), or dependent on political relations with transit neighbour Kenya (orange), or dependent on internal stability of transit neighbour Mozambique (red). When all three routes were unavailable, Burundi had to rely on the port of Durban in South Africa (brown).

Burundi has relatively good internal road networks, but it cannot export its goods using the most direct route to the sea since the inland infrastructure of Tanzania is poorly connected to the port of Dar es Salaam. Thus Burundi relies on Kenya's port of Mombasa for export; but this route was severed briefly in the 1990s when political relations with Kenya deteriorated. Further, Burundi's exports could not pass through Mozambique around the same time due to the Mozambican Civil War (1977–1992). Thus, Burundi had to export its goods using a 4500 km route, crossing several borders and changing transport modes, to reach the port of Durban in South Africa.

=== Other African countries ===
- Mali had problems exporting goods in the 1990s as nearly all its transit neighbours (Algeria, Togo, Sierra Leone, Liberia, Guinea and Côte d'Ivoire) were engaged in civil war around the same time: the Algerian civil war (1991–2002), the Sierra Leone civil war (1991–2002), the Guinea-Bissau civil war involving Guinea (1999), the First Liberian Civil War (1989–1997), the Second Liberian Civil War (1999) and the First Ivorian Civil War (2002–2007). The lone exception was Ghana, which was under military rule but did not have an active civil war at the time.
- The Central African Republic's export routes are seasonal: in the rainy season Cameroon's roads are too poor to use; and during the dry season the Democratic Republic of Congo's Oubangui River water levels are too low for river travel.

=== Central Asia ===
The mineral resource-rich countries of Central Asia and Mongolia offer a unique set of landlocked cases, as these are nations where economic growth has grown exceptionally in recent years. In Central Asia, oil and coal deposits have influenced development: Kazakhstan’s GDI per capita in purchasing power parity was five times greater than Kyrgyzstan's in 2009. Despite substantial development growth, these nations are not on a stable and destined path to being well developed, as the exploitation of their natural resources translates into an overall low average income and disparity of income, and because their limited deposits of resources allow growth only in the short term, and most importantly because dependence on unprocessed materials increases the risk of shocks due to variations in market prices. And though it is widely conceived that free trade can permit faster economic growth, Mongolia is now subjected to a new geopolitical game which concerns the traffic on its railway lines between China and Russia. Russian Railways now effectively owns 50% of Mongolia's rail infrastructure, which could mean more efficient modernization and the laying of new rail lines, but in reality also translates into powerful leverage to pressure the government of Mongolia to concede unfair terms for license grants of coal, copper, and gold mines. Thus, it can be argued that these nations with extraordinary mineral wealth should pursue economic diversification. All of these nations possess education qualifications, as they are inheritors of the Soviet Union's social education system. This implies that it is due to poor economic policies that more than 40% of the labour force is bogged down in the agricultural sector instead of being diverted into secondary or tertiary economic activity. However, Mongolia benefits exceptionally from its proximity to the large economies of Russia and China, resulting in a rapid development of railway ports along its borders, especially along the Chinese border, as the Chinese seek to direct coking coal from Mongolia to China's northwestern industrial core, and, as well as for transportation southeast towards Japan and South Korea, resulting in revenue generation through the seaport of Tianjin.

=== Armenia ===
The Republic of Armenia is a landlocked country with geographic disadvantages, and faces limitations on foreign policy options. It needs to transport its goods via coastal neighbors to access ports to participate in international trade, to which Azerbaijan and Turkey are hostile and deny its access. Therefore, Armenia mainly depends on the Georgian ports of Batumi and Poti and the Georgian railway system to participate in international trade. Armenia also shares a short border with neighboring Iran, through which it trades despite American sanctions. Armenia remains heavily dependent on imports from Russia and exports of moderately unsophisticated goods to Russia. While Russia remained Armenia's dominant trade partner, trade with the EU in 2020 accounted for around 18% of Armenia's total trade. As of 2020, the European Union is Armenia's third-biggest export market, with a 17% share of total Armenian exports, and the second largest source of Armenian imports, with an 18.6% share in total Armenian imports.

=== Nepal ===
Nepal is a landlocked country with extreme dependency on its transit neighbour India. India does not have poor relations with Nepal, nor does it lack relevant transport infrastructure or internal stability. However, there have been two cases of economic blockades imposed by the government of India on Nepal – the official 1989 blockade and the unofficial 2015 blockade – both of which left the nation in severe economic crisis. In the 1970s, Nepal suffered from large commodity concentration and a high geographic centralization in its export trade: over 98% of its exports were to India, and 90% of its imports came from India. As a result of all this, Nepal had a poor trade bargaining position. In the 1950s, Nepal was forced to comply with India's external tariffs as well as the prices of India's exports. This was problematic since the two countries have different levels of development, resulting in greater gains for India which was larger, more advanced and with more resources. It was feared that a parasitic relationship might emerge, since India had a head start in industrialization, and dominated Nepal in manufacturing, which could reduce Nepal to being just a supplier of raw materials. Because of these problems, and Nepal's inability to develop its own infant industries (as it could not compete with Indian manufactures) treaties were drafted in 1960 and 1971, with amendments to the equal tariffs conditions, and terms of trade have since progressed.

== Almaty Ministerial Conference ==
In August, 2003, the International Ministerial Conference of Landlocked and Transit Developing Countries and Donor Countries on Transit Transport Cooperation (Almaty Ministerial Conference) was held in Almaty, Kazakhstan, setting the necessities of LLDCs in a universal document whereas there were no coordinated efforts on the global scale to serve the unique needs of LLDCs in the past. Other than acknowledging the main forms of dependency that must be addressed, it also acknowledged the additional dependency issue where neighbouring transit countries are often observed to export the same products as their landlocked neighbours. One result of the conference was a direct call for donor countries to step in to direct aid into setting up suitable infrastructure of transit countries to alleviate the burden of supporting LLDCs in regions of poor development in general. The general objectives of the Almaty Program of Action is as follows:

- Reduce customs processes and fees to minimize costs and transport delays
- Improve infrastructure with respect to existing preferences of local transport modes, where road should be focused in Africa and rail in South Asia
- Implement preferences for landlocked countries’ commodities to boost their competitiveness in the international market
- To establish relationships between donor countries with landlocked and transit countries for technical, financial and policy improvements

== Third UN Conference on Landlocked Developing Countries ==
In August 2025, the third UN Conference on Landlocked Developing Countries (LLDC3) was held in Awaza, Turkmenistan, with the agenda to strengthen transit, trade corridors, economic resilience and financing for landlocked developing countries.

The Conference was postponed twice, having been originally scheduled to be held in August 2024 in Rwanda, and December 2024 in Gaborone, Botswana.

The Programme of Action for Landlocked Developing Countries for the Decade 2024-2034 (renamed Awan Programme of Action) was adotped by the General Assmelby in December 2024. The Programme of Action identifies five priorities: promoting sustainable economic growth through innovation and structural transformation, enhancing regional trade integration, improving transport connectivity, building climate resilience, and ensuring effective implementation strategies.

== Current LLDCs ==
Map of current landlocked developing countries

Africa (16 countries)

- Botswana
- Burkina Faso
- Burundi
- Central African Republic
- Chad
- Eswatini
- Ethiopia
- Lesotho
- Malawi
- Mali
- Niger
- Rwanda
- South Sudan
- Uganda
- Zambia
- Zimbabwe

Asia (12 countries)

- Afghanistan
- Armenia
- Azerbaijan
- Bhutan
- Kazakhstan
- Kyrgyzstan
- Laos
- Mongolia
- Nepal
- Tajikistan
- Turkmenistan
- Uzbekistan

Europe (2 countries)

- Moldova
- North Macedonia

South America (2 countries)

- Bolivia
- Paraguay

== See also ==
- Small Island Developing States
