= International trade =

Exchange across international borders

International trade is the exchange of capital, goods, and services across international borders or territories because there is a need or demand for goods or services.

It involves the movement of commodities, such as natural resources and manufactured goods, and the transfer of services, such as personal and commercial data, banking and financial transactions, and other professional and business-related activities. These activities are important because they link local, regional, and national economies with the global economy. In doing so, they facilitate the international diffusion and exchange of ideas and information, culture, technology, social and political institutions, managerial know-how, business cycles, and capital investment funds.

To ease and justify the process of trade between countries of different economic standing in the modern era, some international economic organizations were formed, such as the World Trade Organization. These organizations work towards the facilitation and growth of international trade. Statistical services of intergovernmental and supranational organizations and governmental statistical agencies publish official statistics on international trade.

== Characteristics of global trade ==
A product that is transferred or sold from a party in one country to a party in another country is an export from the originating country, and an import to the country receiving that product. Imports and exports are accounted for in a country's current account in the balance of payments.

Trading globally may give consumers and countries the opportunity to be exposed to new markets and products. Almost every kind of product can be found in the international market, for example: food, clothes, spare parts, oil, jewellery, wine, stocks, currencies, and water. Services are also traded, such as in tourism, banking, consulting, and transportation.

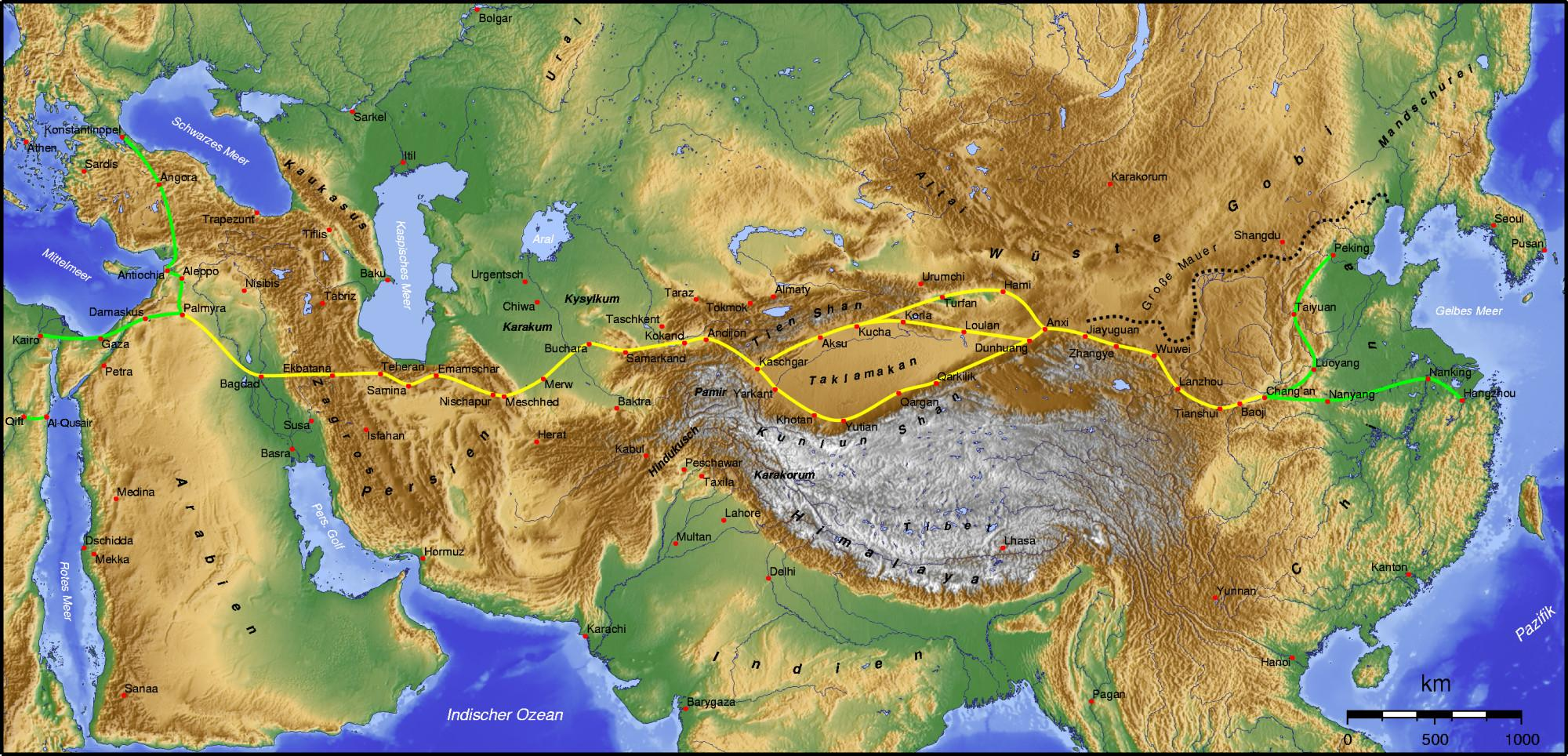
The ancient Silk Road trade routes across Eurasia

Advanced technology (including transportation), globalization, industrialization, outsourcing and multinational corporations have major impacts on the international trade systems. E-commerce has facilitated international trade by enabling businesses to reach customers in foreign markets through online marketplaces. In the United States, Amazon provides small and medium-sized enterprises with access to international customers through its marketplace and fulfilment services. In China, e-commerce connects businesses with international buyers through its online marketplaces and cross-border trade services. These platforms can reduce the costs of finding buyers, processing payments and arranging international shipments, making it easier for smaller businesses to participate in international trade.

== Differences from domestic trade ==
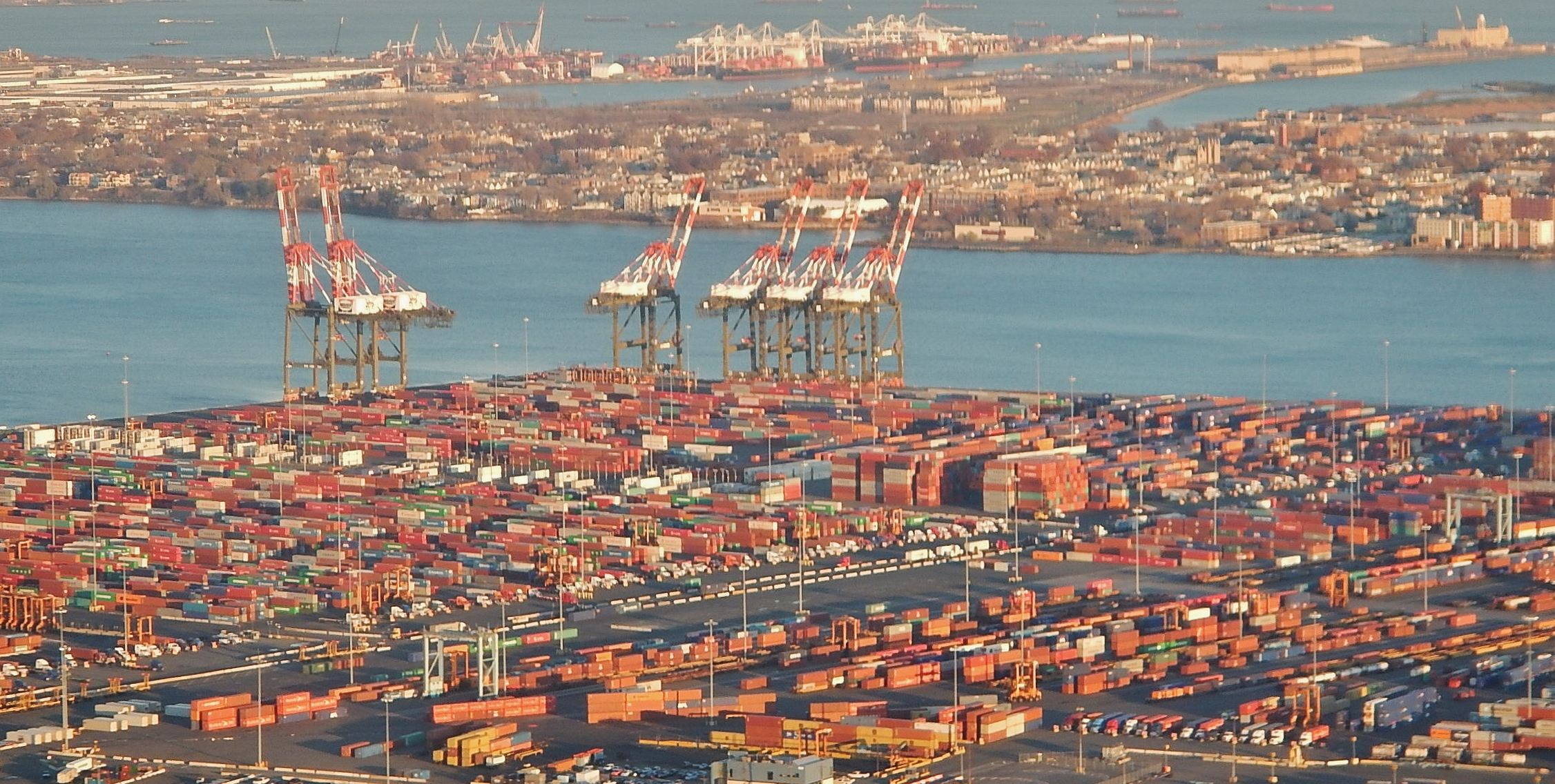
Ports play an important role in facilitating international trade. The Port of New York and New Jersey grew from the original harbor at the convergence of the Hudson River and the East River at the Upper New York Bay.

International trade is, not different from domestic trade as the motivation and the behavior of parties involved in a trade do not change fundamentally regardless of whether trade is across a border or not.

However, in practical terms, It carrying out trade at an international level is typically a more complex process than domestic trade. The main difference is that international trade is typically more costly than domestic trade. This is due to the fact that cross-border trade typically incurs additional costs such as explicit tariffs as well as explicit or implicit cost non-tariff barriers such as time costs (due to border delays), language and cultural differences, product safety, the legal system, and so on.

Another difference between domestic and international trade is that factors of production such as capital and labor are often more mobile within a country than across countries. Thus, international trade is mostly restricted to trade in goods and services, and only to a lesser extent to trade in capital, labour, or other factors of production. Trade in goods and services can serve as a substitute for trade in factors of production. Instead of importing a factor of production, a country can import goods that make intensive use of that factor of production and thus embody it. An example of this is the import of labor-intensive goods by the United States from China. Instead of importing Chinese labor, the United States imports goods that were produced with Chinese labor. One report in 2010, suggested that international trade was increased when a country hosted a network of immigrants, but the trade effect was weakened when the immigrants became assimilated into their new country.

International trade can involve higher upfront costs than domestic trade. Entering a foreign market typically requires investments in market research, product customization and the development of distribution networks. Continuing to export can also involve costs, including maintaining distribution networks and updating products. Limited access to external finance can prevent firms with insufficient internal funds from undertaking these export-specific expenditures. International trade transactions are also subject to variable trade costs, such as shipping expenses, duties and freight insurance. By reducing profits from foreign sales, these costs can limit firms' ability to overcome financial constraints affecting their export decisions.

== History ==
The history of trade is related to humanity's development. The earliest evidence of trade dates back to the Neolithic period, between 7,000 and 3,000 BC, when humans began to establish permanent settlements rather than live as nomads. During this period, people developed skills in agriculture, writing, livestock raising, animal domestication, and iron metallurgy, among other activities. The emergence of surplus goods led to the exchange of items through barter, laying the foundations for trade. At that time, currencies did not yet exist, and different regions of the world used certain goods as means of exchange, including copper, silver, barley, iron bars, rice, and other metals.

Until the Second World War, trade relations were generally conducted through bilateral agreements, with countries frequently adopting protectionist and isolationist policies. Taxes and trade barriers were commonly imposed on imports and exports to protect domestic interests.

In 1944, representatives of industrialized countries met in Bretton Woods, New Hampshire, to discuss economic issues that had contributed to international conflicts. During this period, globalisation and the expansion of industrialised economies accelerated, with companies increasingly establishing operations in developing countries to access emerging consumer markets and sources of low-cost raw materials. The conference resulted in the establishment of the International Monetary Fund (IMF) and the World Bank, but did not create an organisation dedicated to promoting international trade cooperation.

In 1947, the General Agreement on Tariffs and Trade (GATT) was established to strengthen international trade relations and reduce trade barriers. Over the following 48 years, GATT played an important role in the development of institutional trade relations, the reduction of international tariffs, and the expansion of international trade.

== Theories and models ==
There are several models that seek to explain the factors behind international trade, the welfare consequences of trade and the pattern of trade.

== Most traded export products ==
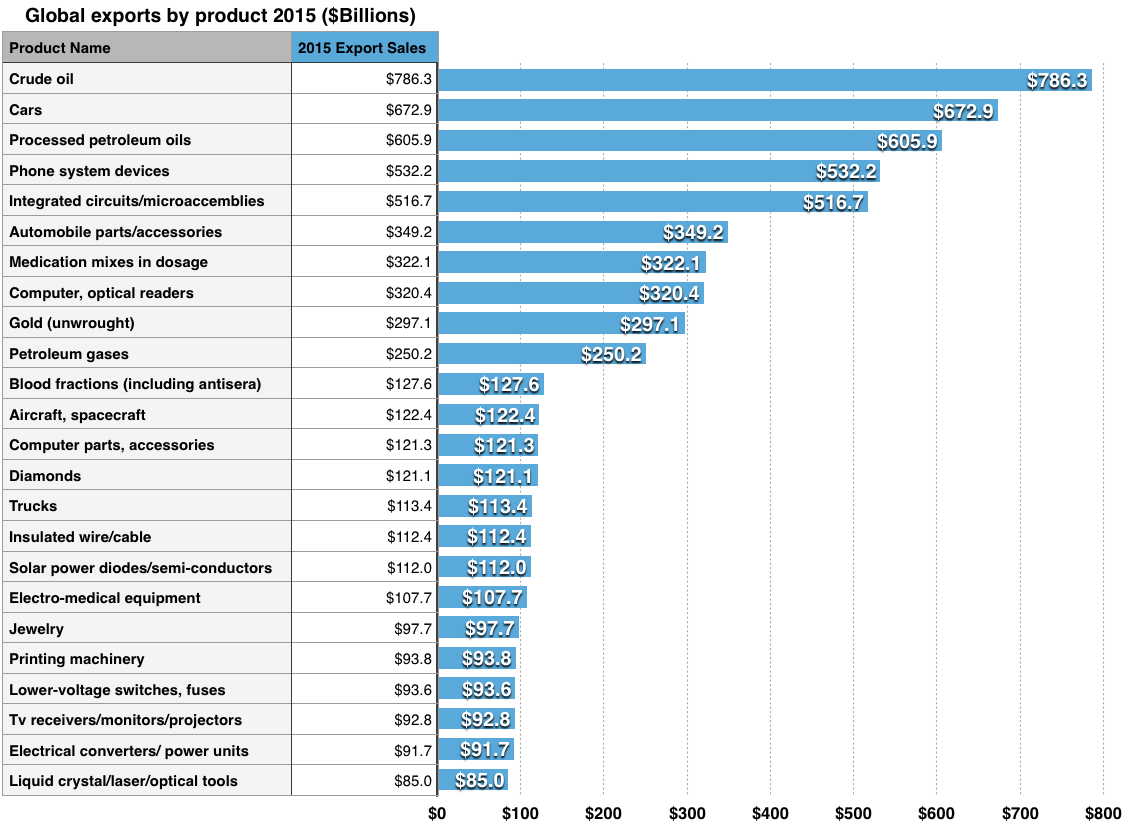

== Largest countries or regions by total international trade ==
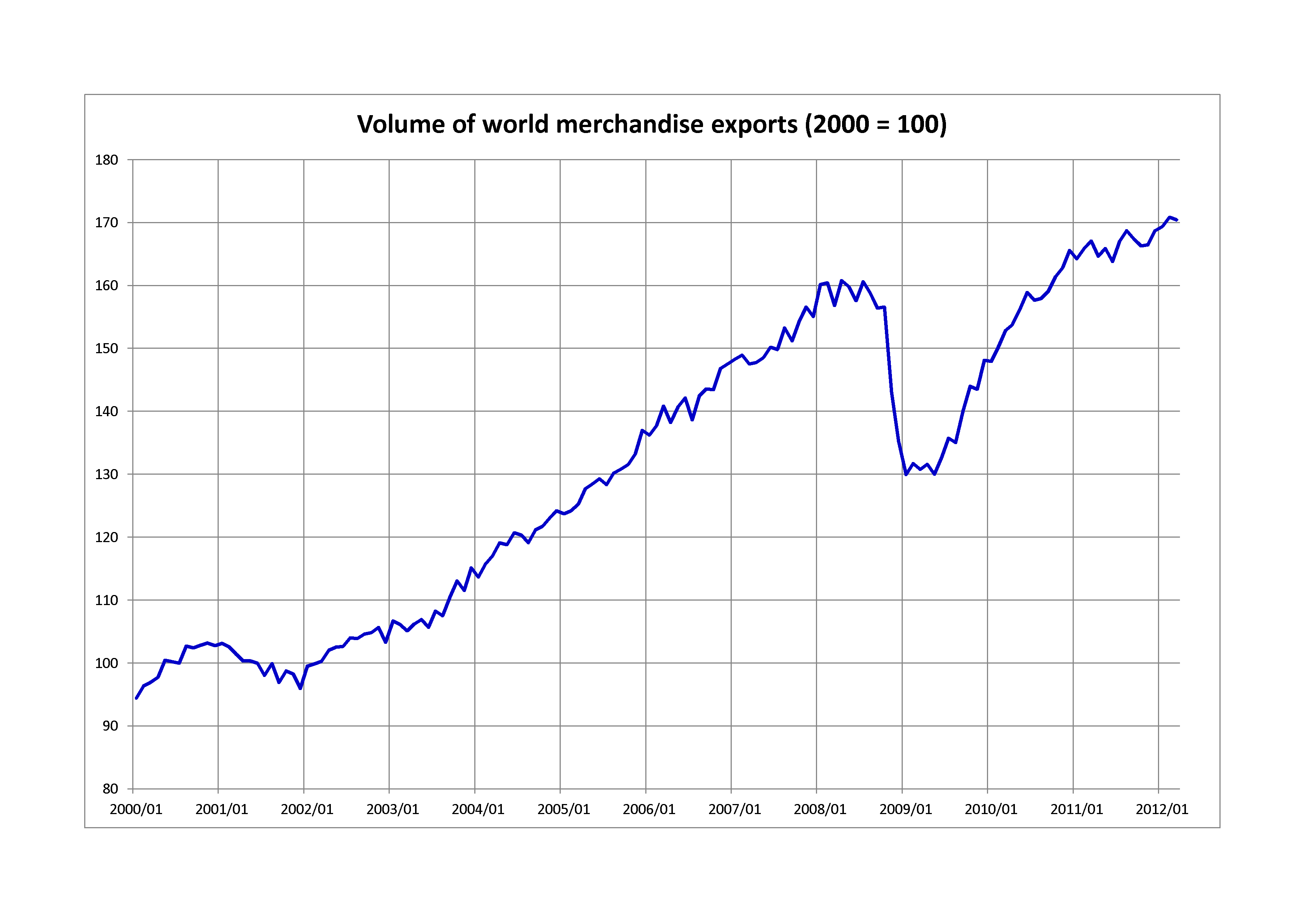
Volume of world merchandise exports

The following table is a list of the 30 largest trading states according to the World Trade Organization in 2025.

International trade (billions of USD)
| Rank | State | Merchandise | Commercial Services | Digitally Delivered Services | Total |
|---|---|---|---|---|---|
| – | World | 52,865 | 18,243 | 9,625 | 80,733 |
| – | European Union | 5,820 | 3,369 | | 9,189 |
| 1 | United States | 5,692 | 2,079 | 1,305 | 9,076 |
| 2 | China | 6,355 | 1,130 | 411 | 7,896 |
| 3 | Germany | 3,307 | 1,090 | 605 | 5,002 |
| 4 | United Kingdom | 1,505 | 1,173 | 816 | 3,494 |
| 5 | Netherlands | 1,859 | 720 | 445 | 3,024 |
| 6 | France | 1,469 | 783 | 402 | 2,654 |
| 7 | India | 1,198 | 692 | 453 | 2,343 |
| 8 | Ireland | 293 | 1,102 | 929 | 2,324 |
| 9 | Singapore | 1,073 | 807 | 440 | 2,320 |
| 10 | Japan | 1,494 | 503 | 305 | 2,302 |
| 11 | Italy | 1,395 | 342 | 159 | 1,896 |
| 12 | Hong Kong | 1,586 | 211 | 84 | 1,881 |
| 13 | South Korea | 1,341 | 332 | 164 | 1,837 |
| 14 | Switzerland | 1,061 | 401 | 282 | 1,744 |
| 15 | United Arab Emirates | 1,326 | 311 | 33 | 1,670 |
| 16 | Canada | 1,132 | 339 | 183 | 1,654 |
| 17 | Belgium | 1,106 | 331 | 196 | 1,633 |
| 18 | Mexico | 1,348 | 139 | 34 | 1,521 |
| 19 | Spain | 958 | 378 | 159 | 1,495 |
| 20 | Taiwan | 1,135 | 141 | 63 | 1,339 |
| 21 | Poland | 835 | 212 | 106 | 1,153 |
| 22 | Vietnam | 927 | 70 | | 997 |
| 23 | Australia | 649 | 205 | 70 | 924 |
| 24 | Brazil | 642 | 153 | 80 | 875 |
| 25 | Thailand | 685 | 153 | 35 | 873 |
| 26 | Russia | 722 | 139 | | 861 |
| 27 | Malaysia | 716 | 128 | | 844 |
| 28 | Turkey | 638 | 180 | | 818 |
| 29 | Saudi Arabia | 565 | 191 | 33 | 789 |
| 30 | Indonesia | 525 | 106 | 31 | 662 |

== Top traded commodities by value (exports) ==
Traded commodities in 2022
| Rank | Commodity | Value in US$ (millions) | Date of information |
|---|---|---|---|
| 1 | Mineral fuels, oils, distillation products | 3,988,389 | 2022 |
| 2 | Electrical, electronic equipment | 3,493,553 | 2022 |
| 3 | Machinery, nuclear reactors, boilers, etc. | 2,573,572 | 2022 |
| 4 | Vehicles (excluding railway) | 1,621,658 | 2022 |
| 5 | Pharmaceutical products | 875,345 | 2022 |
| 6 | Pearls, precious stones, metals, coins, etc. | 866,839 | 2022 |
| 7 | Plastics and articles thereof | 815,554 | 2022 |
| 8 | Optical, photo, technical, medical, etc. apparatus | 669,128 | 2022 |
| 9 | Iron and steel | 564,547 | 2022 |
| 10 | Organic chemicals | 537,854 | 2022 |

Source: International Trade Centre

== Observances ==
In the US, starting in 1935, the various U.S. presidents have held "World Trade Week" observances to promote large and small companies to be more involved with the export and import of goods and services. This tradition was preceded by a local observance of "Foreign Trade Week" by the Los Angeles Area Chamber of Commerce that originated in 1927 as an expansion of United States National Maritime Day.

Every year the President declares the third week of May to be World Trade Week.

- President George W. Bush observed World Trade Week on May 18, 2001 and May 17, 2002.
- On May 13, 2016, President Barack Obama proclaimed May 15–21, 2016 as World Trade Week.
- On May 19, 2017, President Donald Trump proclaimed May 21–27, 2017 as World Trade Week.

== International trade vs local production ==
=== Food security ===
Net food trade as a share of domestic supply

Overview of global cereal trade networks, 2020.

Global trade networks for aggregate food and agriculture, wheat, maize and rice distribution of trade connectivity across countries.

The trade-offs between local food production and distant food production are controversial, with limited studies comparing environmental impact and scientists cautioning that regionally specific environmental impacts should be considered. A 2020 study indicated that local food crop production alone cannot meet the demand for most food crops with "current production and consumption patterns" and the locations of food production at the time of the study for 72–89% of the global population and 100 km radiuses as of early 2020. Studies found that food miles are a relatively minor contributor to carbon emissions, although increased food localization may also provide additional environmental benefits, such as the recycling of energy, water and nutrients. For certain foods, regional differences in harvest seasons may make importing from distant regions more environmentally friendly than local production and storage or production in greenhouses.

=== Qualitative differences and economic aspects ===
Qualitative differences between substitutive products of different production regions may exist due to different legal requirements and quality standards or different levels of controllability by local production- and governance-systems which may have aspects of security beyond resource security, environmental protection, product quality and product design and health. The process of transforming supply as well as labor rights may differ as well.

Local production has been reported to increase local employment in many cases. A 2018 study claimed that international trade can increase local employment. A 2016 study found that local employment and total labor income in both manufacturing and nonmanufacturing were negatively affected by rising exposure to imports.

Local production in high-income countries, rather than distant regions may require higher wages for workers. Higher wages incentivize automation which could allow for automated workers' time to be reallocated by society and its economic mechanisms or be converted into leisure-like time.

==== Specialization, production efficiency and regional differences ====
Local production may require knowledge transfer, technology transfer and may not be able to compete in efficiency initially with specialized, established industries and businesses, or in consumer demand without policy measures such as eco-tariffs. Regional differences may cause specific regions to be more suitable for a specific production, thereby increasing the advantages of specific trade over specific local production. Forms of local products that are highly localized may not be able to meet the efficiency of more large-scale, highly consolidated production in terms of efficiency, including environmental impact.

=== Resource security ===
A video explaining findings of the study "Water, energy and land insecurity in global supply chains"

A systematic, and possibly first large-scale, cross-sectoral analysis of water, energy and land in security in 189 countries that links total and sectorial consumption to sources showed that countries and sectors are highly exposed to over-exploited, insecure, and degraded such resources with economic globalization having decreased security of global supply chains. The 2020 study finds that most countries exhibit greater exposure to resource risks via international trade – mainly from remote production sources – and that diversifying trading partners is unlikely to help countries and sectors to reduce these or to improve their resource self-sufficiency.

== Illicit trade ==
=== Illegal gold trade ===
A number of people in Africa, including children, were using informal or "artisanal" methods to produce gold. While millions were making a livelihood through this small-scale mining, governments of Ghana, Tanzania and Zambia complained about the increase in illegal production and gold smuggling. Sometimes the procedure involved criminal operations and even human and environmental cost. Investigative reports based on Africa's export data revealed that gold in large quantities is smuggled out of the country through the United Arab Emirates, without any taxes being paid to the producing states. Analysis also reflected discrepancies in the amount exported from Africa and the total gold imported into the UAE.

In July 2020, a report by Swissaid highlighted that the Dubai-based precious metal refining firms, including Kaloti Jewellery International Group and Trust One Financial Services (T1FS), received most of their gold from poor African states like Sudan. The gold mines in Sudan were seldom under the militias involved in war crimes and human rights abuses. The Swissaid report also highlighted that the illicit gold coming into Dubai from Africa is imported in large quantities by the world's largest refinery in Switzerland, Valcambi.

Another report in March 2022 revealed the contradiction between the lucrative gold trade of West African countries and the illicit dealings. Like Sudan, Democratic Republic of Congo (DRC), Ghana and other states, discrepancies were recorded between the gold production in Mali and its trade with Dubai, UAE. The third largest gold exporter in Africa, Mali imposed taxes only on the first 50 kg (110 lb) of gold exports per month, which allowed several small-scale miners to enjoy tax exemptions and smuggle gold worth millions. In 2014, Mali's gold production was 45.8 tonnes, while the UAE's gold imports were 59.9 tonnes.

== Statistics ==
- List of countries by imports
- List of countries by exports
  - List of countries by merchandise exports
  - List of countries by service exports and imports
  - List of top exporting countries by product category
  - List of countries by exports per capita
- List of countries by leading trade partners
- List of countries by net goods exports (Balance of trade)
- List of sovereign states by current account balance
- List of countries by tariff rate

== See also ==
- Index of international trade articles
- Aggressive legalism – Leveraging the rules in trade agreement
- Concertina model – International trade strategy
- Export control – Legislation regulating the export of harmful items
- Free trade – Absence of government restriction on international trade
- Free-trade area – Regional trade agreement
- Gravity model of trade – Bilateral trade flow model
- Import – Good brought into a jurisdiction
- Interdependence – Interdisciplinary study of systems
- International business – Trade at a transnational scale
- International trade law – Rules for trade between countries
- Internationalization – Increasing links to international markets
- Market segmentation index – Measure of the degree of monopoly power
- Mercantilism – Economic policy emphasizing exports
- Monopolistic competition in international trade – Imperfect competition of differentiated products that are not perfect substitutes
- Northwest Passage – Sea route north of North America
- Panama Canal – Shipping route across Central America
- Suez Canal – Artificial sea-level waterway in Egypt
- Tariff – Goods import or export tax
- Trade Adjustment Assistance – US internal economic program
- Trade bloc – Intergovernmental open trading group
- Trade finance – Strategies to facilitate trade
- Transfer problem – Possibility that a debtor country might gain by making payments to its creditor countries
- United Nations Conference on Trade and Development (UNCTAD)

== Sources ==
- Jones, Ronald W. (1961). "Comparative Advantage and the Theory of Tariffs". The Review of Economic Studies. 28 (3): 161–175. doi:10.2307/2295945. JSTOR 2295945.
- McKenzie, Lionel W. (1954). "Specialization and Efficiency in World Production". The Review of Economic Studies. 21 (3): 165–180. doi:10.2307/2295770. JSTOR 2295770.
- Samuelson, Paul (2001). "A Ricardo-Sraffa Paradigm Comparing the Gains from Trade in Inputs and Finished Goods". Journal of Economic Literature. 39 (4): 1204–1214. doi:10.1257/jel.39.4.1204.
