= United States balance of trade =

Aspect of US foreign trade

United States trade deficits from 1997 to 2021. Deficits are over 50 billion dollars as of 2021 with the countries shown. Data from the US Census Bureau.

The balance of trade of the United States moved into substantial deficit from the late 1990s, especially with China and other Asian countries. This has been accompanied by a relatively low savings ratio and high levels of government and corporate debt. Debate continues over the causes and impacts of this trade deficit, and the nature of any measures required in response.

== History ==
The US last had a trade surplus in 1975. In 1985, the United States began running a persistent trade deficit with China. During the 1990s, the overall U.S. trade deficit expanded, particularly with Asian economies. By 2012, the U.S. trade deficit, along with the federal budget deficit and public debt, reached record or near-record levels. In 2025, the seasonally adjusted U.S. goods and services deficit on a balance-of-payments basis was $901.5 billion, down $2.1 billion, or 0.2 percent, from 2024. Exports increased 6.2 percent to $3.4323 trillion and imports increased 4.8 percent to $4.3338 trillion. The goods deficit increased by $25.5 billion to $1.2409 trillion, while the services surplus increased by $27.6 billion to $339.5 billion.

== Causes and impact ==
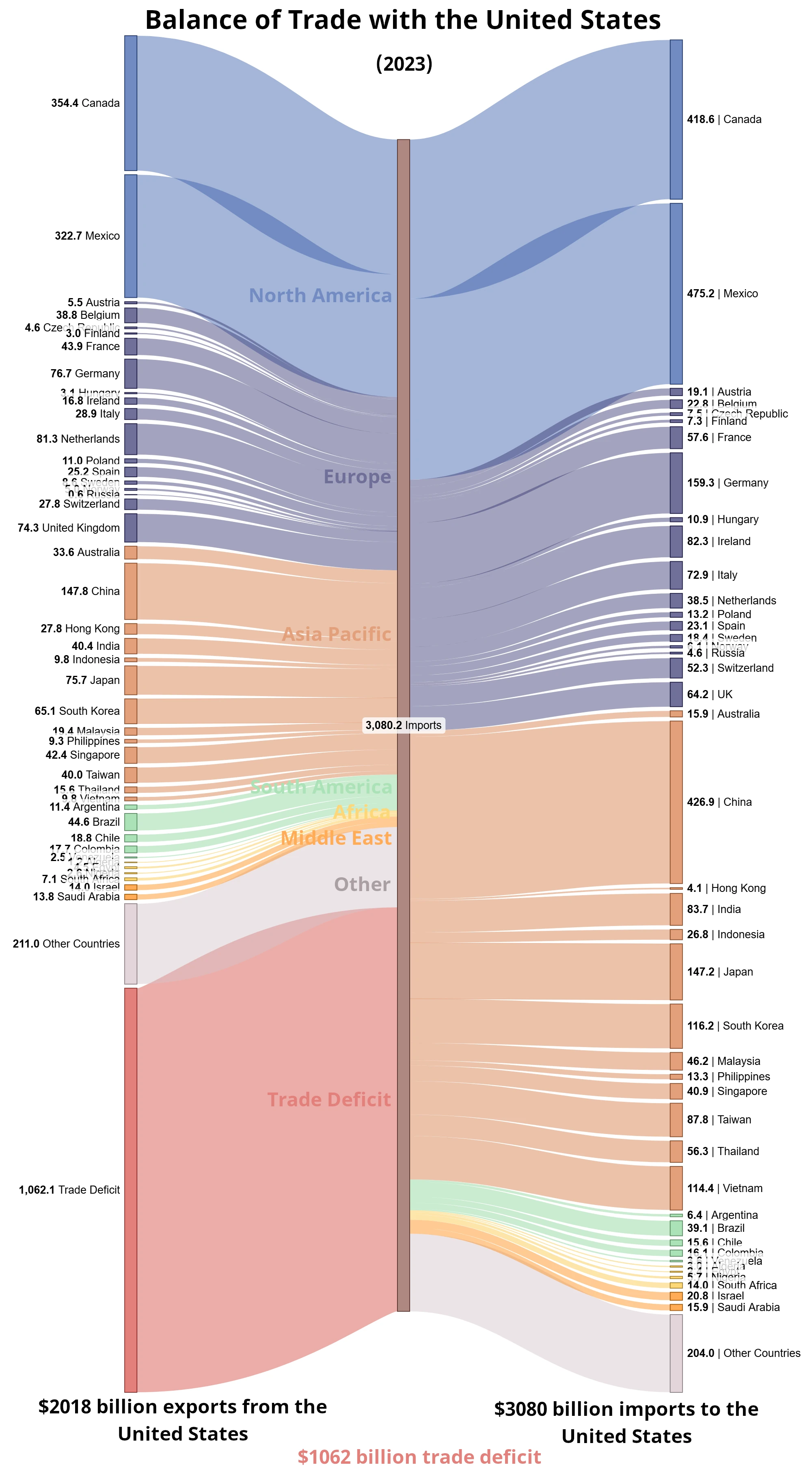
Balance of trade with the United States by country

The notion that bilateral trade deficits are bad in and of themselves is overwhelmingly rejected by trade experts and economists. Some economists note that the trade deficit increases when the U.S. economy grows and Americans are able to buy the goods and services they want from abroad. But many also worry that a persistent trade deficit could lead to lower employment and economic growth in the United States.

Over the long run, nations with trade surpluses tend also to have a savings surplus. The U.S. generally has developed lower savings rates than its trading partners, which have tended to have trade surpluses. Germany, France, Japan, and Canada have maintained higher savings rates than the U.S. over the long run.

According to Carla Norrlöf, there are three main benefits to trade deficits for the United States:

1. Greater consumption than production: the US enjoys the better side of the bargain by being able to consume more than it produces
2. Usage of efficiently produced foreign-made intermediate goods is productivity-enhancing for US firms: the US makes the most effective use of the global division of labor
3. A large market that other countries are reliant on for exports enhances American bargaining power in trade negotiations

== Balance of trade table ==
US trade in goods imbalance by country (2023)
Country	Exports (USD billion)	Imports (USD billion)	Trade imbalance (USD billion)	Trade imbalance / exports
China	147.8	426.9	-279.1	-1.89
Mexico	322.7	475.2	-152.5	-0.473
Vietnam	9.8	114.4	-104.6	-10.7
Germany	76.7	159.3	-82.6	-1.08
Japan	75.7	147.2	-71.5	-0.944
Ireland	16.8	82.3	-65.5	-3.90
Canada	354.4	418.6	-64.2	-0.181
South Korea	65.1	116.2	-51.1	-0.785
Taiwan	40.0	87.8	-47.8	-1.195
Italy	28.9	72.9	-44.0	-1.52
India	40.4	83.7	-43.3	-1.07
Thailand	15.6	56.3	-40.7	-2.61
Malaysia	19.4	46.2	-26.8	-1.38
Switzerland	27.8	52.3	-24.5	-0.881
Indonesia	9.8	26.8	-17.0	-1.73
France	43.9	57.6	-13.7	-0.312
Austria	5.5	19.1	-13.6	-2.47
Sweden	8.6	18.4	-9.8	-1.14
Hungary	3.1	10.9	-7.8	-2.52
South Africa	7.1	14.0	-6.9	-0.972
Israel	14.0	20.8	-6.8	-0.486
Finland	3.0	7.3	-4.3	-1.43
Russia	0.6	4.6	-4.0	-6.67
Philippines	9.3	13.3	-4.0	-0.430
Nigeria	2.6	5.7	-3.1	-1.19
Czech Republic	4.6	7.5	-2.9	-0.630
Poland	11.0	13.2	-2.2	-0.2
Saudi Arabia	13.8	15.9	-2.1	-0.152
Algeria	1.2	3.0	-1.8	-1.5
Norway	5.0	6.1	-1.1	-0.22
Venezuela	2.5	3.6	-1.1	-0.44
Singapore	42.4	40.9	1.5	0.035
Colombia	17.7	16.1	1.6	0.090
Spain	25.2	23.1	2.1	0.083
Egypt	4.5	2.4	2.1	0.467
Chile	18.8	15.6	3.2	0.170
Argentina	11.4	6.4	5.0	0.439
Brazil	44.6	39.1	5.5	0.123
United Kingdom	74.3	64.2	10.1	0.136
Belgium	38.8	22.8	16.0	0.412
Australia	33.6	15.9	17.7	0.527
Hong Kong	27.8	4.1	23.7	0.853
Netherlands	81.3	38.5	42.8	0.526
Other Countries	211.0	204.0	7.0	0.033
Total	2,018.1	3,080.2	-1062.1	

=== Balance of trade by select country by year ===
==== Canada ====
This table shows the balance of trade by year for Canada that is seasonally adjusted in the millions of dollars. This table only displays trade of goods. Source:

Year	Imports	Exports	Balance
2024	411,886.7	349,908.2	-61,978.5
2023	418,010.3	354,408.0	-63,602.3
2022	437,417.6	359,084.2	-78,333.4
2021	357,274.7	309,604.0	-47,670.7
2020	270,025.5	256,212.3	-13,813.3
2019	318,588.8	292,820.3	-25,768.5
2018	318,574.8	299,731.7	-18,843.1
2017	299,065.4	282,773.8	-16,291.6
2016	277,719.8	266,734.5	-10,985.3
2015	296,305.1	280,855.2	-15,449.9
2014	349,286.1	312,817.0	-36,469.2
2013	332,503.6	300,754.9	-31,748.8
2012	324,263.0	292,650.5	-31,612.5

==== China ====
This table shows the balance of trade by year for China that is seasonally adjusted in the millions of dollars. This table only displays trade of goods. Source:

Year	Imports	Exports	Balance
2024	438,742	143,226.7	-295,515.2
2023	427,246.6	147,635.5	-279,611.1
2022	536,268.7	153,987.4	-382,281.3
2021	504,246.3	151,439.4	-352,806.9
2020	432,548	124,581.5	-307,966.5
2019	449,110.7	106,481.2	-342,629.5
2018	538,514.2	120,281.2	-418,232.9
2017	505,165.1	129,997.2	-375,167.9
2016	462,420	115,594.8	-346,825.2
2015	483,201.7	115,873.4	-367,328.3
2014	468,474.9	123,657.2	-344,817.7
2013	440,430.0	121,746.2	-318,683.8
2012	425,619.1	110,516.6	-315,102.5

==== Mexico ====
This table shows the balance of trade by year the United States has with Mexico that is seasonally adjusted in the millions of dollars. This table only displays trade of goods. The last year the United States had a trade surplus with Mexico was in 1994. Source:

Year	Imports	Exports	Balance
2024	505,523.2	334,031.9	-171,491.2
2023	472,907.4	323,637.2	-149,270.2
2022	452,015	327,016.1	-124,998.8
2021	382,569.3	277,194.6	-105,374.7
2020	323,476.9	212,512.8	-110,964.1
2019	356,093.6	256,676.5	-99,417.1
2018	343,680.5	265,968	-77,712.5
2017	312,666.7	243,609	-69,057.8
2016	293,500.6	230,228.8	-63,271.8
2015	296,433.3	236,460.1	-59,973.2
2014	295,730.0	241,007.2	-54,722.8
2013	280,556.0	225,954.4	-54,601.7
2012	277,593.6	215,875.1	-61,718.5

==== India ====
This table shows the balance of trade by year the United States has with India that is seasonally adjusted in the millions of dollars. This table only displays trade of goods. Source:

Year	Imports	Exports	Balance
2024	87,338.1	41,537	-45,801.1
2023	83,557.1	40,317.5	-43,239.6
2022	85,517.4	46,819.2	-38,698.2
2021	73,308.2	39,817.4	-33,490.8
2020	51,254.6	27,081.7	-24,172.9
2019	57,879.0	34,222.8	-23,656.2
2018	54,249.6	33,176.6	-21,073.0
2017	48,549.4	25,647.8	-22,901.6
2016	46,024.2	21,647.2	-24,377.1
2015	44,782.7	21,452.9	-23,329.7
2014	45,358.0	21,499.1	-23,858.9
2013	41,810.0	21,810.4	-19,999.5
2012	40,512.6	22,105.7	-18,406.9

=== Balance of trade by year ===
This table lists the balance of trade by year in millions of dollars and this contains the seasonally adjusted results regardless of country. This table only displays trade of goods. Source:

Year	Imports	Exports	Balance
2024	3,266,410.2	2,061,690.8	-1,204,719.4
2023	3,076,796.4	2,020,479.2	-1,056,317.2
2022	3,239,732.9	2,072,648	-1,167,084.9
2021	2,828,515.5	1,757,743.7	-1,070,771.8
2020	2,331,477.2	1,429,995.4	-901,481.8
2019	2,491,699.6	1,645,940.3	-845,759.2
2018	2,536,145.3	1,665,786.9	-870,358.4
2017	2,339,591.3	1,547,195.4	-792,395.9
2016	1,451,459	2,186,785	-735,326
2015	1,503,328.4	2,248,811.4	-745,483
2014	1,621,873.8	2,356,356.1	-734,482.3
2013	2,267,986.7	1,578,516.9	-689,469.9
2012	2,276,267.1	1,545,820.8	-730,446.3
2011	2,207,954.0	1,482,507.0	-725,447.0
2010	1,913,858.0	1,278,493.0	-635,365.0

== July 2026 ==
The "goods and services deficit was $88.6 billion in July", according to website BEA.gov.

== See also ==
- Foreign trade of the United States
- United States foreign aid
