= Balance of trade =

Difference between the monetary value of exports and imports

Balance of trade is the difference between the monetary value of a nation's exports and imports of goods over a certain time period. Sometimes, trade in services is also included in the balance of trade but the official IMF definition only considers goods. The balance of trade measures a flow variable of exports and imports over a given period of time. The notion of the balance of trade does not mean that exports and imports are "in balance" with each other.

If a country exports a greater value than it imports, it has a trade surplus or positive trade balance, and conversely, if a country imports a greater value than it exports, it has a trade deficit or negative trade balance. As of 2016, about 60 out of 200 countries have a trade surplus. The world's largest trade surpluses are held by China ($823 billion), Germany ($226 billion), and Singapore ($154 billion), while the largest trade deficits are held by the United States ($1.15 trillion), United Kingdom ($271 billion), and India ($241 billion).

Economists reject the idea that a trade deficit is detrimental to a nation's economy, and the idea that a bilateral trade deficit is inherently bad.

== Explanation ==
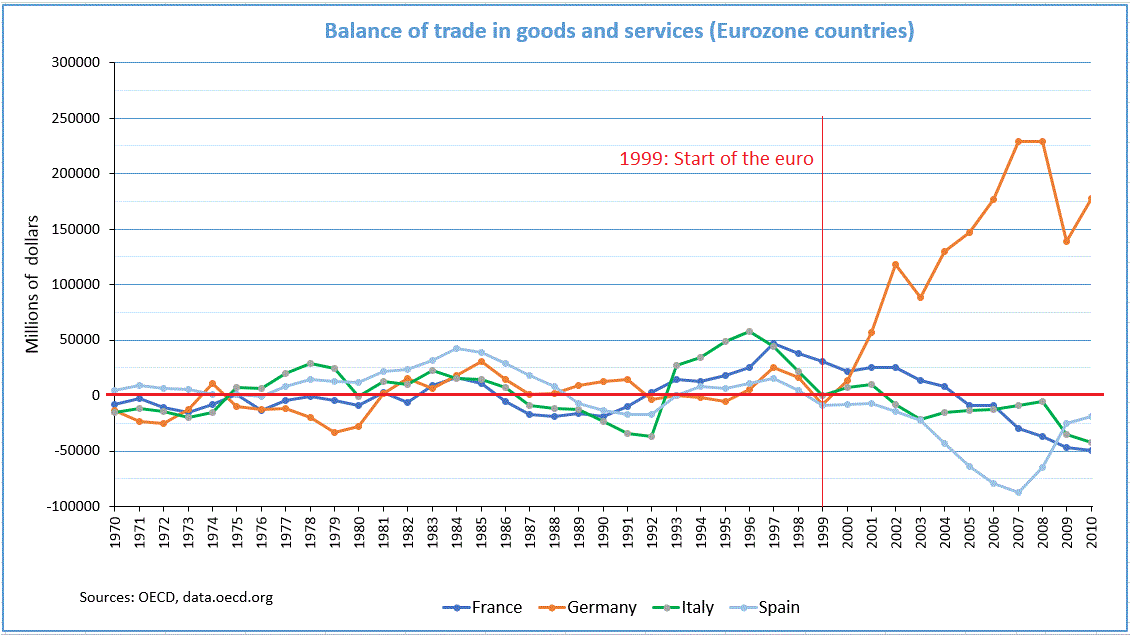
Balance of trade in goods and services (Eurozone countries)

US trade balance from 1960

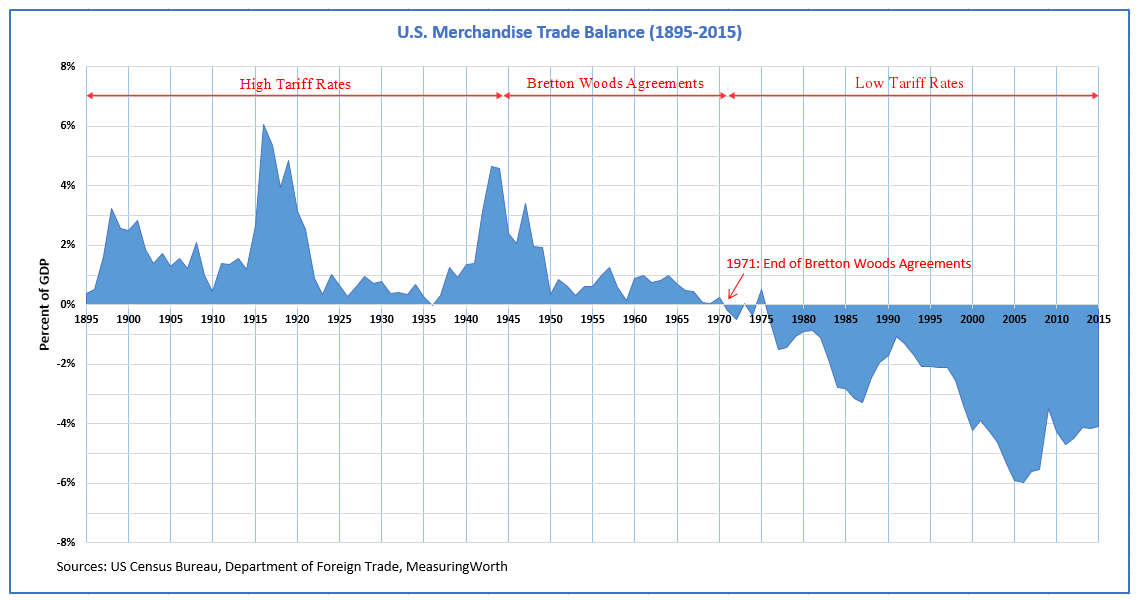
U.S. trade balance and trade policy (1895–2015)

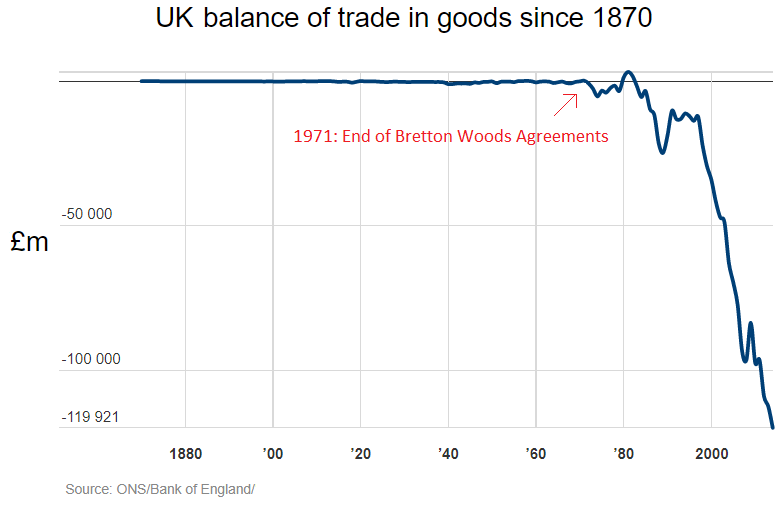
U.K. balance of trade in goods (since 1870)

The balance of trade forms part of the current account, which includes other transactions such as income from the net international investment position as well as international aid. If the current account is in surplus, the country's net international asset position increases correspondingly. Equally, a deficit decreases the net international asset position.

The trade balance is identical to the difference between a country's output and its domestic demand (the difference between what goods a country produces and how many goods it buys from abroad; this does not include money re-spent on foreign stock, nor does it factor in the concept of importing goods to produce for the domestic market).

Measuring the balance of trade can be problematic because of problems with recording and collecting data. As an illustration of this problem, when official data for all the world's countries are added up, exports exceed imports by almost 1%; it appears the world is running a positive balance of trade with itself. This cannot be true, because all transactions involve an equal credit or debit in the account of each nation. The discrepancy is widely believed to be explained by transactions intended to launder money or evade taxes, smuggling and other visibility problems. While the accuracy of developing countries' statistics would be suspicious, most of the discrepancy actually occurs between developed countries with trusted statistics.

Factors that can affect the balance of trade include:

- The cost of production (land, labor, capital, taxes, incentives, etc.) in the exporting economy vis-à-vis those in the importing economy;
- The cost and availability of raw materials, intermediate goods and other inputs;
- Currency exchange rate movements;
- Multilateral, bilateral and unilateral taxes or restrictions on trade;
- Non-tariff barriers such as environmental, health or safety standards;
- The availability of adequate foreign exchange with which to pay for imports; and
- Prices of goods manufactured at home (influenced by the responsiveness of supply)

In addition, the trade balance is likely to differ across the business cycle. In export-led growth (such as oil and early industrial goods), the balance of trade will shift towards exports during an economic expansion. However, with domestic demand-led growth (as in the United States and Australia) the trade balance will shift towards imports at the same stage in the business cycle.

The monetary balance of trade is different from the physical balance of trade (which is expressed in amount of raw materials, known also as Total Material Consumption). Developed countries usually import a substantial amount of raw materials from developing countries. Typically, these imported materials are transformed into finished products and might be exported after adding value. Financial trade balance statistics conceal material flow. Most developed countries have a large physical trade deficit because they consume more raw materials than they produce.

== Examples ==
=== Historical example ===
Many countries in early modern Europe adopted a policy of mercantilism, which theorized that a trade surplus was beneficial to a country. Mercantilist ideas also influenced how European nations regulated trade policies with their colonies, promoting the idea that natural resources and cash crops should be exported to Europe, with processed goods being exported back to the colonies in return. Ideas such as bullionism spurred the popularity of mercantilism in European governments.

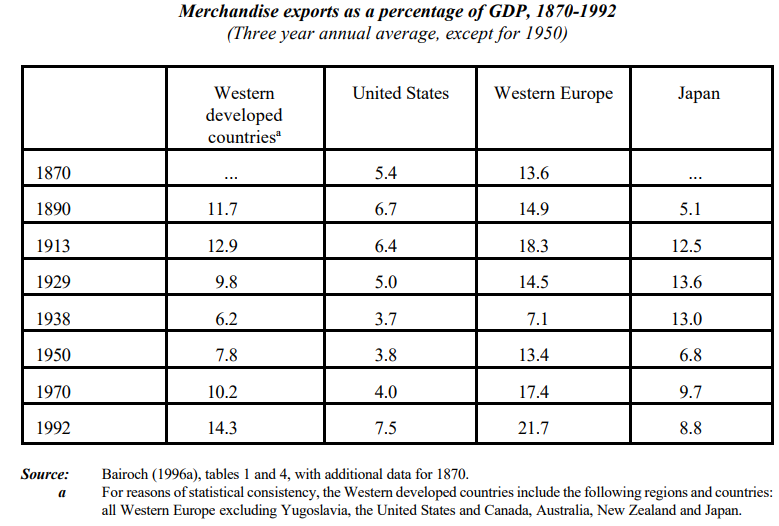
Merchandise exports (1870–1992)

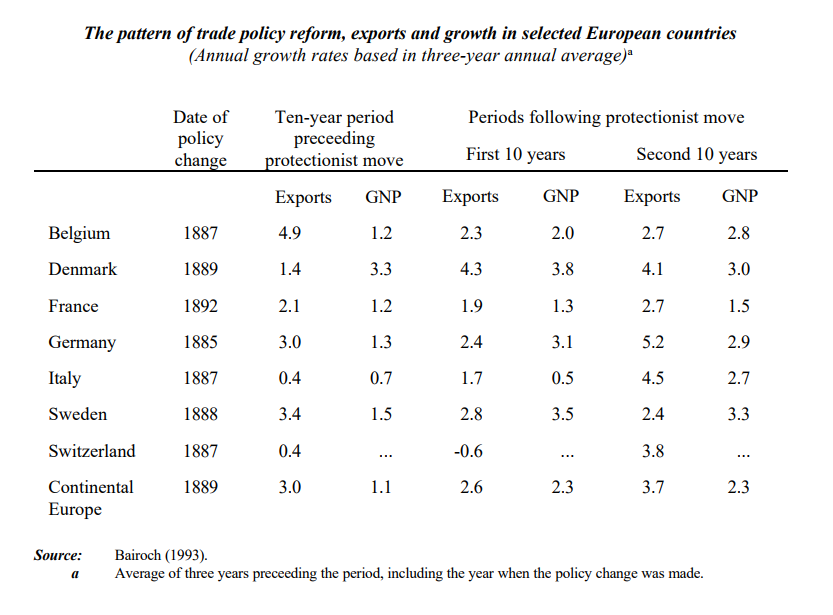
Trade policy, exports and growth in selected European countries

An early statement concerning the balance of trade appeared in Discourse of the Common Wealth of this Realm of England, 1549: "We must always take heed that we buy no more from strangers than we sell them, for so should we impoverish ourselves and enrich them." Similarly, a systematic and coherent explanation of balance of trade was made public through Thomas Mun's 1630 "England's treasure by foreign trade, or, The balance of our foreign trade is the rule of our treasure".

Since the mid-1980s, the United States has had a growing deficit in tradeable goods, especially with Asian nations (China and Japan) which now hold large sums of U.S. debt that has in part funded the consumption. The U.S. has a trade surplus with nations such as Australia. The issue of trade deficits can be complex. Trade deficits generated in tradeable goods such as manufactured goods or software may impact domestic employment to different degrees than do trade deficits in raw materials.

Economies that have savings surpluses, such as Japan and Germany, typically run trade surpluses. China, a high-growth economy, has tended to run trade surpluses. A higher savings rate generally corresponds to a trade surplus. Correspondingly, the U.S. with its lower savings rate has tended to run high trade deficits, especially with Asian nations.

Some have said that China pursues a mercantilist economic policy. Russia pursues a policy based on protectionism, according to which international trade is not a win–win game but a zero-sum game: surplus countries get richer at the expense of deficit countries.

== Views on economic impact ==
The notion that bilateral trade deficits are bad in and of themselves is overwhelmingly rejected by trade experts and economists. According to the IMF trade deficits can cause a balance of payments problem, which can affect foreign exchange shortages and hurt countries. On the other hand, Joseph Stiglitz points out that countries running surpluses exert a "negative externality" on trading partners, and pose a threat to global prosperity, far more than those in deficit. Ben Bernanke argues that "persistent imbalances within the euro zone are... unhealthy, as they lead to financial imbalances as well as to unbalanced growth. The fact that Germany is selling so much more than it is buying redirects demand from its neighbors (as well as from other countries around the world), reducing output and employment outside Germany." According to Carla Norrlöf, there are three main benefits to trade deficits for the United States:

1. Greater consumption than production: the US enjoys the better side of the bargain by being able to consume more than it produces
2. Usage of efficiently produced foreign-made intermediate goods is productivity-enhancing for US firms: the US makes the most effective use of the global division of labor
3. A large market that other countries are reliant on for exports enhances American bargaining power in trade negotiations

A 2018 National Bureau of Economic Research paper by economists at the International Monetary Fund and University of California, Berkeley, found in a study of 151 countries over 1963–2014 that the imposition of tariffs had little effect on the trade balance.

=== Classical theory ===
==== Adam Smith on the balance of trade ====
In the foregoing part of this chapter I have endeavoured to show, even upon the principles of the commercial system, how unnecessary it is to lay extraordinary restraints upon the importation of goods from those countries with which the balance of trade is supposed to be disadvantageous. Nothing, however, can be more absurd than this whole doctrine of the balance of trade, upon which, not only these restraints, but almost all the other regulations of commerce are founded. When two places trade with one another, this [absurd] doctrine supposes that, if the balance be even, neither of them either loses or gains; but if it leans in any degree to one side, that one of them loses and the other gains in proportion to its declension from the exact equilibrium.

— Smith, 1776, book IV, ch. iii, part ii

=== Keynesian theory ===
In the last few years of his life, John Maynard Keynes was much preoccupied with the question of balance in international trade. He was the leader of the British delegation to the United Nations Monetary and Financial Conference in 1944 that established the Bretton Woods system of international currency management. He was the principal author of a proposal – the so-called Keynes Plan – for an International Clearing Union. The two governing principles of the plan were that the problem of settling outstanding balances should be solved by "creating" additional "international money", and that debtor and creditor should be treated almost alike as disturbers of equilibrium. In the event, though, the plans were rejected, in part because "American opinion was naturally reluctant to accept the principle of equality of treatment so novel in debtor-creditor relationships".

The new system is not founded on free-trade (liberalisation of foreign trade) but rather on the regulation of international trade, in order to eliminate trade imbalances: the nations with a surplus would have a powerful incentive to get rid of it, and in doing so they would automatically clear other nations' deficits. He proposed a global bank that would issue its own currency – the bancor – which was exchangeable with national currencies at fixed rates of exchange and would become the unit of account between nations, which means it would be used to measure a country's trade deficit or trade surplus. Every country would have an overdraft facility in its bancor account at the International Clearing Union. He pointed out that surpluses lead to weak global aggregate demand – countries running surpluses exert a "negative externality" on trading partners, and posed far more than those in deficit, a threat to global prosperity. In "National Self-Sufficiency" The Yale Review, Vol. 22, no. 4 (June 1933), he already highlighted the problems created by free trade.

His view, supported by many economists and commentators at the time, was that creditor nations may be just as responsible as debtor nations for disequilibrium in exchanges and that both should be under an obligation to bring trade back into a state of balance. Failure for them to do so could have serious consequences. In the words of Geoffrey Crowther, then editor of The Economist, "If the economic relationships between nations are not, by one means or another, brought fairly close to balance, then there is no set of financial arrangements that can rescue the world from the impoverishing results of chaos."

These ideas were informed by events prior to the Great Depression when – in the opinion of Keynes and others – international lending, primarily by the U.S., exceeded the capacity of sound investment and so got diverted into non-productive and speculative uses, which in turn invited default and a sudden stop to the process of lending.

Influenced by Keynes, economics texts in the immediate post-war period put a significant emphasis on balance in trade. For example, the second edition of the popular introductory textbook, An Outline of Money, devoted the last three of its ten chapters to questions of foreign exchange management and in particular the 'problem of balance'. However, in more recent years, since the end of the Bretton Woods system in 1971, with the increasing influence of monetarist schools of thought in the 1980s, and particularly in the face of large sustained trade imbalances, these concerns – and particularly concerns about the destabilising effects of large trade surpluses – have largely disappeared from mainstream economics discourse and Keynes' insights have slipped from view.

=== Monetarist theory ===
Prior to 20th-century monetarist theory, the 19th-century economist and philosopher Frédéric Bastiat expressed the idea that trade deficits actually were a manifestation of profit, rather than a loss. He proposed as an example to suppose that he, a Frenchman, exported French wine and imported British coal, turning a profit. He supposed he was in France and sent a cask of wine which was worth 50 francs to England. The customhouse would record an export of 50 francs. If in England, the wine sold for 70 francs (or the pound equivalent), which he then used to buy coal, which he imported into France (the customhouse would record an import of 70 francs), and was found to be worth 90 francs in France, he would have made a profit of 40 francs. But the customhouse would say that the value of imports exceeded that of exports and was trade deficit of 20 against the ledger of France. This is not true for the current account that would be in surplus.

By reductio ad absurdum, Bastiat argued that the national trade deficit was an indicator of a successful economy, rather than a failing one. Bastiat predicted that a successful, growing economy would result in greater trade deficits, and an unsuccessful, shrinking economy would result in lower trade deficits. This was later, in the 20th century, echoed by economist Milton Friedman.

In the 1980s, Friedman, a Nobel Memorial Prize-winning economist and a proponent of monetarism, contended that some of the concerns of trade deficits are unfair criticisms in an attempt to push macroeconomic policies favorable to exporting industries.

Friedman argued that trade deficits are not necessarily important, as high exports raise the value of the currency, reducing aforementioned exports, and vice versa for imports, thus naturally removing trade deficits not due to investment. Since 1971, when the Nixon administration decided to abolish fixed exchange rates, America's Current Account accumulated trade deficits have totaled $7.75 trillion as of 2010. This deficit exists as it is matched by investment coming into the United States – purely by the definition of the balance of payments, any current account deficit that exists is matched by an inflow of foreign investment.

In the late 1970s and early 1980s, the U.S. had experienced high inflation and Friedman's policy positions tended to defend the stronger dollar at that time. He stated his belief that these trade deficits were not necessarily harmful to the economy at the time since the currency comes back to the country (country A sells to country B, country B sells to country C who buys from country A, but the trade deficit only includes A and B). However, it may be in one form or another including the possible tradeoff of foreign control of assets. In his view, the "worst-case scenario" of the currency never returning to the country of origin was actually the best possible outcome: the country actually purchased its goods by exchanging them for pieces of cheaply made paper. As Friedman put it, this would be the same result as if the exporting country burned the dollars it earned, never returning it to market circulation.

This position is a more refined version of the theorem first discovered by David Hume. Hume argued that England could not permanently gain from exports, because hoarding gold (i.e., currency) would make gold more plentiful in England; therefore, the prices of English goods would rise, making them less attractive exports and making foreign goods more attractive imports. In this way, countries' trade balances would balance out.

Friedman presented his analysis of the balance of trade in Free to Choose, widely considered his most significant popular work.

=== Trade balance’s effects upon a nation's GDP ===
Exports directly increase and imports directly reduce a nation's balance of trade (i.e. net exports). A trade surplus is a positive net balance of trade, and a trade deficit is a negative net balance of trade. Due to the balance of trade being explicitly added to the calculation of the nation's gross domestic product using the expenditure method of calculating gross domestic product (i.e. GDP), trade surpluses are contributions and trade deficits are "drags" upon their nation's GDP; however, foreign made goods sold (e.g., retail) contribute to total GDP.

== Balance of trade vs. balance of payments ==
Balance of trade	Balance of payments
Includes only visible imports and exports, i.e. imports and exports of merchandise. The difference between exports and imports is called the balance of trade. If imports are greater than exports, it is sometimes called an unfavourable balance of trade. If exports exceed imports, it is sometimes called a favourable balance of trade.	Includes all those visible and invisible items exported from and imported into the country in addition to exports and imports of merchandise.
Includes revenues received or paid on account of imports and exports of merchandise. It shows only revenue items.	Includes all revenue and capital items whether visible or non-visible. The balance of trade thus forms a part of the balance of payments.

== Statistics ==
- List of countries by net goods exports

== See also ==
- Base erosion and profit shifting
- Capital surplus
- Criticisms of globalization
- Dutch disease
- Government budget balance
- Global labor arbitrage
- List of countries by service exports
- Offshoring
- Transfer problem
