= Concertina model =

International trade strategy

The concertina model, sometimes referred to as the concertina rule or concertina method, is an international trade liberalisation strategy, which consists of removing the highest tariffs first. Amiti (2004, p. 3) traces this "idea back to Meade (1955, Trade and Welfare) who concluded that the welfare gains will be larger if tariffs on those goods with the highest tariffs are reduced first. This result was formalized by a number of authors, including Bertrand and Vanek (1971) and Falvey (1988) for a small, open, perfectly competitive economy."

The concertina method consists in a piecemeal approach to trade reforms, however, with a clear quantitative priority setting. The concertina model is also highlighted briefly in Dani Rodrik's book One Economics, Many Recipes and Max Corden's textbook Trade Policy and Economic Welfare. Haussmann, Rodrik and Velasco (HRV)(Growth Diagnostics, 2004) refer to the concertina method as a simple trade and more specifically, tariff reform, second best strategy. The concertina method is a general rule of thumb, which consists in eliminating the highest tariffs first, and so on, until ideally all tariffs are eliminated.

"HRV" see 5 possible reform strategies: 1. Wholesale reform ("augmented Washington Consensus": getting prices and institutions right) 2. Do as much and as best as you can (opportunistic approach, e.g. picking low "hanging fruits", etc.) 3. Sophisticated second-best reform (many trade offs) 4. Target the largest distortions ("concertina rule") 5. Focus on the most binding constraints.

Targeting the largest distortions first in the overall economic reform agenda is not very practical as many important distortions (e.g. with respect to institutions) cannot be easily quantified, hence a deeper qualitative analysis is needed. Focussing on the binding constraints is seen by these "HRV" as the best practical reform agenda. It is superior to the "concertina rule" and also to the so-called "augmented Washington Consensus" which is an impossibly broad and ambitious reform agenda that is insufficiently differentiated according to the needs of different countries. The Concertina policy approach can be seen as a simple rule of thumb approach for an easy quantifiable problem. Reforming implies planning. However planning has clear limits due to limits to rationality ("bounded rationality" see Simon (1957) and Lindblom (1979)). The HRV approach again is an approach based on rationality. Human interactions often defy a clear rationality or rationality changes with respect to the number of peoples or interest groups involved (see Olson, Mancur's Logic of Collective Action).
