= List of countries by tariff rate =

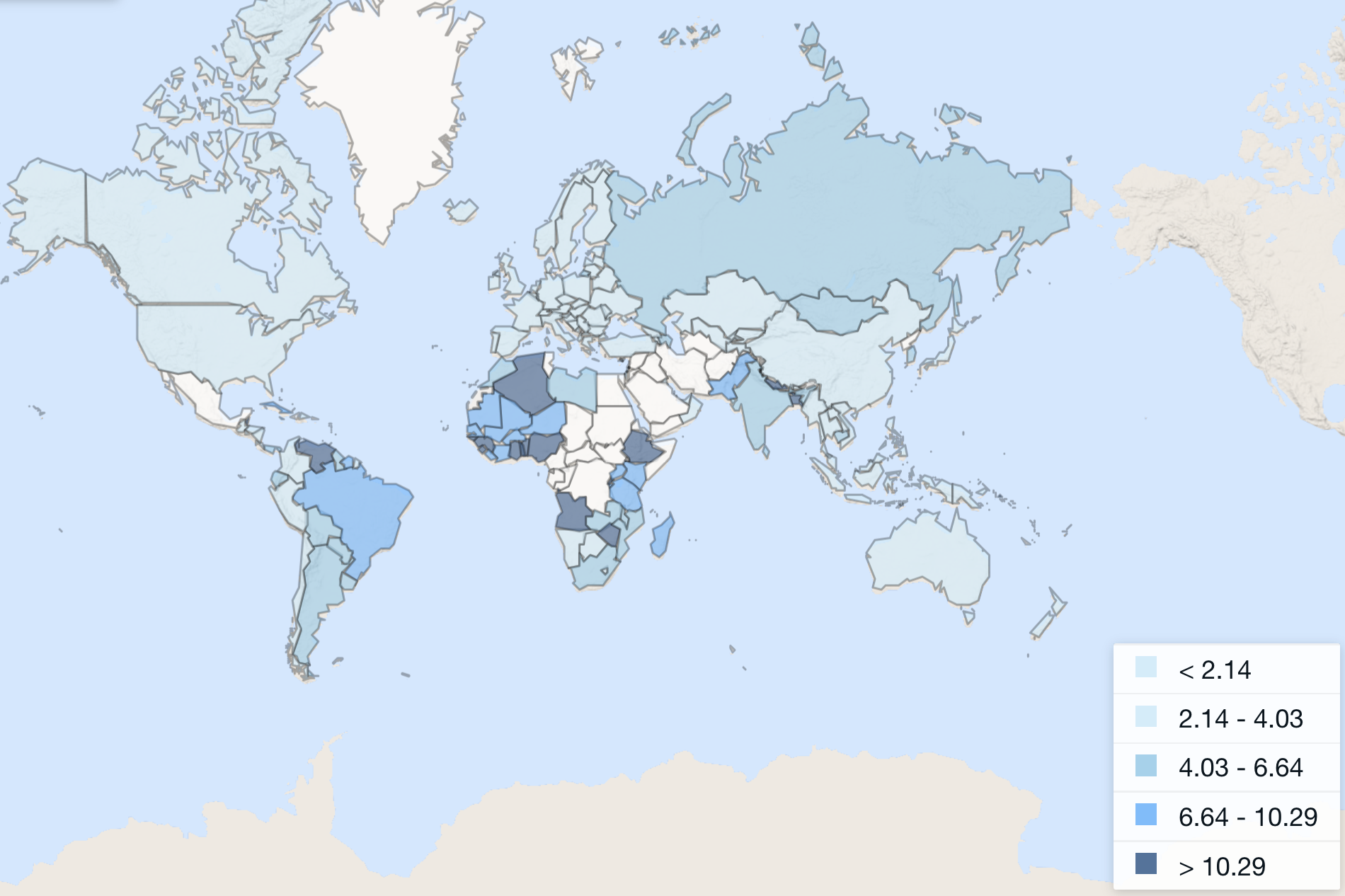
Countries by tariff rate, applied, weighted mean, all products (%), 2025, according to World Bank

This is a list of countries by tariff rate. The list includes sovereign states and self-governing dependent territories based upon the ISO standard ISO 3166-1. Import duty refers to taxes levied on imported goods, capital and services. The level of customs duties is a direct indicator of the openness of an economy to world trade. However, there may also be import barriers that are not based on the levy of duties. The following table shows the tariff rate, in percentages, according to United Nations Conference on Trade and Development (UNCTAD), World Trade Organization, and World Bank.

UNCTAD indicators are based on MFN (Most Favoured Nation) and effectively applied import tariff rates for major categories of non-agricultural and non-fuel products by individual country (as market economy). Average tariff of a market country is calculated by taking into consideration all products that are imported by the market country, regardless of trade.

WTO indicators are based on MFN (Most Favoured Nation) tariffs applied by the reporting country/economy. Trade weighted average duty (Percent) means MFN applied tariff averages weighted with import flows for traded national tariff lines.

WB values are estimates, using the World Integrated Trade Solution system, based on data from United Nations Conference on Trade and Development's Trade Analysis and Information System (TRAINS) database and the World Trade Organization's (WTO) Integrated Data Base (IDB) and Consolidated Tariff Schedules (CTS) database.

== List of countries by tariff rate ==
Sorting is alphabetical by country code, according to ISO 3166-1 alpha-3. After sorting the "World" row moves to the bottom with the regional rows.

List of countries by tariff rate
Country/Territory/Region/Group	WB		WTO		UNCTAD	
Country/Territory/Region/Group	Tariff rate, applied, weighted mean, all products	Year	Simple average applied MFN tariff, all products	Year	Import tariff rates on non-agricultural and non-fuel products	Year
(United Nations) WORLD	2.59%	2017				
Aruba	0%	2021			10.80%	2021
Afghanistan	0%	2018	6.5%	2018	0%	2018
Albania	0%	2021	3.6%	2021	0%	2021
Algeria			18.9%	2022		
Angola	0%	2021	11%	2023	0%	2021
Anguilla					13.14%	2021
Antigua and Barbuda	13.07%	2021	9.9%	2021	12.95%	2021
United Arab Emirates	0%	2021	4.8%	2021	0%	2021
Argentina	6.51%	2021	13.4%	2023	7.40%	2021
Armenia	3.61%	2021	6.3%	2023	3.54%	2021
Australia	0.99%	2022	2.4%	2023	0.84%	2021
Austria	1.39%	2021	EU member		0.96%	2021
Azerbaijan	6.01%	2021	8.2%	2023	6.16%	2021
Bahrain	2.09%	2021	4.5%	2023	3.16%	2021
Bangladesh	10.95%	2021	14.1%	2023	13.11%	2021
Barbados	12.24%	2021	13.9%	2022	8.44%	2021
Belarus	2.27%	2021	6.7%	2021	1.94%	2021
Belgium	1.39%	2021	EU member		1.33%	2021
Belize	17.79%	2021	11.9%	2023	10.32%	2021
Benin	10.89%	2021	12.0%	2023	8.61%	2021
Bermuda	23.84%	2021			20.80%	2021
Bhutan	3.33%	2021	9.3%	2023	3.09%	2021
Bulgaria	1.39%	2021	EU member		1.28%	2019
Burkina Faso	7.30%	2021	12.0%	2023	7.98%	2021
Burundi	8.53%	2021	14.0%	2023	5.78%	2021
Bahamas	17.05%	2018	32.5%	2018	24.75%	2018
Bolivia	5.12%	2021	11.8%	2023	5.43%	2021
Bosnia and Herzegovina	2.80%	2021	6.2%	2023	2.15%	2021
Botswana	0.95%	2021	7.5%	2023	1.28%	2021
Brazil	7.26%	2022	11.2%	2023	8.79%	2021
Brunei	0.02%	2021	0.5%	2023	0.03%	2021
Cambodia			9.4%	2023		
Cameroon	15.46%	2019	18.1%	2023	13.75%	2019
Canada	2.35%	2021	3.8%	2023	1.63%	2021
Central African Republic	16.44%	2017	18.1%	2023	16.21%	2017
Chad			18.1%	2023		
Chile	0.43%	2021	6.0%	2023	0.45%	2021
China	2.18%	2022	7.5%	2023	2.12%	2021
Ivory Coast	7.63%	2021	12.1%	2023	8.82%	2021
Democratic Republic of the Congo	8.40%	2020	18.1%	2023	8.17%	2020
Cook Islands			3.5%	2021	0.59%	2021
Colombia	2.58%	2021	5.8%	2021	2.68%	2021
Comoros	4.34%	2021	15.1%	2021	4.78%	2021
Cape Verde	9.96%	2021	10.2%	2021	8.33%	2021
Costa Rica	1.43%	2021	5.6%	2021	0.88%	2021
Cuba	8.91%	2021	4.4%	2021	10.18%	2021
Cayman Islands	20.39%	2021			19.42%	2021
Cyprus	1.39%	2021	EU member		1.46%	2021
Czech Republic	1.39%	2021	EU member		1.14%	2021
Germany	1.33%	2022	EU member		1.39%	2021
Djibouti	17.56%	2014			19.59%	2014
Dominica	7.84%	2020	10.7%	2020	9.93%	2020
Denmark	1.39%	2021	EU member		1.95%	2021
Dominican Republic	3.80%	2021	7.5%	2021	4.30%	2021
Algeria	10.29%	2021	19.0%	2021	10.25%	2021
Ecuador	4.63%	2021	11.2%	2021	5.05%	2021
Egypt	10.43%	2019	19.0%	2019	5.70%	2019
Eritrea	5.43%	2006			7.11%	2006
Estonia	1.39%	2021	EU member		2.10%	2021
Ethiopia	12.66%	2021	17.0%	2021	12.76%	2021
Finland	1.39%	2021	EU member		1.35%	2021
Fiji	8.35%	2021	7.9%	2021	4.16%	2021
France	1.33%	2022	EU member		1.53%	2021
Federated States of Micronesia			5.1%	2021		
Gabon	14.50%	2019	17.7%	2019	14.11%	2019
Georgia	0.34%	2021	1.4%	2021	0.03%	2021
Ghana	10.51%	2021	12.1%	2021	9.89%	2021
Guinea	12.26%	2021	12.1%	2021	11.29%	2021
Gambia	17.69%	2021	12.1%	2021	17.80%	2021
Guinea-Bissau	11.82%	2021	12.1%	2021	10.32%	2021
Equatorial Guinea	15.63%	2007			14.51%	2007
Greece	1.39%	2021	EU member		1.92%	2021
Grenada	10.79%	2019	11.0%	2019	9.07%	2019
Guatemala	1.72%	2021	5.6%	2021	1.77%	2021
Guyana	4.73%	2021	11.7%	2021	3.97%	2021
Hong Kong	0.00%	2021	0.0%	2021	0.00%	2021
Honduras	2.85%	2021	5.8%	2021	2.67%	2021
Croatia	1.39%	2021	EU member		1.57%	2021
Haiti	6.76%	2020	4.9%	2020	6.39%	2020
Hungary	1.39%	2021	EU member		1.04%	2021
Indonesia	1.83%	2021	8.1%	2021	1.61%	2021
India	4.59%	2022	18.3%	2021	6.04%	2021
Ireland	1.33%	2022	EU member		1.53%	2020
Iran	12.09%	2020	20.1%	2020	12.66%	2020
Iceland	1.51%	2021	3.1%	2021	0.00%	2021
Israel	2.88%	2021	3.6%	2021	2.13%	2021
Italy	1.39%	2021	EU member		1.63%	2021
Jamaica	8.61%	2021	8.6%	2021	9.13%	2021
Jordan	3.98%	2020	10.1%	2020	3.44%	2020
Japan	1.64%	2022	4.2%	2021	0.76%	2021
Kazakhstan	2.17%	2021	5.7%	2021	2.15%	2021
Kenya	9.30%	2021	13.2%	2021	7.27%	2021
Kyrgyzstan	3.01%	2021	6.5%	2021	2.94%	2021
Cambodia	5.37%	2021	10.2%	2021	6.20%	2021
Kiribati			0.0%	2021		
Saint Kitts and Nevis	8.84%	2020	9.2%	2020	8.78%	2020
South Korea	4.85%	2021	13.6%	2021	1.09%	2021
Kuwait	2.85%	2021	4.7%	2021	3.16%	2021
Laos	1.12%	2021	8.6%	2021	1.21%	2021
Lebanon	2.83%	2020	6.0%	2020	2.36%	2020
Liberia	6.64%	2021	12.1%	2021	6.09%	2021
Libya	4.03%	2021	5.2%	2021	4.27%	2021
Saint Lucia	9.08%	2020	9.2%	2021	9.55%	2020
Sri Lanka	4.36%	2021	6.0%	2021	1.73%	2021
Lesotho	3.35%	2021	7.7%	2021	4.44%	2021
Lithuania	1.39%	2021	EU member		2.29%	2021
Luxembourg	1.39%	2021	EU member		1.47%	2021
Latvia	1.39%	2021	EU member		1.18%	2021
Macau	0.00%	2021	0.0%	2021	0.00%	2021
Morocco	4.23%	2021	14.2%	2021	2.91%	2021
Moldova	1.20%	2021	5.3%	2021	1.05%	2021
Madagascar	7.51%	2021	11.7%	2021	8.03%	2021
Maldives	11.12%	2022	11.4%	2021	11.25%	2021
Mexico	1.21%	2018	7.1%	2021	1.33%	2018
North Macedonia	2.38%	2021	6.7%	2021	1.10%	2021
Mali	7.88%	2021	12.1%	2021	7.35%	2021
Malta	1.39%	2021	EU member		2.09%	2019
Myanmar	0.82%	2022	6.5%	2021	0.95%	2021
Montenegro	3.19%	2021	3.7%	2021	1.24%	2021
Mongolia	5.28%	2021	5.2%	2021	4.69%	2021
Mozambique	4.19%	2021	10.3%	2021	4.37%	2021
Mauritania	8.32%	2021	12.0%	2021	10.03%	2021
Montserrat					11.61%	2021
Mauritius	1.27%	2021	0.8%	2021	0.86%	2021
Malawi	5.95%	2021	12.2%	2021	5.13%	2021
Malaysia	3.62%	2021	5.6%	2021	3.78%	2021
Namibia	1.32%	2021	7.7%	2021	1.05%	2021
Niger	8.46%	2021	12.1%	2021	7.76%	2021
Nigeria	12.20%	2021	12.1%	2021	12.30%	2021
Nicaragua	1.96%	2021	5.7%	2021	2.07%	2021
Netherlands	1.39%	2021	EU member		1.48%	2021
Norway	3.00%	2021	5.9%	2021	0.13%	2021
Nepal	11.2%	2022	12.7%	2021	11.88%	2021
Nauru	14.07%	2021	12.9%	2021	13.35%	2021
New Zealand	0.86%	2021	1.9%	2021	0.90%	2021
Oman	2.14%	2022	5.6%	2021	2.18%	2021
Pakistan	9.03%	2021	11.2%	2021	11.14%	2021
Panama	6.43%	2021	5.1%	2021	4.42%	2021
Peru	0.65%	2021	2.4%	2021	0.79%	2021
Philippines	1.73%	2021	6.1%	2021	0.90%	2021
Palau	9.49%	2021	4.0%	2021	3.14%	2021
Papua New Guinea	3.58%	2021	4.2%	2021	2.23%	2021
Poland	1.39%	2021	EU member		1.85%	2021
Portugal	1.39%	2021	EU member		1.58%	2021
Paraguay	4.49%	2021	9.6%	2021	4.77%	2021
Palestine	2.18%	2017			0.83%	2017
French Polynesia	5.75%	2021			6.76%	2021
Qatar	3.53%	2021	5.1%	2021	3.78%	2021
Romania	1.39%	2021	EU member		1.17%	2021
Russia	4.17%	2021	6.6%	2021	3.80%	2021
Rwanda	11.97%	2021	12.4%	2021	6.59%	2021
Saudi Arabia	5.4%	2022	6.3%	2021	5.20%	2020
Sudan	0.00%	2021	21.6%	2021	0.00%	2021
Senegal	8.88%	2021	12.1%	2021	9.34%	2021
Singapore	0.00%	2021	0.0%	2021	0.00%	2021
Solomon Islands	14.31%	2021	9.9%	2021	8.80%	2021
Sierra Leone	14.22%	2021	12.1%	2021	12.45%	2021
El Salvador	1.88%	2021	6.0%	2021	2.04%	2021
San Marino					0.69%	2021
Serbia	1.72%	2021	7.4%	2021	1.62%	2021
São Tomé and Príncipe	9.97%	2019	9.9%	2019	10.58%	2019
Suriname	8.43%	2021	10.4%	2021	7.43%	2021
Slovakia	1.39%	2021	EU member		1.51%	2021
Slovenia	1.39%	2021	EU member		1.91%	2021
Spain	1.39%	2021	EU member		1.73%	2021
Sweden	1.39%	2021	EU member		1.51%	2021
Switzerland	1.40%	2021	5.6%	2021	0.18%	2021
Eswatini	2.14%	2021	7.7%	2021	2.77%	2021
Seychelles	1.07%	2021	2.4%	2021	0.14%	2021
Syria	9.21%	2020	10.8%	2020	9.03%	2020
Chad	16.36%	2016			16.06%	2016
Togo	10.73%	2021	12.1%	2021	10.36%	2021
Thailand	3.15%	2021	11.5%	2021	2.07%	2021
Tajikistan	2.31%	2021	8.0%	2021	3.58%	2021
Turkmenistan	2.88%	2002			1.13%	2002
Timor-Leste	2.53%	2021	2.5%	2021	2.52%	2021
Tonga	6.59%	2021	10.7%	2021	8.30%	2021
Trinidad and Tobago	8.87%	2021	8.3%	2021	5.06%	2021
Tunisia	9.35%	2016			9.10%	2016
Turkey	3.22%	2021	10.7%	2021	1.69%	2021
Tuvalu	2.43%	2017			1.27%	2017
Taiwan			6.6%	2021	1.31%	2021
Tanzania	8.67%	2021	13.1%	2021	6.05%	2021
Uganda	8.67%	2021	17.6%	2021	6.04%	2021
Ukraine	1.86%	2022	4.4%	2021	1.87%	2021
Uruguay	5.25%	2021	10.3%	2021	6.64%	2021
United Kingdom	1.00%	2022	3.9%	2021	0.64%	2021
United States	1.49%	2022	3.3%	2024	1.48%	2021
Uzbekistan	2.56%	2021	7.4%	2021	2.36%	2021
Saint Vincent and the Grenadines	9.06%	2021	10.0%	2021	9.27%	2021
Venezuela	12.84%	2022	13.8%	2021	15.27%	2021
Vietnam	1.17%	2021	9.6%	2021	0.85%	2021
Vanuatu	11.08%	2021	9.2%	2021	9.31%	2021
Wallis and Futuna					2.09%	2021
Samoa	10.38%	2020	11.3%	2021	9.03%	2020
Yemen	5.03%	2017	7.6%	2017	5.97%	2017
South Africa	4.46%	2021	7.8%	2021	4.79%	2021
Zambia	4.81%	2021	14.6%	2021	4.78%	2021
Zimbabwe	11.37%	2021	17.9%	2021	10.08%	2021
Low & middle income economies (WB)	4.28%	2017				
Low-income economies (WB)	9.79%	2017				
Middle-income economies (WB)	—					
Upper middle income economies (WB)	3.70%	2017				
High-income economies (WB)	2.02%	2017				
European Union	1.39%	2021	5.2%	2021	1.49%	2021
Notes: WB: Weighted mean applied tariff is the average of effectively applied rates weighted by the product import shares corresponding to each partner country. Data are classified using the Harmonized System of trade at the six- or eight-digit level. Tariff line data were matched to Standard International Trade Classification (SITC) revision 3 codes to define commodity groups and import weights. To the extent possible, specific rates have been converted to their ad valorem equivalent rates and have been included in the calculation of weighted mean tariffs. Import weights were calculated using the United Nations Statistics Division's Commodity Trade (Comtrade) database. Effectively applied tariff rates at the six- and eight-digit product level are averaged for products in each commodity group. When the effectively applied rate is unavailable, the most favored nation rate is used instead. WTO: WTO indicators are based on MFN (Most Favoured Nation) tariffs applied by the reporting country/economy. Trade weighted average duty (Percent) means MFN applied tariff averages weighted with import flows for traded national tariff lines. UNCTAD: This table presents MFN (Most Favoured Nation) and effectively applied import tariff rates for major categories of non-agricultural and non-fuel products by individual country (as market economy) and economic grouping (as origin), expressed in various aggregation measures. Average tariff of a market country for an origin group (except for world) is calculated by taking those products (at HS 6-digit level) that are imported by the market country from each country included in the origin group. i.e., tariff rates for those products that are not traded are not included in the calculation. For world as origin, however, all products are taken into consideration regardless of trade. Product categories are defined in terms of SITC Revision 3 and all corresponding Harmonized System (HS) 6-digit codes have been aggregated for each category.

== See also ==
- List of countries by net goods exports
- List of sovereign states by current account balance
