= Carla Norrlöf =

Swedish-Ethiopian political scientist

Carla Norrlöf is a Swedish-Ethiopian political scientist. She is associate professor of Political Science at the University of Toronto. Her research focuses on hegemony, as well as the international political economy of trade, investment and security. Her 2010 book America's Global Advantage: US Hegemony and International Cooperation argues that US hegemony is durable because of its dominance in currency, trade and security. She also argues that the US does not buttress the international system out of altruism, but rather because it derives considerable concrete benefits in being the world's reserve currency, dominant military power, and primary supporter of international markets.

She was born in Addis Ababa, Ethiopia, but raised in Sweden. She has a B.A. in economic and M.A. in political science from Lund University, as well as a graduate diploma and a PhD in International Relations from the Geneva Graduate Institute.
