= List of countries by net goods exports =

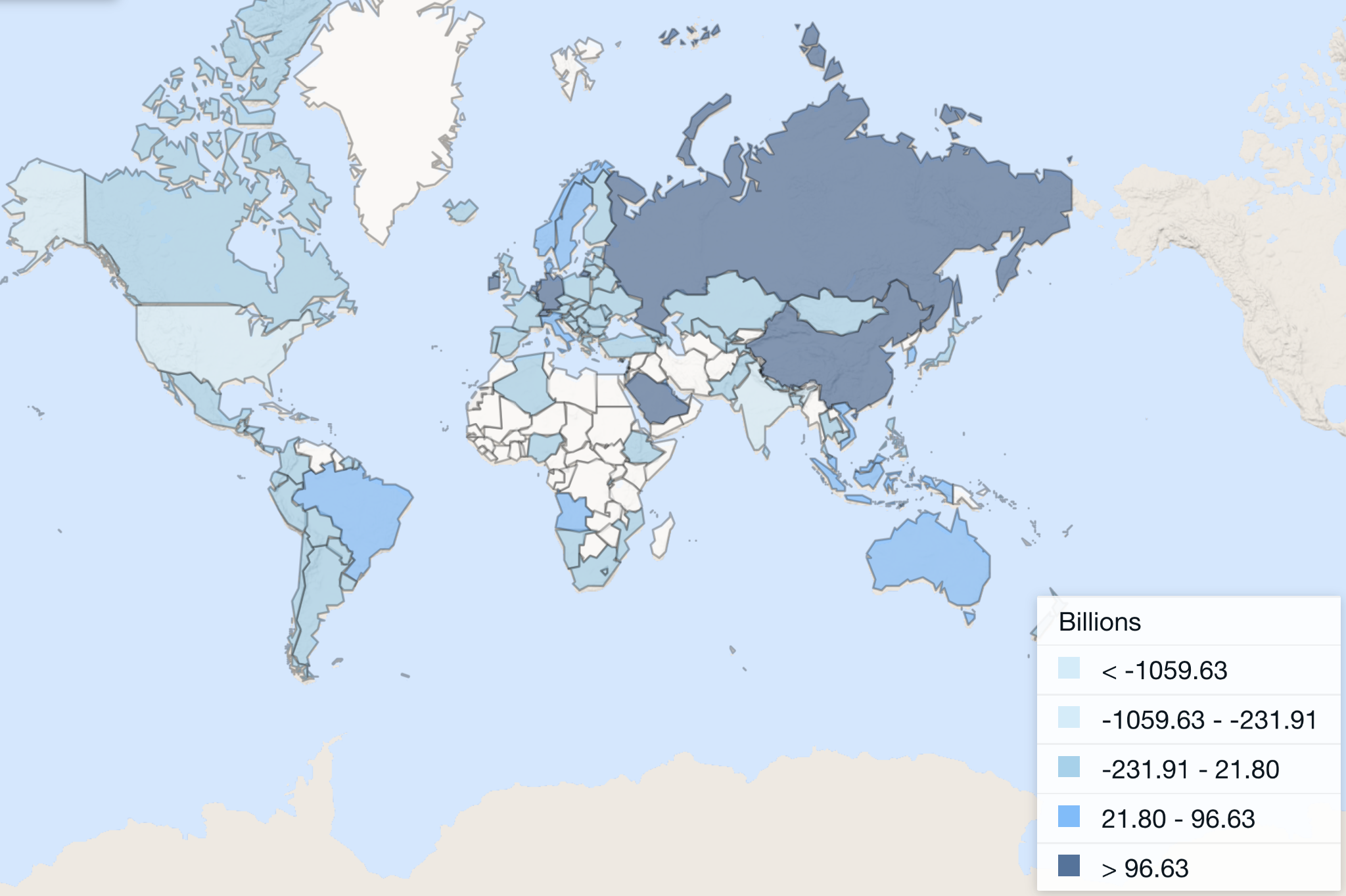
World map by net trade in goods (current US$), 2023, according to World Bank

This is a list of countries by net goods exports, also known as balance of trade, which is the difference between the monetary value of a nation's exports and imports over a certain time period. The list includes sovereign states and self-governing dependent territories based upon the ISO standard ISO 3166-1.

The following table shows the value of total annual merchandise exports and imports, expressed in millions of United States dollars (current prices), and the resulting trade balance, according to United Nations Conference on Trade and Development (UNCTAD), World Trade Organization (WTO), and World Bank (WB). Countries with positive balance of trade have a trade surplus, countries with negative net exports have a trade deficit.

== Lists ==
Sorting is alphabetical by country code, according to ISO 3166-1 alpha-3.

=== UNCTAD and WTO ===
Net goods exports (millions USD current prices)
Country/Territory Region/Group	UNCTAD (2023)			WTO (2023)		
Country/Territory Region/Group	Exports	Imports	Trade balance	Exports	Imports	Trade balance
(United Nations) WORLD	23783588.96	24234678.07	−451089.11	23783494.36	24234634.93	−451140.57
Aruba	147.18	1364.66	−1217.48	147.18	1364.66	−1217.48
Afghanistan	903.00	6064.00	−5161.00	903.00	6064.00	−5161.00
Angola	38351.20	16107.60	22243.60	38351.20	16107.60	22243.60
Anguilla	14.99	284.53	−269.54	14.99	284.53	−269.55
Albania	4324.44	8612.79	−4288.35	4324.44	8612.79	−4288.36
Andorra	252.37	1994.80	−1742.43	252.37	1994.80	−1742.43
United Arab Emirates	487778.00	448688.00	39090.00	487778.00	448688.00	39090.00
Argentina	66787.00	73715.00	−6928.00	66787.00	73715.00	−6928.00
Armenia	8415.20	12308.00	−3892.80	8415.20	12308.00	−3892.80
American Samoa	379.00	635.00	−256.00	379.00	635.00	−256.00
Antigua and Barbuda	26.74	902.32	−875.58	26.74	902.32	−875.58
Australia	370865.86	287739.76	83126.10	370865.86	287739.76	83126.09
Austria	223549.25	224542.64	−993.39	223549.25	224542.64	−993.39
Azerbaijan	33898.60	17285.30	16613.30	33898.60	17285.30	16613.30
Burundi	204.19	1151.47	−947.28	204.19	1151.47	−947.28
Belgium	562438.96	546764.75	15674.21	562438.96	546764.75	15674.20
Benin	4070.53	4233.68	−163.15	4070.53	4233.68	−163.15
Caribbean Netherlands	1.20	112.45	−111.25	1.20	112.45	−111.24
Burkina Faso	4308.93	5863.30	−1554.37	4308.93	5863.30	−1554.37
Bangladesh	55787.86	66862.60	−11074.74	55787.86	66862.60	−11074.74
Bulgaria	47854.31	53551.30	−5696.99	47854.31	53551.30	−5696.99
Bahrain	25235.11	15366.85	9868.26	25235.11	15366.85	9868.26
Bahamas	707.61	4187.52	−3479.91	707.61	4187.52	−3479.91
Bosnia and Herzegovina	9232.38	15355.39	−6123.01	9232.38	15355.39	−6123.02
Belarus	40168.20	43256.30	−3088.10	40168.20	43256.30	−3088.10
Belize	488.07	1340.58	−852.51	488.07	1340.58	−852.51
Bermuda	27.43	1189.44	−1162.01	27.43	1189.45	−1162.01
Bolivia	11018.35	11120.20	−101.85	11018.35	11120.20	−101.85
Brazil	339695.77	252710.46	86985.31	339695.77	252710.46	86985.31
Barbados	486.08	2092.25	−1606.17	486.08	2092.25	−1606.16
Brunei	9090.34	6316.59	2773.75	9090.35	6316.59	2773.75
Bhutan	794.85	1399.30	−604.45	794.85	1399.30	−604.45
Botswana	5423.74	6391.79	−968.05	5423.74	6391.79	−968.05
Central African Republic	136.72	501.58	−364.86	136.72	501.59	−364.87
Canada	569257.11	570418.95	−1161.84	569257.11	570418.95	−1161.83
Switzerland	420170.01	364098.45	56071.56	420170.01	364098.45	56071.56
Chile	94937.00	85506.00	9431.00	94937.00	85506.00	9431.00
China	3380024.50	2556801.80	823222.70	3380024.48	2556801.82	823222.66
Ivory Coast	20263.41	18886.96	1376.45	20263.41	18886.96	1376.46
Cameroon	4400.00	9000.00	−4600.00	4400.00	9000.00	−4600.00
Democratic Republic of the Congo	16400.00	11600.00	4800.00	16400.00	11600.00	4800.00
Republic of the Congo	5970.00	3950.00	2020.00	5970.00	3950.00	2020.00
Cook Islands	6.57	173.49	−166.92	6.57	173.49	−166.92
Colombia	49544.90	62796.64	−13251.74	49544.90	62796.64	−13251.73
Comoros	30.64	374.67	−344.03	30.64	374.67	−344.03
Cape Verde	54.47	980.45	−925.98	54.47	980.45	−925.99
Costa Rica	19025.19	24039.27	−5014.08	19025.19	24039.27	−5014.08
Cuba	1939.00	8919.60	−6980.60	1939.00	8919.60	−6980.60
Curaçao	533.25	1836.11	−1302.86	533.25	1836.11	−1302.86
Cayman Islands	36.55	2682.94	−2646.39	36.55	2682.94	−2646.39
Cyprus	4453.35	13987.31	−9533.96	4453.35	13987.31	−9533.96
Czech Republic	255450.48	230599.06	24851.42	255450.48	230599.06	24851.43
Germany	1688419.20	1462601.70	225817.50	1688419.22	1462601.75	225817.48
Djibouti	5001.60	4662.80	338.80	5001.60	4662.80	338.80
Dominica	15.29	298.42	−283.13	15.29	298.42	−283.13
Denmark	136630.58	126652.97	9977.61	136630.58	126652.97	9977.61
Dominican Republic	12935.30	28705.60	−15770.30	12935.30	28705.60	−15770.30
Algeria	51798.74	41848.95	9949.79	51798.74	41848.95	9949.80
Ecuador	31126.42	30898.16	228.26	31126.42	30898.16	228.26
Egypt	39852.85	78895.06	−39042.21	39852.85	78895.06	−39042.21
Eritrea	495.20	524.00	−28.80	495.20	524.00	−28.80
Spain	423220.67	470328.24	−47107.57	423220.67	470328.24	−47107.58
Estonia	19668.72	22963.19	−3294.47	19668.72	22963.19	−3294.48
Ethiopia	3616.30	17888.38	−14272.08	3616.30	17888.38	−14272.08
Finland	82355.46	82344.73	10.73	82355.46	82344.73	10.73
Fiji	1016.71	3117.90	−2101.19	1016.71	3117.90	−2101.19
Falkland Islands	327.67	190.85	136.82			
France	683480.73	792884.38	−137403.65	648480.73	785884.38	−137403.65
Faroe Islands	1853.07	1706.13	146.94			
Federated States of Micronesia	106.00	301.00	−195.00	106.00	301.00	−195.00
Gabon	7700.00	6100.00	1600.00	7700.00	6100.00	1600.00
United Kingdom	520690.64	791301.98	−270611.34	520690.64	791301.98	−270611.33
Georgia	6090.60	15514.00	−9423.40	6090.60	15514.00	−9423.40
Ghana	15868.32	13714.75	2153.57	15868.32	13714.75	2153.57
Gibraltar	320.00	1130.00	−810.00			
Guinea	9635.86	4696.46	4939.40	9635.86	4696.46	4939.40
Gambia	39.85	784.34	−744.49	39.85	784.34	−744.49
Guinea-Bissau	232.54	588.35	−355.81	232.55	588.35	−355.81
Equatorial Guinea	5200.00	3100.00	2100.00	5200.00	3100.00	2100.00
Greece	55047.35	88617.39	−33570.04	55047.35	88617.39	−33570.04
Grenada	46.05	608.76	−562.71	46.06	608.76	−562.70
Greenland	908.14	905.29	2.85	908.14	905.29	2.85
Guatemala	14198.72	30317.94	−16119.22	14198.72	30317.94	−16119.23
Guam	22.70	1305.00	−1282.30	22.70	1305.00	−1282.30
Guyana	13058.50	6478.20	6580.30	13058.50	6478.20	6580.30
Hong Kong	573871.01	653696.23	−79825.22	573871.01	653696.23	−79825.21
Honduras	11376.40	17525.20	−6148.80	11376.40	17525.20	−6148.80
Croatia	24894.27	43180.62	−18286.35	24894.27	43180.62	−18286.36
Haiti	896.41	3996.33	−3099.92	896.41	3996.33	−3099.92
Hungary	160954.78	155966.27	4988.51	160954.78	155966.27	4988.51
Indonesia	258857.34	221886.20	36971.14	258857.34	221886.20	36971.14
India	432000.87	672667.28	−240666.41	432000.87	672667.28	−240666.41
Ireland	209498.76	147065.16	62433.60	209498.76	147065.16	62433.61
Iran	91188.16	65276.24	25911.92	91188.16	65276.24	25911.92
Iraq	115952.00	95518.92	20433.08	115952.00	95518.92	20433.08
Iceland	6609.48	9464.07	−2854.59	6609.48	9464.07	−2854.59
Israel	66892.70	91283.82	−24391.12	66892.70	91283.82	−24391.12
Italy	676963.33	639630.14	37333.19	676963.33	639630.14	37333.19
Jamaica	2107.16	7857.80	−5750.64	2107.17	7857.80	−5750.64
Jordan	12762.93	25469.97	−12707.04	12762.93	25469.97	−12707.04
Japan	717315.07	785614.67	−68299.60	717315.07	785614.67	−68299.59
Kazakhstan	78532.90	60654.84	17878.06	78532.90	60654.84	17878.06
Kenya	7192.53	18590.58	−11398.05	7192.53	18590.58	−11398.05
Kyrgyzstan	3308.90	12352.00	−9043.10	3308.90	12352.00	−9043.10
Cambodia	23469.81	24386.09	−916.28	23469.81	24386.09	−916.28
Kiribati	8.00	96.00	−88.00	8.00	96.00	−88.00
Saint Kitts and Nevis	24.46	316.98	−292.52	24.46	316.98	−292.52
South Korea	632225.82	642572.13	−10346.31	632225.82	642572.13	−10346.30
Kuwait	85408.60	37378.02	48030.58	85408.60	37378.02	48030.58
Laos	8370.58	7710.87	659.71	8370.58	7710.87	659.71
Lebanon	3082.62	15286.15	−12203.53	3082.62	15286.15	−12203.53
Liberia	1100.00	1700.00	−600.00	1100.00	1700.00	−600.00
Libya	35270.00	20522.50	14747.50	35270.00	20522.50	14747.50
Saint Lucia	76.88	935.65	−858.77	76.88	935.65	−858.77
Sri Lanka	11910.70	16811.20	−4900.50	11910.70	16811.20	−4900.50
Lesotho	793.95	1772.06	−978.11	793.95	1772.06	−978.11
Lithuania	42639.16	48435.96	−5796.80	42639.16	48435.96	−5796.81
Luxembourg	17147.89	25535.22	−8387.33	17147.89	25535.22	−8387.33
Latvia	22446.03	27114.40	−4668.37	22446.03	27114.40	−4668.37
Macau	1654.34	17541.15	−15886.81	1654.34	17541.15	−15886.81
Morocco	41641.75	68632.00	−26990.25	41641.75	68632.00	−26990.25
Moldova	4048.60	8673.70	−4625.10	4048.60	8673.70	−4625.10
Madagascar	3213.01	4749.94	−1536.93	3213.01	4749.94	−1536.93
Maldives	421.39	3497.16	−3075.77	421.39	3497.16	−3075.77
Mexico	593011.65	621476.40	−28464.75	593011.65	621476.40	−28464.76
Marshall Islands	58.82	103.49	−44.67	58.82	103.49	−44.67
North Macedonia	8999.20	12055.58	−3056.38	8999.20	12055.58	−3056.38
Mali	5320.78	8364.14	−3043.36	5320.79	8364.14	−3043.35
Malta	3468.48	8105.36	−4636.88	3468.48	8105.36	−4636.88
Myanmar	13593.50	15565.50	−1972.00	13593.50	15565.50	−1972.00
Montenegro	679.46	4118.11	−3438.65	679.46	4118.11	−3438.65
Mongolia	15184.50	9252.50	5932.00	15184.50	9252.50	5932.00
Northern Mariana Islands	4.61	556.26	−551.65	4.61	556.26	−551.64
Mozambique	8276.43	10097.58	−1821.15	8276.43	10097.58	−1821.15
Mauritania	4017.36	5242.32	−1224.96	4017.36	5242.32	−1224.97
Montserrat	5.54	40.06	−34.52	5.54	40.06	−34.52
Mauritius	2299.56	6283.70	−3984.14	2299.56	6283.70	−3984.14
Malawi	880.00	1560.00	−680.00	880.00	1560.00	−680.00
Malaysia	312845.96	265755.14	47090.82	312845.96	265755.14	47090.81
Namibia	5930.00	7090.00	−1160.00	5930.00	7090.00	−1160.00
New Caledonia	2130.71	3195.80	−1065.09	2130.71	3195.80	−1065.09
Niger	1097.49	2287.29	−1189.80	1097.49	2287.29	−1189.80
Nigeria	57890.26	45946.35	11943.91	57890.26	45946.35	11943.90
Nicaragua	7378.49	10916.35	−3537.86	7378.49	10916.35	−3537.86
Niue	0.84	7.45	−6.61	0.84	7.45	−6.62
Netherlands	731800.92	639800.42	92516.50	731800.92	639800.42	92516.50
Norway	173906.06	95292.36	78613.70	173906.06	95292.36	78613.70
Nepal	1014.54	12475.70	−11461.16	1014.54	12475.70	−11461.16
Nauru	44.32	78.69	−34.37	44.32	78.69	−34.37
New Zealand	41482.93	49997.07	−8514.14	41482.93	49997.07	−8514.15
Oman	62736.00	36382.00	26354.00	62736.00	36382.00	26354.00
Pakistan	28488.00	50500.00	−22012.00	28488.00	50500.00	−22012.00
Panama	15712.83	35094.92	−19382.09	15712.83	35094.92	−19382.09
Peru	60755.63	52305.51	8450.12	60755.63	52305.51	8450.12
Philippines	72917.90	132978.95	−60061.05	72917.90	132978.95	−60061.05
Palau	1.85	242.27	−240.42	1.85	242.27	−240.42
Papua New Guinea	12036.36	3018.83	9017.53	12036.36	3018.83	9017.53
Poland	381517.24	370076.24	11441.00	381517.24	370076.24	11441.00
North Korea	347.00	2726.00	−2379.00	347.00	2726.00	−2379.00
Portugal	83901.15	113475.32	−29574.17	83901.15	113475.32	−29574.17
Paraguay	11890.54	16104.64	−4214.10	11890.54	16104.64	−4214.11
Palestine	1455.77	8569.94	−7114.17			
French Polynesia	184.12	2406.96	−2222.84	184.12	2406.96	−2222.84
Qatar	97365.24	30927.87	66437.37	97365.24	30927.87	66437.37
Romania	100611.79	131912.43	−31300.64	100611.79	131912.43	−31300.65
Russia	423915.00	303786.00	120129.00	423915.00	303786.00	120129.00
Rwanda	2478.75	3896.86	−1418.11	2478.75	3896.86	−1418.11
Saudi Arabia	322255.55	211028.26	111227.29	322255.55	211028.26	111227.30
Sudan	4780.00	7100.00	−2320.00	4780.00	7100.00	−2320.00
Senegal	5312.72	11064.08	−5751.36	5312.72	11064.08	−5751.36
Singapore	476251.52	423447.91	52803.61	476251.52	423447.91	52803.61
Saint Helena, Ascension and Tristan da Cunha	94.57	43.18	51.39			
Solomon Islands	427.07	731.60	−304.53	427.07	731.60	−304.53
Sierra Leone	1270.20	2154.07	−883.87	1270.20	2154.07	−883.87
El Salvador	6498.09	15648.34	−9150.25	6498.09	15648.34	−9150.25
San Marino						
Somalia	940.00	1230.00	−290.00			
Saint Pierre and Miquelon	1.06	108.69	−107.63	1.06	108.69	−107.63
Serbia	30934.76	39837.66	−8902.90	30934.76	39837.66	−8902.90
South Sudan	833.23	1183.63	−350.40	833.23	1183.63	−350.40
São Tomé and Príncipe	19.96	185.75	−165.79	19.96	185.75	−165.79
Suriname	2498.26	1821.96	676.30	2498.26	1821.96	676.30
Slovakia	117315.54	113531.68	3783.86	117315.54	113531.68	3783.86
Slovenia	73033.63	71444.66	1588.97	73033.63	71444.66	1588.98
Sweden	197859.72	193015.65	4844.07	197859.72	193015.65	4844.07
Eswatini	1762.15	1925.22	−163.07	1762.15	1925.22	−163.07
Sint Maarten	299.79	1341.14	−1041.35	299.79	1341.14	−1041.36
Seychelles	541.48	1430.83	−889.35	541.48	1430.83	−889.36
Syria	5470.00	7300.00	−1830.00	5470.00	7300.00	−1830.00
Turks and Caicos Islands	4.37	440.10	−435.73	4.37	440.10	−435.73
Chad	3700.00	2200.00	1500.00	3700.00	2200.00	1500.00
Togo	1433.99	3203.67	−1769.68	1433.99	3203.67	−1769.68
Thailand	284561.80	289754.28	−5192.48	284561.80	289754.28	−5192.48
Tajikistan	1717.70	5747.80	−4030.10	1717.70	5747.80	−4030.10
Tokelau	0.19	0.04	0.15	0.19	0.04	0.15
Turkmenistan	9917.00	3481.70	6435.30	9917.00	3481.70	6435.30
Timor-Leste	294.93	893.86	−598.93	294.93	893.86	−598.93
Tonga	9.16	265.39	−256.23	9.16	265.39	−256.23
Trinidad and Tobago	8925.40	7269.60	1655.80	8925.40	7269.60	1655.80
Tunisia	19985.40	25484.59	−5499.19	19985.40	25484.59	−5499.18
Turkey	255777.40	361774.04	−105996.64	255777.40	361774.04	−105996.64
Tuvalu	0.04	24.69	−24.65	0.04	24.69	−24.66
Taiwan	432336.54	358959.70	73376.84	432336.54	358959.70	73376.85
Tanzania	7291.52	13817.30	−6525.78	7291.52	13817.30	−6525.78
Uganda	6162.15	12158.59	−5996.44	6162.15	12158.59	−5996.44
Ukraine	36040.00	63527.00	−27487.00	36040.00	63527.00	−27487.00
Uruguay	9192.92	12486.20	−3293.28	9192.92	12486.20	−3293.28
United States	2019542.00	3172514.30	−1152972.30	2019541.97	3172514.27	−1152972.30
Uzbekistan	20044.68	36780.75	−16736.07	20044.68	36780.76	−16736.08
Saint Vincent and the Grenadines	42.78	413.86	−371.08	42.78	413.86	−371.08
Venezuela	8470.00	11180.00	−2710.00	8470.00	11180.00	−2710.00
British Virgin Islands	21.40	310.60	−289.20			
Vietnam	353781.83	325776.17	28005.66	353781.83	325776.17	28005.66
Vanuatu	62.70	455.17	−392.47	62.70	455.17	−392.47
Wallis and Futuna	0.15	78.92	−78.77	0.15	78.92	−78.77
Samoa	42.42	468.08	−425.66	42.42	468.08	−425.65
Kosovo						
Yemen	226.00	5031.00	−4805.00	226.00	5031.00	−4805.00
South Africa	110855.34	130747.04	−19891.70	110855.34	130747.04	−19891.70
Zambia	9651.80	9323.61	328.19	9651.80	9323.61	328.19
Zimbabwe	7225.20	9214.00	−1988.80	7225.20	9214.00	−1988.80
Developed economies	13295050.54	14405932.67	−1110882.13			
Developed economies: Americas	2589735.75	3745136.68	−115540093			
Developed economies: Asia	1416433.60	1519470.62	−103037.02			
Developed economies: Europe	8876532.41	8803588.53	72943.88			
Developed economies: Oceania	412348.78	337736.84	74611.94			
Developing economies	10488538.42	9828745.41	659793.01			
Developing economies: Africa	598316.66	691045.45	−9272879			
Developing economies: Americas	1396285.84	1448590.12	−5230428			
Developing economies: Asia	8477393.58	7671847.82	805545.76			
Developing economies: Oceania	16542.34	17262.02	−719.68			
Developing economies excluding China	7108513.92	7271943.61	−163429.69			
Developing economies excluding LDCs	10231654.94	9511240.35	720414.59			
LDCs (Least developed countries)	256883.48	317505.05	−60621.57			
LDCs: Africa	151046.30	171707.10	−20660.80			
LDCs: Asia	104160.14	139495.06	−35334.92			
LDCs: Islands and Haiti	1677.04	6302.89	−4625.85			
LLDCs (Landlocked Developing Countries)	271654.50	319148.80	−47494.30			
SIDS (Small Island Developing States) (UN-OHRLLS)	567289.32	555980.07	11309.25			
SIDS: Atlantic and Indian Ocean	28862.58	29897.21	−1034.63			
SIDS: Caribbean	45338.29	84558.03	−39219.74			
SIDS: Pacific	493088.45	441524.83	51563.62			
Low-income developing economies (UN)	152598.84	251208.67	−98609.83			
Middle-income developing economies (UN)	1964337.58	2340388.21	−376050.63			
Lower middle income						
Upper middle income						
High-income developing economies (UN)	8370771.08	7234219.39	1136551.69			
BRICS	4686491.47	3916712.58	769778.89			
European Union	7194388.75	7039378.21	155010.54	7194389.54	7039380.00	155009.54
G20 (Group of Twenty)	18207465.67	18696132.47	−488666.80			
G77 (Group of 77)	8511277.92	7660415.80	850862.12			
OECD (Organisation for Economic Cooperation and Development)	13564360.38	14804531.09	−1240170.71			
Note: Goods exports/imports refer to all movable goods (including nonmonetary gold and net exports/imports of goods under merchanting) involved in a change of ownership from residents to nonresidents. Trade in services is not included.

=== World Bank ===
Net goods exports (millions USD current prices, World Bank)
Country/Territory/Region/Group	Exports	Year	Imports	Year	Trade balance	Year
(United Nations) WORLD	23313514.50	2023	22948570.84	2023	364943.67	2023
Aruba	205.27	2022	1370.75	2022	−1165.47	2022
Afghanistan	776.73	2020	5877.64	2020	−5100.91	2020
Angola	36884.70	2023	15084.85	2023	21799.85	2023
Anguilla						
Albania	1984.34	2023	6895.97	2023	−4911.62	2023
Andorra	198.65	2022	1784.38	2022	−1585.73	2022
United Arab Emirates						
Argentina	66836.26	2023	69773.05	2023	−2936.80	2023
Armenia	8511.01	2023	10945.67	2023	−2434.66	2023
American Samoa						
Antigua and Barbuda	94.31	2023	745.67	2023	−651.36	2023
Australia	372159.00	2023	288705.81	2023	83453.19	2023
Austria	216779.82	2023	206757.60	2023	10022.22	2023
Azerbaijan	29202.11	2023	16396.55	2023	12805.56	2023
Burundi	180.19	2018	676.11	2018	−495.92	2018
Belgium	388897.12	2023	392493.92	2023	−3596.80	2023
Benin	3719.07	2022	4355.76	2022	−636.68	2022
Caribbean Netherlands						
Burkina Faso	5310.11	2022	5316.33	2022	−6.22	2022
Bangladesh	52506.39	2023	62158.52	2023	−9652.13	2023
Bulgaria	46844.28	2023	50763.78	2023	−3919.50	2023
Bahrain	24813.56	2023	20310.90	2023	4502.66	2023
Bahamas	837.73	2022	3747.52	2022	−2909.78	2022
Bosnia and Herzegovina	8660.15	2023	14300.51	2023	−5640.36	2023
Belarus	39366.20	2023	41722.50	2023	−2356.30	2023
Belize	488.07	2023	1265.42	2023	−777.34	2023
Bermuda	9.15	2021	1085.10	2021	−1075.95	2021
Bolivia	10778.14	2023	10607.46	2023	170.68	2023
Brazil	344431.72	2023	263849.35	2023	80582.37	2023
Barbados	705.06	2017	1525.91	2017	−820.85	2017
Brunei	14129.52	2022	8976.82	2022	5152.70	2022
Bhutan	686.91	2023	1431.79	2023	−744.87	2023
Botswana	8312.50	2022	7756.80	2022	555.70	2022
Central African Republic	145.89	1994	130.58	1994	15.31	1994
Canada	569147.01	2023	570607.45	2023	−1460.44	2023
Switzerland	492699.00	2023	361946.76	2023	130752.24	2023
Chile	94557.42	2023	79233.99	2023	15323.43	2023
China	3179192.96	2023	2585296.49	2023	593896.47	2023
Ivory Coast	16297.63	2022	15223.03	2022	1074.60	2022
Cameroon	6924.25	2022	7216.86	2022	−292.62	2022
Democratic Republic of the Congo	22185.26	2021	18245.39	2021	3939.87	2021
Republic of the Congo	7511.58	2021	2779.38	2021	4732.19	2021
Cook Islands						
Colombia	52505.83	2023	59373.30	2023	−6867.47	2023
Comoros	55.50	2022	271.90	2022	−216.39	2022
Cape Verde	256.54	2023	1148.34	2023	−891.80	2023
Costa Rica	18856.84	2023	22101.64	2023	−3244.80	2023
Cuba						
Curaçao	553.13	2022	2023.01	2022	−1469.88	2022
Cayman Islands	698.45	2021	1387.21	2021	−688.75	2021
Cyprus	4698.96	2023	12388.88	2023	−7689.92	2023
Czech Republic	196981.61	2023	183906.40	2023	13075.22	2023
Germany	1664307.25	2023	1418986.36	2023	245320.89	2023
Djibouti	4600.90	2022	4327.52	2022	273.37	2022
Dominica	23.18	2023	265.49	2023	−242.31	2023
Denmark	164535.24	2023	133442.93	2023	31092.31	2023
Dominican Republic	12931.90	2023	28823.10	2023	−15891.20	2023
Algeria	54985.40	2023	42851.91	2023	12133.49	2023
Ecuador	31483.91	2023	29273.73	2023	2210.18	2023
Egypt	44721.80	2022	71745.41	2022	−27023.61	2022
Eritrea	36.81	2000	471.26	2000	−434.46	2000
Spain	417704.80	2023	453162.44	2023	−35457.64	2023
Estonia	19322.19	2023	21901.26	2023	−2579.08	2023
Ethiopia	3469.62	2023	15318.23	2023	−11848.62	2023
Finland	89122.86	2023	80481.63	2023	8641.23	2023
Fiji	1047.53	2022	2679.56	2022	−1632.03	2022
Falkland Islands						
France	691516.12	2023	779023.85	2023	−87507.73	2023
Faroe Islands	1005.99	2011	949.03	2011	56.97	2011
Federated States of Micronesia	88.09	2014	154.45	2014	−66.36	2014
Gabon	5112.62	2015	3171.35	2015	1941.27	2015
United Kingdom	490566.54	2023	722479.16	2023	−231912.62	2023
Georgia	8110.82	2023	14203.55	2023	−6092.73	2023
Ghana	17494.36	2022	14621.23	2022	2873.13	2022
Gibraltar						
Guinea	8752.57	2022	4842.50	2022	3910.07	2022
Gambia	51.62	2022	693.99	2022	−642.38	2022
Guinea-Bissau	245.15	2022	398.81	2022	−153.66	2022
Equatorial Guinea	175.31	1996	292.04	1996	−116.73	1996
Greece	53464.65	2023	88499.81	2023	−35035.16	2023
Grenada	111.20	2023	707.15	2023	−595.95	2023
Greenland						
Guatemala	13035.27	2023	27364.05	2023	−14328.79	2023
Guam						
Guyana	11299.45	2022	3204.47	2022	8094.98	2022
Hong Kong	574430.87	2023	590797.79	2023	−16366.93	2023
Honduras	5985.15	2023	14412.52	2023	−8427.37	2023
Croatia	20753.75	2023	39470.78	2023	−18717.02	2023
Haiti	1253.86	2022	4761.86	2022	−3508.01	2022
Hungary	136377.82	2023	136085.13	2023	292.69	2023
Indonesia	259513.83	2023	213061.02	2023	46452.82	2023
India	435682.38	2023	681100.57	2023	−245418.19	2023
Ireland	334222.91	2023	159508.14	2023	174714.77	2023
Iran	28345.00	2000	15207.00	2000	13138.00	2000
Iraq	118044.80	2022	46914.80	2022	71130.00	2022
Iceland	6843.87	2023	8960.09	2023	−2116.22	2023
Israel	73471.50	2023	93152.90	2023	−19681.40	2023
Italy	645564.81	2023	599949.05	2023	45615.77	2023
Jamaica	1901.51	2022	6509.54	2022	−4608.03	2022
Jordan	12380.28	2022	24275.33	2022	−11895.05	2022
Japan	713824.21	2023	761680.54	2023	−47856.34	2023
Kazakhstan	79879.44	2023	59711.04	2023	20168.40	2023
Kenya	7418.91	2022	19122.85	2022	−11703.94	2022
Kyrgyzstan	2253.35	2022	9172.07	2022	−6918.73	2022
Cambodia	23564.39	2023	26550.64	2023	−2986.24	2023
Kiribati	8.65	2022	177.02	2022	−168.37	2022
Saint Kitts and Nevis	30.81	2023	420.68	2023	−389.87	2023
South Korea	645048.10	2023	610955.70	2023	34092.40	2023
Kuwait	84174.00	2023	33028.05	2023	51145.95	2023
Laos	8198.25	2022	7244.14	2022	954.11	2022
Lebanon	3848.56	2023	16686.89	2023	−12838.32	2023
Liberia	1028.44	2022	1527.82	2022	−499.38	2022
Libya	32297.00	2021	16957.20	2021	15339.80	2021
Saint Lucia	140.36	2023	798.36	2023	−658.01	2023
Sri Lanka	11910.71	2023	16811.13	2023	−4900.42	2023
Lesotho	870.58	2023	1645.26	2023	−774.68	2023
Lithuania	39295.55	2023	44507.85	2023	−5212.29	2023
Luxembourg	27452.91	2023	27650.97	2023	−198.07	2023
Latvia	19817.53	2023	23860.92	2023	−4043.39	2023
Macau	7875.17	2022	17570.93	2022	−9695.76	2022
Morocco	36574.76	2022	63037.15	2022	−26462.40	2022
Moldova	3425.50	2023	8313.30	2023	−4887.80	2023
Madagascar	3547.07	2022	4516.89	2022	−969.82	2022
Maldives	399.74	2022	3315.58	2022	−2915.83	2022
Mexico	593579.85	2023	599122.28	2023	−5542.43	2023
Marshall Islands	120.57	2021	132.88	2021	−12.31	2021
North Macedonia	7882.93	2023	10669.64	2023	−2786.71	2023
Mali	5376.43	2022	5592.40	2022	−215.96	2022
Malta	3818.34	2022	7415.18	2022	−3596.83	2022
Myanmar	10840.84	2019	13691.17	2019	−2850.33	2019
Montenegro	773.60	2023	4004.60	2023	−3231.00	2023
Mongolia	13914.30	2023	9365.64	2023	4548.65	2023
Northern Mariana Islands						
Mozambique	8276.43	2023	9179.62	2023	−903.19	2023
Mauritania	3824.93	2022	4826.56	2022	−1001.62	2022
Montserrat						
Mauritius	2299.57	2023	5906.35	2023	−3606.79	2023
Malawi	1022.78	2022	3027.13	2022	−2004.35	2022
Malaysia	231428.96	2023	201468.72	2023	29960.24	2023
Namibia	4645.65	2023	6286.00	2023	−1640.35	2023
New Caledonia	1335.17	2016	2267.07	2016	−931.90	2016
Niger	1046.19	2022	2921.64	2022	−1875.45	2022
Nigeria	55820.81	2023	47745.80	2023	8075.02	2023
Nicaragua	6688.30	2023	9380.20	2023	−2691.90	2023
Niue						
Netherlands	718939.22	2023	622305.12	2023	96634.10	2023
Norway	176536.54	2023	96025.70	2023	80510.84	2023
Nepal	1359.06	2023	11823.62	2023	−10464.57	2023
Nauru	11.86	2018	60.58	2018	−48.72	2018
New Zealand	42545.82	2023	49971.59	2023	−7425.77	2023
Oman	66063.61	2022	34747.05	2022	31316.56	2022
Pakistan	28930.00	2023	48350.00	2023	−19420.00	2023
Panama	19095.55	2023	30180.82	2023	−11085.27	2023
Peru	67518.11	2023	49840.11	2023	17677.99	2023
Philippines	55316.17	2023	121104.02	2023	−65787.84	2023
Palau	2.10	2022	158.53	2022	−156.43	2022
Papua New Guinea	11446.28	2021	4281.28	2021	7165.00	2021
Poland	361247.00	2023	354542.00	2023	6705.00	2023
North Korea						
Portugal	80637.48	2023	107394.80	2023	−26757.32	2023
Paraguay	16255.58	2023	15430.69	2023	824.89	2023
Palestine	2610.93	2022	10157.47	2022	−7546.54	2022
French Polynesia	177.87	2016	1487.74	2016	−1309.87	2016
Qatar	97751.65	2023	29428.57	2023	68323.08	2023
Romania	93586.41	2023	124945.25	2023	−31358.84	2023
Russia	424223.08	2023	303297.41	2023	120925.67	2023
Rwanda	2465.95	2023	4834.71	2023	−2368.76	2023
Saudi Arabia	322461.89	2023	195554.15	2023	126907.75	2023
Sudan	4357.42	2022	9985.36	2022	−5627.95	2022
Senegal	5490.57	2021	8488.55	2021	−2997.98	2021
Singapore	545938.49	2023	391156.64	2023	154781.84	2023
Saint Helena, Ascension and Tristan da Cunha						
Solomon Islands	430.77	2023	629.46	2023	−198.69	2023
Sierra Leone	1154.36	2022	1748.83	2022	−594.47	2022
El Salvador	5520.61	2023	14385.34	2023	−8864.73	2023
San Marino	2532.64	2021	2133.73	2021	398.92	2021
Somalia						
Saint Pierre and Miquelon						
Serbia	30199.25	2023	37332.91	2023	−7133.66	2023
South Sudan	4968.59	2022	4041.74	2022	926.85	2022
São Tomé and Príncipe	21.86	2022	164.74	2022	−142.88	2022
Suriname	2359.66	2023	1572.16	2023	787.50	2023
Slovakia	108673.65	2023	106946.39	2023	1727.26	2023
Slovenia	44670.01	2023	44166.76	2023	503.25	2023
Sweden	219946.99	2023	189644.93	2023	30302.06	2023
Eswatini	2029.83	2022	1969.82	2022	60.01	2022
Sint Maarten	207.94	2022	1082.92	2022	−874.98	2022
Seychelles	541.95	2023	1427.12	2023	−885.17	2023
Syria	12272.75	2010	15875.73	2010	−3602.98	2010
Turks and Caicos Islands	5.80	2018	469.81	2018	−464.01	2018
Chad	135.30	1994	212.06	1994	−76.76	1994
Togo	1207.44	2020	1951.34	2020	−743.89	2020
Thailand	280209.00	2023	263237.02	2023	16971.98	2023
Tajikistan	1861.48	2023	5183.16	2023	−3321.68	2023
Tokelau						
Turkmenistan						
Timor-Leste	632.40	2023	781.46	2023	−149.07	2023
Tonga	15.20	2022	217.33	2022	−202.13	2022
Trinidad and Tobago	16687.11	2022	7506.17	2022	9180.95	2022
Tunisia	8648.11	2022	19289.74	2022	−10641.64	2022
Turkey	250830.00	2023	337719.00	2023	−86889.00	2023
Tuvalu	0.18	2022	24.24	2022	−24.06	2022
Taiwan						
Tanzania	7223.82	2022	14208.71	2022	−6984.89	2022
Uganda	4274.72	2022	7947.24	2022	−3672.52	2022
Ukraine	34678.00	2023	63473.00	2023	−28795.00	2023
Uruguay	15075.91	2023	12992.50	2023	2083.41	2023
United States	2052682.00	2023	3112315.00	2023	−1059633.00	2023
Uzbekistan	19418.80	2023	34475.56	2023	−15056.76	2023
Saint Vincent and the Grenadines	54.38	2023	401.66	2023	−347.29	2023
Venezuela	27399.00	2016	16338.00	2016	11061.00	2016
British Virgin Islands						
Vietnam	354671.00	2023	310708.00	2023	43963.00	2023
Vanuatu	73.61	2022	349.76	2022	−276.14	2022
Wallis and Futuna						
Samoa	43.37	2023	429.29	2023	−385.92	2023
Kosovo	941.41	2023	5914.62	2023	−4973.21	2023
Yemen	472.84	2016	6798.28	2016	−6325.44	2016
South Africa	110543.26	2023	104984.62	2023	5558.64	2023
Zambia	11504.78	2022	8136.94	2022	3367.84	2022
Zimbabwe	4931.86	2020	4719.67	2020	212.19	2020
Developed economies						
Developed economies: Americas						
Developed economies: Asia						
Developed economies: Europe						
Developed economies: Oceania						
Developing economies						
Developing economies: Africa						
Developing economies: Americas						
Developing economies: Asia						
Developing economies: Oceania						
Developing economies excluding China						
Developing economies excluding LDCs						
LDCs (Least developed countries)	284801.22	2022	366261.01	2022	−81459.80	2022
LDCs: Africa						
LDCs: Asia						
LDCs: Islands and Haiti						
LLDCs (Landlocked Developing Countries)						
SIDS (Small Island Developing States) (UN-OHRLLS)						
SIDS: Atlantic and Indian Ocean						
SIDS: Caribbean	17824.31	2022	15082.23	2022	2742.08	2022
SIDS: Pacific	1719.80	2022	4992.84	2022	−3273.03	2022
Low-income developing economies (UN)	86999.55	2021	152563.12	2022		
Middle-income developing economies (UN)	7514648.21	2023	7212266.52	2023	302381.69	2023
Lower middle income	1347512.50	2023	1766244.82	2023	−418732.32	2023
Upper middle income	6164283.04	2023	5433709.73	2023	730573.31	2023
High-income developing economies (UN)	15666690.60	2023	15572353.50	2023	94337.10	2023
BRICS						
European Union	6809196.86	2023	6409806.54	2023	399390.31	2023
G20 (Group of Twenty)						
G77 (Group of 77)						
OECD (Organisation for Economic Cooperation and Development)	13285331.08	2023	13949569.17	2023	−664238.10	2023
Note: Goods exports/imports refer to all movable goods (including nonmonetary gold and net exports/imports of goods under merchanting) involved in a change of ownership from residents to nonresidents. Trade in services is not included.
