= List of George W. Bush legislation and programs =

George W. Bush during his presidency of 8 years from 2001 to 2009 signed 56 signature pieces of legislation. Major ones of these included USA PATRIOT Act, Joint Resolution to Authorize the Use of United States Armed Forces Against Iraq, Job Creation and Worker Assistance Act of 2002, United States-Chile Free Trade Agreement Implementation Act, Controlling the Assault of Non-Solicited Pornography and Marketing Act, Foreign Investment and National Security Act of 2007. He vetoed the Food, Conservation, and Energy Act of 2008, Stem Cell Research Enhancement Act and 2 other pieces of legislation.

During his presidency America withdrew from the Anti-Ballistic Missile Treaty and the Kyoto Protocol. Some of the international treaties signed during Bush's presidency were SORT, Stockholm Convention on Persistent Organic Pollutants, International Cooperation on Computer Crimes among others.

== Legislation signed ==
=== 2001 ===
- June 7: Economic Growth and Tax Relief Reconciliation Act of 2001
- September 18: Authorization for Use of Military Force of 2001
- September 28: Jordan–United States Free Trade Agreement
- October 26: USA PATRIOT Act
- November 28: Internet Tax Nondiscrimination Act

=== 2002 ===
- January 8: No Child Left Behind Act
- March 9: Job Creation and Worker Assistance Act of 2002
- March 27: Bipartisan Campaign Reform Act of 2002
- May 13: Farm Security and Rural Investment Act of 2002
- May 14: Hematological Cancer Research Investment and Education Act
- May 14: Enhanced Border Security and Visa Entry Reform Act of 2002
- May 15: No-FEAR Act
- June 12: Public Health Security and Bioterrorism Preparedness and Response Act of 2002
- July 30: Sarbanes-Oxley Act of 2002
- August 2: American Service-Members' Protection Act
- August 5: Born-Alive Infants Protection Act
- October 16: Joint Resolution to Authorize the Use of United States Armed Forces Against Iraq
- October 29: Help America Vote Act
- November 6: Rare Diseases Act of 2002
- November 25: Homeland Security Act of 2002
- November 26: Terrorism Risk Insurance Act
- December 17: E-Government Act of 2002

=== 2003 ===
- March 11: Do-Not-Call Implementation Act
- April 25: Clean Diamond Trade Act
- April 30: PROTECT Act of 2003 (Prosecutorial Remedies and Other Tools to end the Exploitation of Children Today Act)
- May 27: United States Leadership Against HIV/AIDS, Tuberculosis and Malaria Act of 2003.
- May 28: Jobs and Growth Tax Relief Reconciliation Act of 2003
- September 3: Chile–United States Free Trade Agreement
- September 3: Singapore–United States Free Trade Agreement
- September 4: Prison Rape Elimination Act of 2003
- November 5: Partial-Birth Abortion Ban Act of 2003
- December 3: Healthy Forests Restoration Act of 2003
- December 4: Fair and Accurate Credit Transactions Act
- December 6: Fairness to Contact Lens Consumers Act
- December 8: Medicare Prescription Drug, Improvement, and Modernization Act of 2003
- December 16: American Dream Down Payment Act of 2003
- December 16: Controlling the Assault of Non-Solicited Pornography and Marketing Act (CAN-SPAM)

=== 2004 ===
- April 1: Unborn Victims of Violence Act (Laci and Conner’s Law)
- July 17: Morocco–United States Free Trade Agreement
- July 21: Project Bioshield Act
- August 3: Australia–United States Free Trade Agreement
- October 18: North Korean Human Rights Act of 2004
- October 20: Belarus Democracy Act of 2004
- October 22: American Jobs Creation Act of 2004
- December 3: IDEA 2004
- December 17: Intelligence Reform and Terrorism Prevention Act

=== 2005 ===
- February 18: Class Action Fairness Act of 2005
- April 20: Bankruptcy Reform Act of 2005
- April 27: Family Entertainment and Copyright Act
- May 11: Real ID Act
- July 29: Patient Safety and Quality Improvement Act
- August 2: Dominican Republic-Central America-United States Free Trade Agreement Implementation Act
- August 8: Energy Policy Act of 2005
- August 10: Safe, Accountable, Flexible, and Efficient Transportation Equity Act of 2005 (SAFETEA)
- October 26: Protection of Lawful Commerce in Arms Act

=== 2006 ===
- January 11: United States-Bahrain Free Trade Agreement Implementation Act
- February 8: Deficit Reduction Act of 2005
- March 9: USA PATRIOT Improvement and Reauthorization Act
- March 9: Combat Methamphetamine Epidemic Act of 2005
- July 24: Freedom to Display the American Flag Act of 2005
- July 27: Adam Walsh Child Protection and Safety Act
- August 17: The Pension Protection Act of 2006
- September 26: Federal Funding Accountability and Transparency Act of 2006
- September 26: Oman–United States Free Trade Agreement
- September 30: Iran Freedom and Support Act
- October 4: Department of Homeland Security Appropriations Act, 2007
- October 13: SAFE Port Act
- October 17: Military Commissions Act of 2006
- October 26: Secure Fence Act of 2006
- November 27: Animal Enterprise Terrorism Act
- December 19: Combating Autism Act
- December 19: Pandemic and All-Hazards Preparedness Act

=== 2007 ===
- May 22: Food, Conservation, and Energy Act of 2008
- May 25: U.S. Troop Readiness, Veterans' Care, Katrina Recovery, and Iraq Accountability Appropriations Act, 2007
- July 26: Foreign Investment and National Security Act of 2007
- August 3: Implementing Recommendations of the 9/11 Commission Act of 2007
- August 5: Protect America Act of 2007
- August 9: America COMPETES Act
- September 14: Honest Leadership and Open Government Act
- September 27: Food and Drug Administration Amendments Act of 2007
- December 19: Energy Independence and Security Act of 2007

=== 2008 ===
- January 8: National Instant Criminal Background Check System Improvement Amendments Law
- February 13: Economic Stimulus Act of 2008
- April 9: Second Chance Act (2007)
- April 24: Newborn Screening Saves Lives Act of 2007
- May 8: Consolidated Natural Resources Act of 2008
- May 21: Genetic Information Nondiscrimination Act
- June 30: Supplemental Appropriations Act of 2008
- June 30: Post-9/11 Veterans Educational Assistance Act of 2008
- July 10: Foreign Intelligence Surveillance Act of 1978 Amendments Act of 2008
- July 29: Clean Boating Act of 2008
- July 30: Housing and Economic Recovery Act of 2008
- August 14: Consumer Product Safety Improvement Act
- September 25: ADA Amendments Act of 2008
- October 3: Emergency Economic Stabilization Act of 2008
- October 13: Drug Trafficking Vessel Interdiction Act
- October 16: Rail Safety Improvement Act of 2008
- December 23: Short-term Analog Flash and Emergency Readiness Act

== Legislation vetoed ==
President Bush vetoed eight pieces of legislation during his presidency:

- July 19, 2006: Stem Cell Research Enhancement Act known as H.R. 810.
- May 1, 2007: U.S. Troop Readiness, Veterans' Care, Katrina Recovery, and Iraq Accountability Appropriations Act of 2007. Earlier version of this bill known as H.R. 1591.
- June 20, 2007: Stem Cell Research Enhancement Act of 2007 also known as (S. 5).
- October 3, 2007: State Children's Health Insurance Program Reauthorization Act of 2007 also known as H.R. 976.
- November 2, 2007: Water Resources Development Act of 2007 (veto overriden by Congress)
- December 12, 2007: State Children's Health Insurance Program Reauthorization Act of 2007 also known as H.R. 3963.
- June 18, 2008: Food, Conservation, and Energy Act of 2008 (veto overriden by Congress)
- July 15, 2008: Medicare Improvements for Patients and Providers Act of 2008 (veto overriden by Congress)

== International treaties signed ==
George W. Bush signed several international treaties, including :

- SORT (2002) - better known as the Moscow Treaty, the United States and Russia agreed to limit their nuclear arsenal to 1700–2200 operationally deployed warheads each.
- Stockholm Convention on Persistent Organic Pollutants (2001)
- International Cooperation on Computer Crimes (2001)
- Involvement of Children in Armed Conflict (2000)
- Sale of Children, Child Prostitution and Pornography (2000)

== Withdrawal from international treaties ==
Early on in his first term, George W. Bush withdrew from a number of international treaties, most of which had previously been signed but not ratified, including:

- Anti-Ballistic Missile Treaty
- Kyoto Protocol
