= Foreign investment =

Foreign Investment may refer to:

- Foreign direct investment, of a controlling ownership in a business in one country by an entity based in another country
- Foreign Investment and National Security Act of 2007, an Act of the United States Congress
- Foreign Investment and NRI Cell, Government of Haryana, in the Haryana State Industrial and Infrastructure Development Corporation (HSIIDC) Panchkula
- Foreign Investment Promotion Board, a national agency in India
- Foreign Investment Review Agency, ensures that foreign acquisition and establishment of businesses is beneficial to Canada
- Foreign Investment Review Board, examines proposals by foreign persons to invest in Australia
- Foreign portfolio investment, entry of funds into a country where foreigners deposit money in a country's bank or make purchases in the country's stock and bond markets, sometimes for speculation

== See also ==
- Vanuatu Foreign Investment Board
