= Parrot Anafi =

French camera drone

Anafi
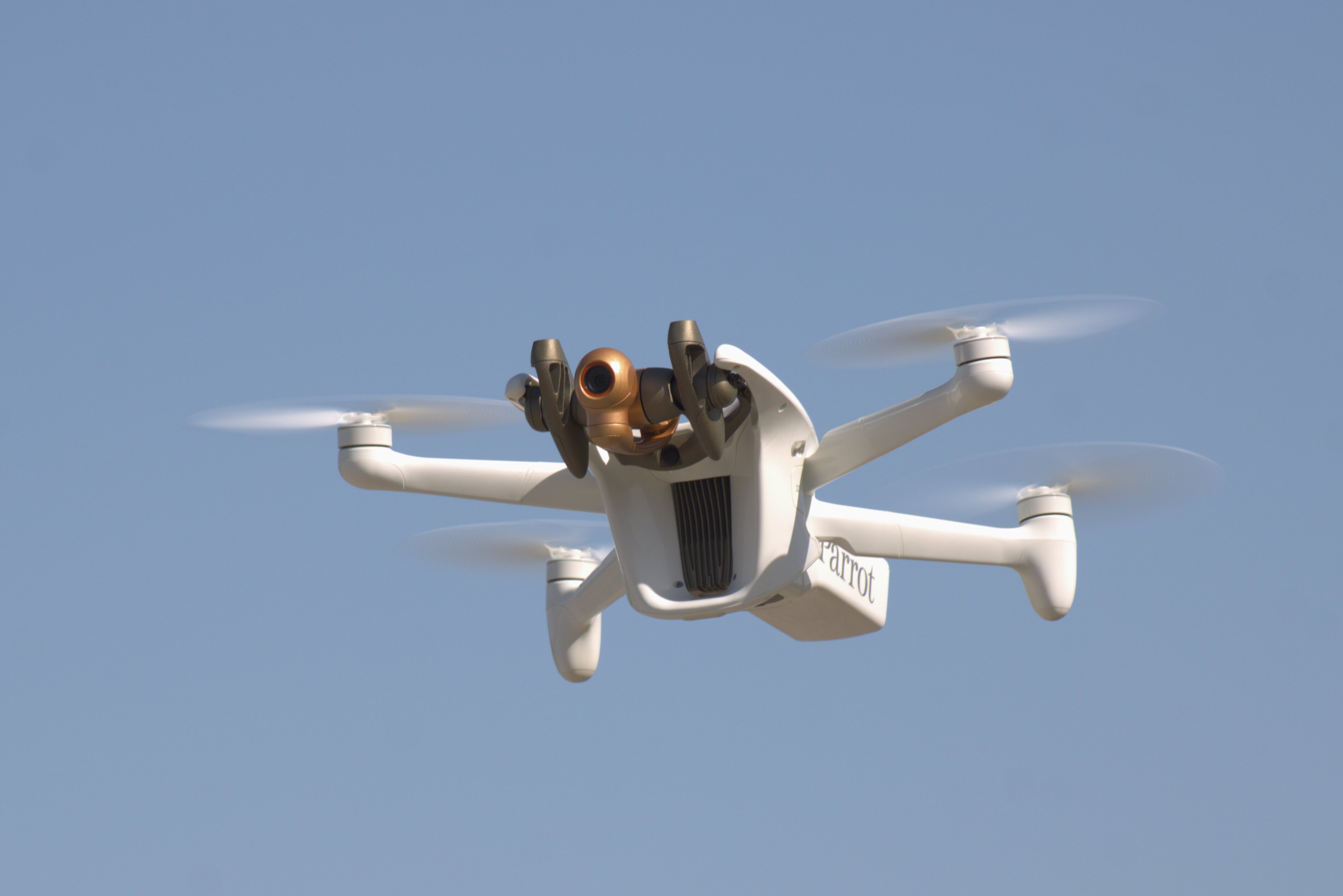
- Parrot Anafi Ai

General information
- Type: Camera drone
- National origin: France
- Manufacturer: Parrot SA; NEOTech
- Primary user: Japan Self-Defense Force; Ukrainian Armed Forces

History
- Manufactured: 2018–present
- Introduction date: June 2018

The Parrot Anafi (stylized as ANAFI) is a French teleoperated quadcopter drone produced by Parrot SA. Although the original consumer model suffered from numerous issues, later Anafi variants were adopted by multiple governments and militaries.

== Design and development ==
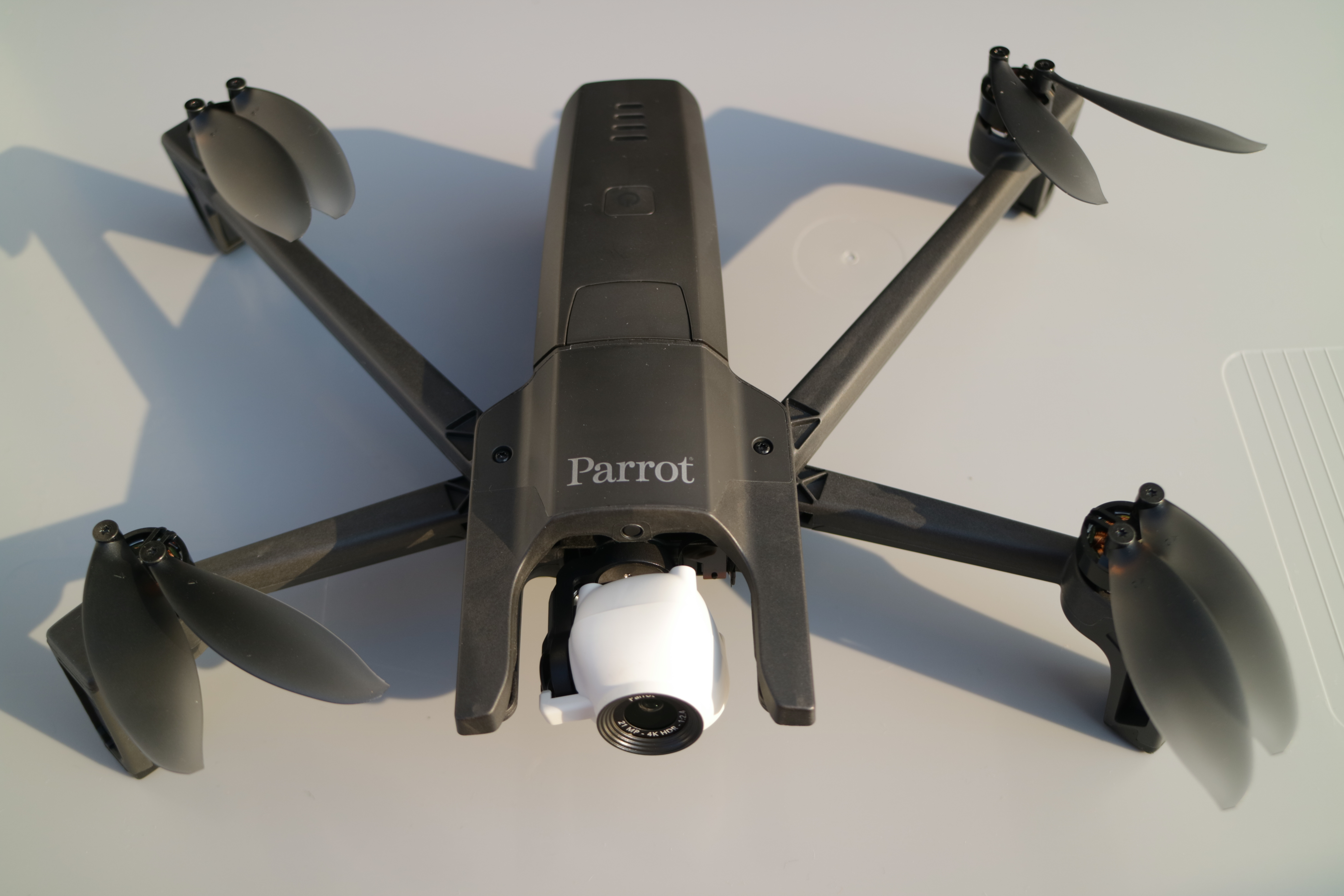
The original Anafi

Parrot announced the Anafi in June 2018. According to Parrot CEO Henri Seydoux, the drone's design was inspired by insects; with the camera as the head, electronics as the thorax, and the battery as the abdomen. The Anafi has four folding arms for portability similar to the competing DJI Mavic Air. The Anafi has a gimbal-stabilized 21-megapixel camera capable of shooting 4K high-dynamic-range (HDR) video, which features a Sony IMX230 sensor and "lossless" digital zoom capable of 1.4× zoom in 4K mode and 2.8× zoom in 1080p mode. The Anafi's two-axis gimbal is capable of 180 degrees of vertical rotation, while yaw stabilization is performed electronically. The drone has a top speed of 33 mph (53 km/h) and is capable of resisting winds up to 31 mph (50 km/h). While the drone was praised for its battery life – 25 minutes compared to 21 minutes for the Mavic Air – the Anafi suffered from numerous problems. Wired noted that the HDR video "looks pretty terrible" and was "more or less unusable". The Anafi also suffered from image noise issues in both standard 4K and HDR modes. Testing by The Verge found that the Anafi would lose control and crash if a person put their hand under the proximity sensor mid-flight, though the drone could survive a crash into a tree due to its carbon fiber and fiberglass construction.

The Anafi Thermal was introduced in April 2019 for enterprise customers and first responders. The Anafi Thermal differs from the original Anafi primarily in the addition of a 160×120-pixel FLIR Lepton 3.5 thermal camera; the same camera used on the competing DJI Mavic 2 Enterprise Dual. The thermal camera sits below the 4K HDR camera, which remained unchanged from the original. The Anafi Thermal's folding arms were also made slimmer, making the drone 10 g (0.022 lb) lighter and slightly increasing the flight time to 26 minutes.

A military version of the Anafi, the Anafi UA, was announced in April 2020. The drone features an improved camera suite consisting of three sensors; one 32× zoom camera and two thermal cameras.

The Anafi USA for enterprise customers was released in June 2020. The drone's gimbal mounts three sensors; two 32× zoom 21MP optical cameras and one 320×256-pixel FLIR Boson thermal camera. The Anafi USA has an IP53 protection rating and is powered by a 3400 mAh high-density LiPo battery, giving it a flight time of 32 minutes. The drone was also released in three additional versions; the SE, MIL, and GOV. The Anafi USA SE is controlled with a Skycontroller 4 remote similar to the baseline USA, but is intended for use with government organizations. The Anafi USA MIL and GOV are both NDAA and TAA compliant, Blue sUAS approved, and are controlled with a Skycontroller USA remote. The GOV and MIL differ primarily in that the latter has an AES 256 encrypted Microhard pDDL1800 radio communication system, is Tactical Open Government Architecture (TOGA) compatible, and has a slightly reduced flight time of 30 minutes. The Anafi USA is built in the United States by NEOTech.

On 30 June 2021, Parrot announced the Anafi Ai. Compared to the original Anafi, the Anafi Ai features an almost entirely redesigned frame with a large heat sink under the gimbal. According to Parrot, the Anafi Ai was the first consumer drone to primarily use a 4G link between the aircraft and the operator. The Anafi Ai also has an obstacle avoidance system which uses two cameras mounted on gimbals, allowing them to rotate forward, upward, and downward. This unique system saves weight by negating the need for individual forward, upward, and downward cameras, though it can only detect obstacles in one direction at a time. The Anafi Ai's primary camera was upgraded to 48MP.

An upgraded version of the Anafi USA, the Anafi UKR, was announced in June 2025. (Note: Though officially announced in 2025, the Anafi UKR was delivered to military customers as early as September 2024, when the Lithuanian Armed Forces received its first examples of the model.) The Anafi UKR was made using lessons learned from the Russo-Ukrainian war, during which electronic warfare made operating drones difficult. The drone is equipped with embedded artificial intelligence and is capable of navigating fully autonomously even in areas with electronic warfare and GNSS jamming. The Anafi UKR is controlled with a SkyController UKR remote.

== Variants ==
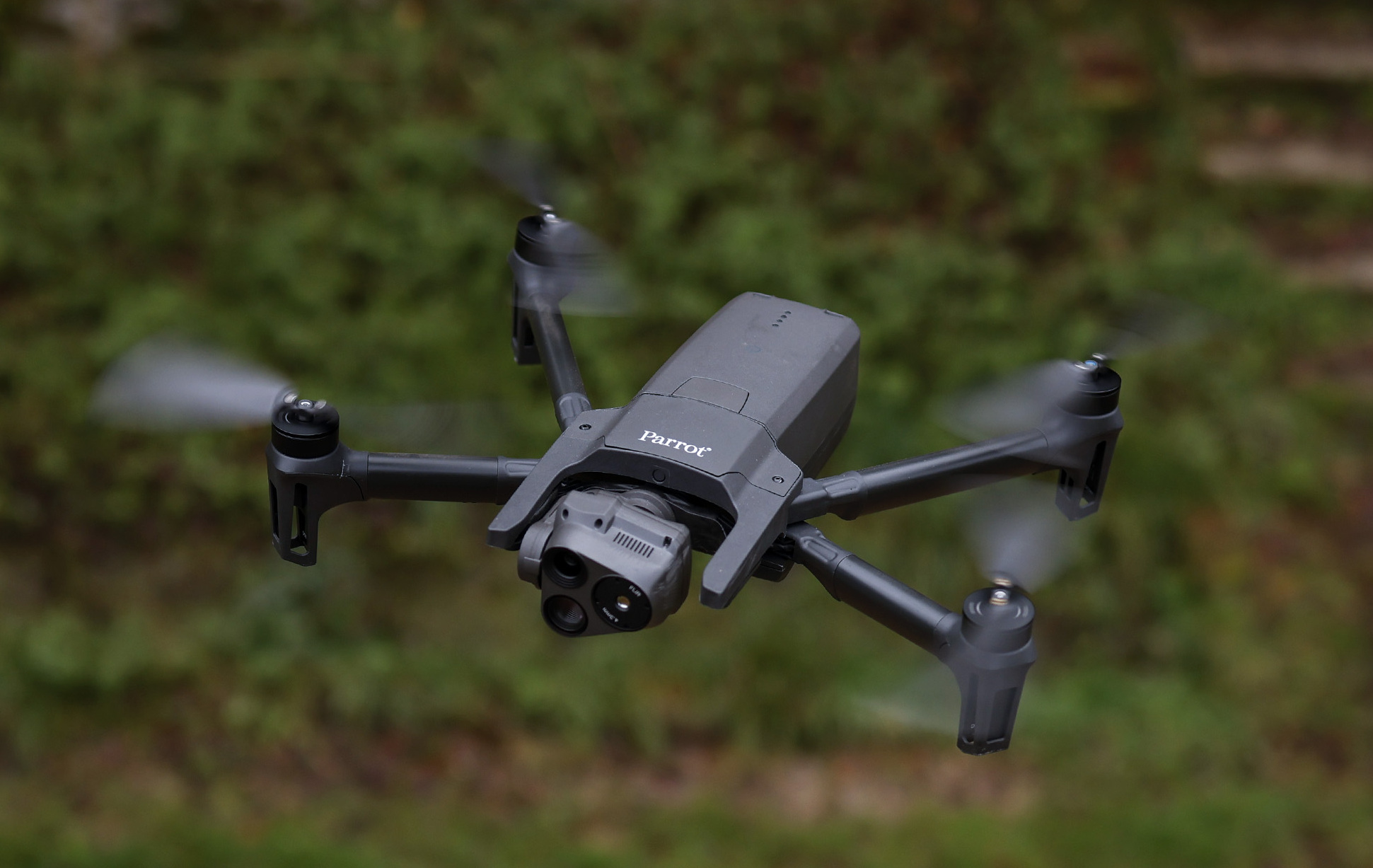
Anafi USA

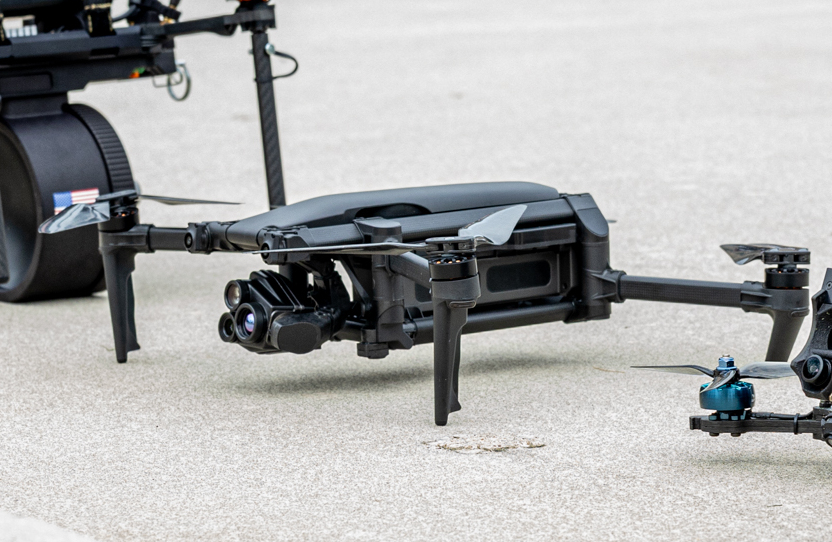
Anafi UKR

Anafi
Original model with an insect-inspired folding design, carbon fiber and fiberglass construction, a two-axis gimbal-stabilized 4K HDR camera with a Sony IMX230 sensor, and a flight time of 25 minutes. Announced in June 2018.
Anafi Thermal
Enterprise model with a 160×120-pixel FLIR Lepton 3.5 thermal camera in addition to the original optical camera, slimmer folding arms, and a flight time of 26 minutes. Introduced in April 2019.
Anafi UA
Militarized Anafi with a single 32× zoom optical camera and two thermal cameras. Announced in April 2020.
Anafi USA
Enterprise model with two 32× zoom 21MP optical cameras, one 320×256-pixel FLIR Boson thermal camera, an IP53 protection rating, and powered by a 3400 mAh high-density LiPo battery giving it a flight time of 32 minutes. Released in June 2020. Built in the United States by NEOTech.
Anafi USA SE
"Security Edition" of the Anafi USA intended for government operators.
Anafi USA GOV
NDAA and TAA compliant version of the Anafi USA intended for government operators.
Anafi USA MIL
As Anafi USA GOV but with an AES 256 encrypted Microhard pDDL1800 radio communication system, TOGA compatibility, and a flight time of 30 minutes.
Anafi Ai
Redesigned Anafi for enterprise customers with 4G capability, an obstacle avoidance system, and a 48MP camera. Announced on 30 June 2021.
Anafi UKR
Improved Anafi USA with embedded AI and the capability to operate fully autonomously in GNSS-denied environments. Released as early as September 2024, but officially announced in June 2025.
UAV 06 A Skatan
Swedish military designation of the Anafi USA GOV.

== Operators ==
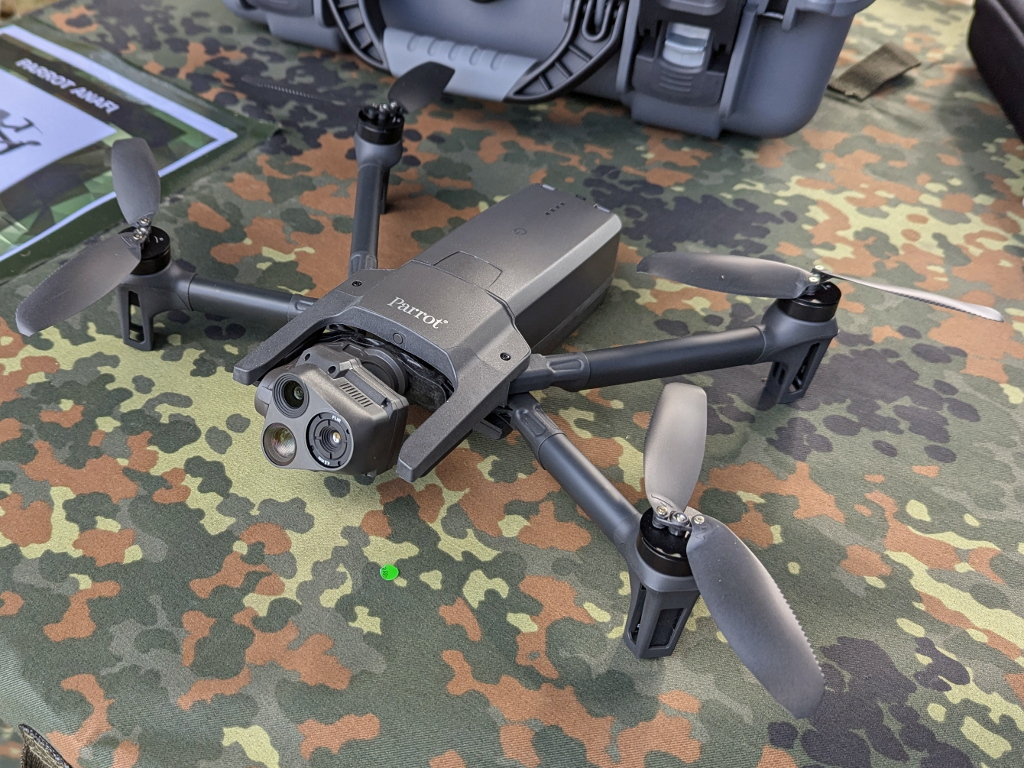
Anafi USA of the German Army

France
The Direction générale de l'armement selected the Anafi USA for use by the French Armed Forces in 2023, with plans to order 300 units. As of August 2025, the Anafi USA is still in service.
Italy
Italy uses the Anafi USA as of August 2025.
Lithuania
The Lithuanian Armed Forces received its first Anafi UKR drones in September 2024.
Luxembourg
Luxembourg uses the Anafi USA as of August 2025.
Norway
Norway uses the Anafi USA as of August 2025.
Poland
Poland uses the Anafi USA as of August 2025.
Portugal
Used by the Portuguese Army and by the Portuguese Navy.
Singapore
Army Intelligence used the Anafi USA or training as of 2022.
Sweden
Sweden uses the Anafi USA as of August 2025. The Anafi USA GOV is designated UAV 06 A Skatan in Swedish service.
Ukraine
The Anafi USA was among the many drone models donated by charities to Ukraine for use during the Russo-Ukrainian war.
United Kingdom
The United Kingdom uses the Anafi USA as of August 2025.

== Specifications (Anafi UKR) ==
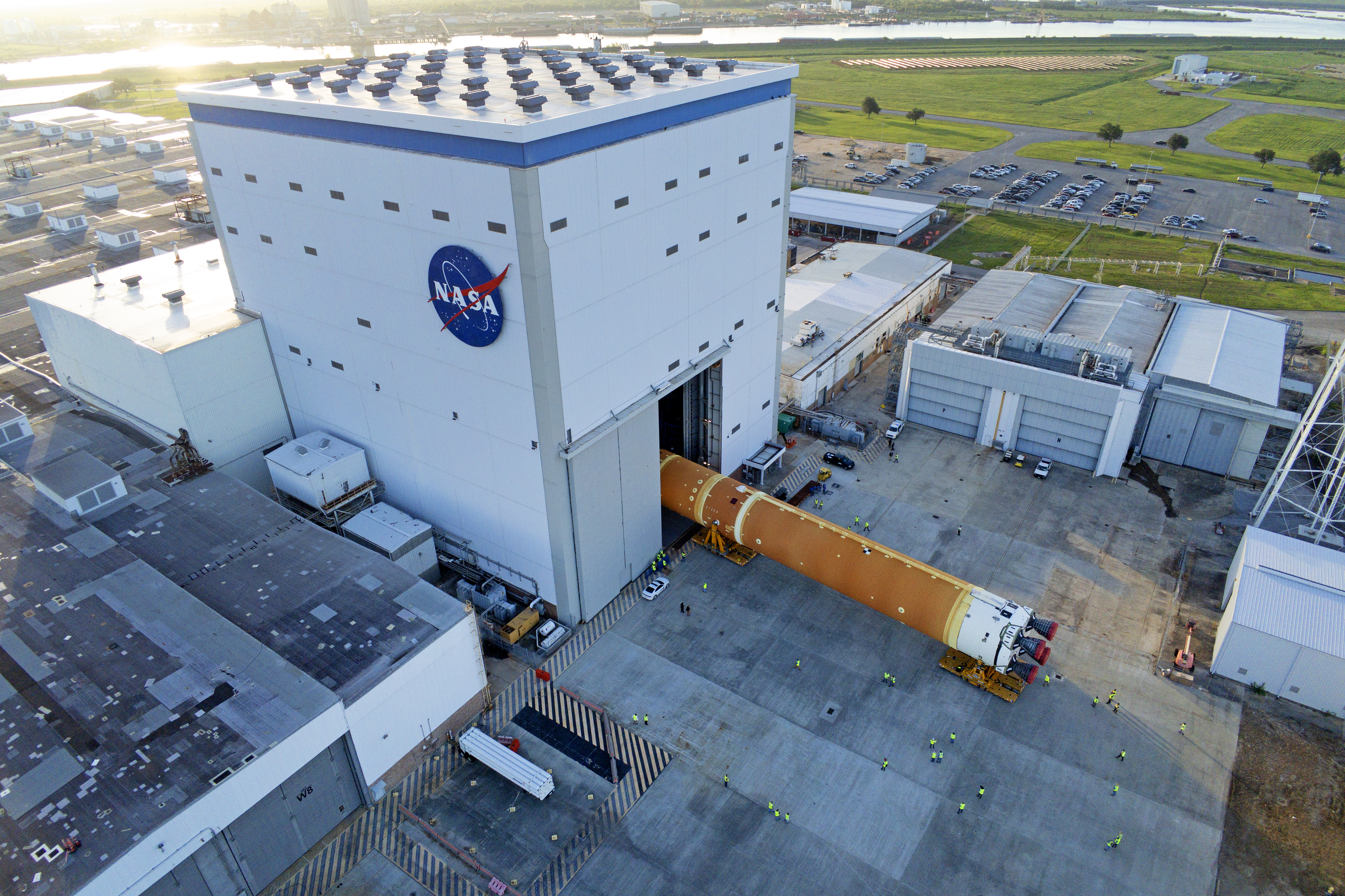
Image of the Artemis II core stage at Michoud Assembly Facility, taken with an Anafi USA.

Data from

General characteristics

- Length: 0.350 m (1 ft 1.8 in) (0.245 m (9.6 in) folded)
- Width: 0.665 m (2 ft 2.2 in) (0.160 m (6.3 in) folded)
- Height: 0.116 m (5 in)
- Empty weight: 0.959 kg (2.11 lb)
- Max takeoff weight: 1.450 kg (3.20 lb)
- Battery: 11.55V 6800 mAh high density LiPo

Performance

- Maximum speed: 61.2 km/h (38.0 mph, 33.0 kn)
- Range: 23.1 km (14.4 mi, 12.5 nmi) at 36 km/h (22 mph) airspeed
- Endurance: 38 minutes at 21.6 km/h (13.4 mph) airspeed
- Service ceiling: 5,000 m (16,000 ft) above mean sea level
- Rate of climb: 8 m/s (1,600 ft/min)
- Maximum wind resistance: 54 km/h (34 mph)
- Operating temperature: −36–50 °C (−33–122 °F)

Avionics

- Cameras:

- 21MP 1/2.4" sensor wide-angle camera
- 16MP 1/2.4" sensor rectilinear camera
- 640×512 Teledyne FLIR Boson thermal camera

- GNSS compatibility: GPS, GLONASS, Galileo, BeiDou
- Inertial measurement unit: 4× ICM-40609-D 6-axis IMU

== See also ==
- History of unmanned aerial vehicles

Aircraft of comparable role, configuration, and era

- Autel Evo
- DJI Mavic
- Skydio X2
- Skydio X10

Related lists

- List of unmanned aerial vehicles
