= Section 201 =

Section 201 of the US Trade Act of 1974 (19 U.S.C. § 2251) permits the President to grant temporary import relief, by raising import duties or imposing nontariff barriers on goods entering the United States that injure or threaten to injure domestic industries producing like goods. The provision is the analog of Article XIX of the GATT, which allows GATT contracting parties to provide relief from injurious competition if temporary protection will enable the domestic industry to make adjustments to meet the competition.

== Enforcement ==
Section 201 is rarely invoked. Nevertheless, there was a major April 2017 case involving the solar industry in the United States, where Suniva, a solar module manufacturer based in Atlanta, Georgia, declared bankruptcy, and within a week had filed a trade complaint using Section 201 as its primary basis.
