= Trade Act of 1974 =

United States trade law

- Long title: An Act to promote the development of an open, nondiscriminatory, and fair world economic system, to stimulate fair and free competition between the United States and foreign nations, to foster the economic growth of, and full employment in, the United States, and for other purposes.
- Nicknames: Trade Reform Act
- Enacted by: the 93rd United States Congress
- Effective: January 3, 1975

Citations
- Public law: 93-618
- Statutes at Large: 88 Stat. 1978-2

Codification
- Titles amended: 19 U.S.C.: Customs Duties
- U.S.C. sections created: 19 U.S.C. ch. 12 § 2101 et seq.

Legislative history
- Introduced in the House as H.R. 10710 by Al Ullman (D–OR) on October 3, 1973; Committee consideration by House Ways and Means, Senate Finance; Passed the House on December 11, 1973 (272-140); Passed the Senate on December 13, 1974 (77-4); Reported by the joint conference committee on December 19, 1974; agreed to by the House on December 20, 1974 (323-36) and by the Senate on December 20, 1974 (72-4); Signed into law by President Gerald Ford on January 3, 1975

The Trade Act of 1974 (Pub. L. 93–618, 88 Stat. 1978, enacted January 3, 1975, codified at 19 U.S.C. ch. 12) was passed to give the president more power in matters of trade agreements and tariffs. The act's authority expired in 1982 but was subsequently extended by Congress until 2010.

== Fast track authority ==
The Trade Act of 1974 created fast track authority for the president to negotiate trade agreements that Congress can approve or disapprove but cannot amend or filibuster. The act provided the president with tariff and non-tariff trade barrier negotiating authority for the Tokyo Round of multilateral trade negotiations. Gerald Ford was the president at the time. The fast track authority created under the act was set to expire in 1980, was extended for 8 years in 1979, was renewed again in 1988 until 1993 to allow for the negotiation of the Uruguay Round within the framework of the General Agreement on Tariffs and Trade (GATT), and was again extended to 16 April 1994, a day after the Uruguay Round concluded in the Marrakesh Agreement transforming the GATT into the World Trade Organization (WTO). It was restored in 2002 by the Trade Act of 2002. The Obama Administration sought renewal for fast track authority in 2012.

== Power to counteract unfair foreign trade practices ==
It also gave the president broad authority to counteract injurious and unfair foreign trade practices.

- Section 122 of the act (19 U.S.C. § 2132) allows the president to impose tariffs of up to 15% for up to 150 days in response to "large and serious" balance-of-payments deficits. The statute requires only presidential determination that such a deficit exists, but any measures imposed expire after 150 days unless Congress votes to extend them. Actions under 122 must be applied uniformly and cannot target individual countries.
- Section 135 of the act (19 U.S.C. § 2155) provides for the establishment of the Labor Advisory Committee for Trade Negotiations and Trade Policy (LAC) whose duty is to provide advice and information to the Office of the United States Trade Representative (USTR) and the Secretary of Labor regarding the U.S.'s negotiating objectives and bargaining positions before the nation enters into trade agreements with foreign countries. LAC is to meet on any trade agreement and provide a report to the president, the Congress, and the Office of the USTR at the conclusion of negotiations.
- Section 201 of the act requires the International Trade Commission to investigate petitions filed by domestic industries or workers claiming injury or threat of injury due to expanding imports. Investigations must be completed within 6 months. If such injury is found, restrictive measures may be implemented. Action under Section 201 is allowed under the GATT escape clause, GATT Article XIX.
- Section 301 was designed to eliminate unfair foreign trade practices that adversely affect U.S. trade and investment in both goods and services. Under Section 301, the president must determine whether the alleged practices are unjustifiable, unreasonable, or discriminatory and burden or restrict U.S. commerce. If the president determines that action is necessary, the law directs that all appropriate and feasible action within the president's power should be taken to secure the elimination of the practice. A Special 301 Report is prepared annually by the Office of the USTR which must identify a list of "Priority Foreign Countries", those countries judged to have inadequate intellectual property laws; these countries may be subject to sanctions. This has been issued every year beginning in 1989 since the enactment of the Omnibus Foreign Trade and Competitiveness Act of 1988 and the Uruguay Round Agreements Act (enacted in 1994). (See also China–United States trade war.)

== See also ==
- Trade Expansion Act
- Smoot-Hawley Tariff Act
- Trade Agreements Act of 1979
