= National Competitiveness Council =

The National Competitiveness Council (NCC; Irish: Comhairle Náisiúnta Iomaíochais) is an independent policy advisory body in Ireland. It reports to the Taoiseach on key competitiveness issues facing the Irish economy together with recommendations on policy actions required to enhance Ireland's competitive position. It was established by the Irish Government in May 1997 as part of the Partnership 2000 Social Partnership agreement. The Strategic Policy Division of the Department of Enterprise, Trade and Employment provides the council with research and secretariat support.

== Structure ==
Council Members are appointed by the Minister for Enterprise, Trade and Employment, and include representatives of the employer and trade union movements, including Irish Business and Employers Confederation and Irish Congress of Trade Unions. The composition of the council also includes persons with relevant expertise in competitiveness. A representative of the Department of Enterprise, Trade and Employment, typically the Assistant Secretary-General responsible for national competitiveness, is automatically appointed a member, under the terms of reference of the council.

Representatives from the Departments of the Taoiseach, Agriculture, Food and the Marine, Environment, Climate and Communications, Education, Public Expenditure and Reform, Transport and Tourism and Sport and from InterTradeIreland attend Council meetings in an advisory capacity. The NCC meets four or five times each year.

=== Chairperson of the Council ===
#	Name	Sector	Appointed	Retired
1.	Brian Patterson	Private Sector	May 1997	Unknown, 2001
2.	William Burgess	Private Sector	Unknown, 2001	November 2004
3.	Dr. Don Thornhill	Public Sector, Higher Education	May, 2005	January 2015
4.	Prof. Peter Clinch	Public Sector, Higher Education	January 2015	August 2019
5.	Dr. Frances Ruane	Public Sector, Higher Education	August 2019	Incumbent

== Publications ==
Each year the NCC publishes a report benchmarking Ireland's competitiveness performance. Ireland's Competitiveness Scorecard provides a comprehensive assessment of Ireland's competitiveness performance, using over 125 statistical indicators. The indicators are drawn from data sources such as OECD, Eurostat, CSO and others.

The council also publishes Ireland's Competitiveness Challenge on an annual basis. The Competitiveness Challenge report focuses on the national competitiveness issues of most importance to the enterprise sector and identifies policy recommendations required to address these issues. Ireland's Competitiveness Challenge builds on the data published in Ireland's Competitiveness Scorecard which benchmarks Ireland's competitiveness across a range of statistical indicators. Over recent years, a report benchmarking the Costs of Doing Business in Ireland has become a regular feature of the council's annual output.

Where appropriate, the NCC also issues statements on key competitiveness issues. In May 2012, for example, the Council published Ireland's Productivity Performance, 1980-2011 which maps Ireland's productivity performance over the last three decades relative to the UK, the US and the EU. In the past, it has issued statements on Education and Training, Cities -Drivers of National Competitiveness, Wellbeing and Competitiveness, Prices and Costs, Innovation, Inflation, Labour Supply and Skills and Regulatory Reform

As well as publishing statements, the NCC also regularly makes submissions on issues relating to Ireland's competitiveness. For example, in January 2015, the NCC published its submission regarding Action Plan for Jobs 2016. The council also issues Competitiveness Bulletins on specific topics of concerns, for example in June 2015 it published a bulletin on Electricity Costs and Competitiveness. Subsequently, Bulletins have been published on topics including capital investment, the labour market, legal services reform, and commercial insurance costs.
