= Japan Foreign Investment Committee =

Japanese government body

The Japan Foreign Investment Committee (JFIC) is an inter-agency committee in the government of Japan that reviews the national security implications of foreign investments in the Japanese economy.

== History ==
In October 2025, while running to become the president of the Liberal Democratic Party, Sanae Takaichi said "I believe we need to establish a Japanese version of CFIUS for security clearance". On 29 May 2026, the National Diet passed amendments to the Foreign Exchange and Foreign Trade Act, which stipulated the creation of the Japan Foreign Investment Committee. The JFIC was established on 29 June 2026. Prime Minister Sanae Takaichi attended the inaugural meeting of the JFIC at the Prime Minister's Office.

== Structure ==
The meetings of the JFIC are led by the Ministry of Finance and the National Security Secretariat, while the Ministry of Economy, Trade and Industry and the Ministry of Defense also participate in the meetings. The JFIC's Secretariat is located within the Ministry of Finance.

== See also ==
- Committee on Foreign Investment in the United States
