= Committee on Foreign Investment in the United States =

U.S. government agency

The Committee on Foreign Investment in the United States (CFIUS, /ˈsɪfiəs/) is an inter-agency committee in the United States government that reviews the national security implications of foreign investments in the U.S. economy.

CFIUS, led by the U.S. Treasury Secretary, includes members from key government departments such as Defense, State, Commerce, and Homeland Security. Some White House offices, such as the National Security Council, also participate when needed.

CFIUS oversees transactions that might give foreign entities control of U.S. businesses. This includes mergers, acquisitions, or takeovers. It also reviews investments in critical technologies, infrastructure, sensitive data, and specific real estate deals. At CFIUS' recommendation, the President may suspend or prohibit transactions deemed threatening to U.S. national security.

CFIUS was established in 1975 by President Gerald Ford's Executive Order 11858, pursuant to Section 721 of the Defense Production Act, initially to study and provide policy recommendations regarding foreign investment. Concerns about Japanese investment in the 1980s, such as Fujitsu's attempt to buy Fairchild Semiconductor, prompted Congress to pass the Exon–Florio Amendment in 1988. This gave the president the power to block foreign deals after a CFIUS review. The committee was granted formal statutory authority by the Foreign Investment and National Security Act of 2007 and further strengthened in 2018 by the Foreign Investment Risk Review and Modernization Act.

CFIUS does not acknowledge which deals are under review nor require the involvement of any of relevant parties. It utilizes classified information from the U.S. Intelligence Community and does not publicly announce its findings. There is no statute of limitations for CFIUS to exert jurisdiction over a transaction. Companies that fail to file their transactions with CFIUS can face penalties or be required to reverse the deal.

== Process ==
CFIUS is legally authorized to investigate and review transactions involving foreign investment and/or real estate transactions by foreign persons and/or entities in the United States. CFIUS focuses on preventing U.S. technology or money from reaching restricted countries through foreign business deals; close scrutiny is particularly given to acquisitions of critical infrastructure, such as public health or telecommunications. CFIUS has investigated "restrictions on sale of advanced computers to any of a long list of foreign recipients, ranging from China to Iran", including deals involving U.S. allies, such as the acquisition of United Defense by U.K. company BAE Systems in 2005. The majority of transactions submitted to CFIUS are approved without difficulty, but at least one deal involving an Israeli firm was cancelled once CFIUS began scrutinizing it.

All companies proposing to be involved in an acquisition by a foreign firm are supposed to voluntarily notify CFIUS, although the committee may also unilaterally initiate a review, and maintains jurisdiction over "non-notified transactions" indefinitely, including those that have since been completed. Once notified, CFIUS has 45 days to approve the deal or start an investigation. If an investigation begins, it has another 45 days to decide whether to approve the deal or require changes. Most transactions submitted to CFIUS are approved within the initial 45-day period without the statutory investigation. However, in 2022, roughly 56% of the 286 cases submitted to CFIUS proceeded to investigation, compared to about 40% of the 114 submitted a decade earlier. If more investigation is necessary beyond the statutory period, parties are asked to withdraw and refile.

CFIUS advises the president on whether to block or restrict a deal. The president has 15 days to make a decision after CFIUS submits its recommendation. If the president does not take any action or needs more information than the 15-day presidential review period can provide, CFIUS can extend the presidential review period to additional 15 days or continue its investigation within its current statutory period or reset the statutory period if parties withdraw and refile. The president cannot act on a CFIUS recommendation outside the presidential review period provided by law. If CFIUS approves the transaction, the parties involved will receive a safe harbor with respect to that transaction being investigated provided no CFIUS regulations and any mitigation orders, conditions, or agreements imposed by CFIUS are violated.

Civil penalties may result in up to $250,000 per violation or the value of the transaction, whichever is greater, on any persons and/or entities that willfully violated CFIUS regulations, and any mitigation orders, conditions, or agreements imposed by CFIUS. The actual penalties depend on CFIUS rules and the specifics of the violation.

== History ==
In 1975, President Ford created the committee by Executive Order 11858. It was composed of the secretary of the treasury as the chairman, secretary of state, secretary of defense, secretary of commerce, the assistant to the president for economic affairs, and the executive director of the Council on Foreign Economic Policy. The executive order also stipulated that the committee would have "primary continuing responsibility within the Executive Branch for monitoring the impact of foreign investment in the United States, both direct and portfolio, and for coordinating the implementation of United States policy on such investment." In particular, CFIUS was directed to:

1. arrange for the preparation of analyses of trends and significant developments in foreign investments in the United States;
2. provide guidance on arrangements with foreign governments for advance consultations on prospective major foreign governmental investments in the United States;
3. review investments in the United States which, in the judgment of the committee, might have major implications for United States national interests; and
4. consider proposals for new legislation or regulations relating to foreign investment as may appear necessary.

In 1980, President Jimmy Carter added the United States trade representative and substituted the chairman of the Council of Economic Advisers for the executive director of the Council on International Economic Policy by Executive Order 12188.

In 1988, the Exon–Florio Amendment was the result of national security concerns in Congress caused by the proposed purchase of Fairchild Semiconductor by Fujitsu. The Exon-Florio Amendment granted the president the authority to block proposed mergers, acquisitions, and takeovers that threaten national security. In 1988, President Ronald Reagan added the attorney general and the director of the Office of Management and Budget by Executive Order 12661. Reagan also delegated the review process to the Committee on Foreign Investment in the United States in the same executive order, utilizing the statutory authority the U.S. Congress enacted to enable the president to review foreign investments, in the form of Exon-Florio Amendment.

In 1992, the Byrd Amendment required CFIUS to investigate proposed mergers, acquisitions, and takeovers where the acquirer is acting on behalf of a foreign government and affects national security. In 1993, President Bill Clinton added the director of the Office of Science and Technology Policy, the national security advisor, and the assistant to the president for economic policy by Executive Order 12860. In 2003, President George W. Bush added the secretary of homeland security by Executive Order 13286.

The Foreign Investment and National Security Act of 2007 (FINSA) established the committee by statutory authority, reduced membership to six cabinet members and the attorney general, added the secretary of labor and the director of national intelligence, and removed seven White House appointees. In 2008, President Bush added the United States trade representative and the director of the Office of Science and Technology Policy by Executive Order 13456 implementing the law. FINSA requires the president to conduct a national security investigation of certain proposed investment transactions, provides a broader oversight role for Congress, and keeps the president as the only officer with the authority to suspend or prohibit mergers, acquisitions, and takeovers.

In 2018, President Donald Trump signed the Foreign Investment Risk Review Modernization Act (FIRRMA), which granted CFIUS new powers over particular types of FDI that mainly concern Chinese investors. These include real estate investing, minority investments through private equity that provide access to U.S. tech companies' business information, and U.S.-Chinese joint ventures. CFIUS also gained more appropriations, staffing, authority to enforce a longer review period, and formalizes more thorough material agreement disclosure. Trump's successor, President Joe Biden signed an executive order in September 2022 directing CFIUS to sharpen its scrutiny of foreign investment that could impact cyber security, quantum computing, biotechnology, and sensitive data.

CFIUS has gained greater importance within the U.S. national security apparatus, primarily in the context of the ongoing trade war between the U.S. and China. The New York Times described the committee as "powerful and unseen", observing its power to "kill the biggest multibillion-dollar global deals". The number of deals reviewed by CFIUS has increased markedly since 2018, as have the number of unilateral inquiries of non-notified deals.

In January 2025, President Joe Biden, acting on the recommendation of CFIUS, blocked a $14.9 billion merger proposal between U.S. Steel and Japan's Nippon Steel. The decision was based on national security concerns after CFIUS failed to reach a consensus on the deal. Nippon and U.S. Steel subsequently challenged the decision in federal court, arguing that the president's action was politically motivated and lacked a legal basis. Legal experts have highlighted the limited scope for judicial review in cases involving national security, noting the courts' traditional deference to executive decisions under the CFIUS statute. CFIUS's expanded powers under FIRRMA and subsequent actions have made it a gatekeeper for foreign acquisitions involving U.S. businesses.

In January 2025, it was reported that Chinese hackers had breached CFIUS and accessed documents. In February 2025, Donald Trump signed an executive order that directed CFIUS to restrict Chinese investment in strategic economic areas. In February 2026, the United States Department of Justice filed its first lawsuit to enforce a CFIUS ruling.

== Reception ==
Press reports have repeatedly criticized CFIUS for its secrecy, referring to the Committee's investigations as a "black box." Advocates for its current level of confidentiality argue that there are few alternatives, as CFIUS' work is based on classified national security information, which cannot be disclosed to the public.

In February 2006, prior to the implementation of two major regulatory expansions (FINSA, 2007; FIRRMA, 2018), Richard Perle—a neoconservative in the Bush Administration's Department of Defense that falsely alleged an Iraqi WMD program—gave his opinion on CFIUS when he related to CBS News his experience with the panel during the Reagan administration: "The committee almost never met, and when it deliberated it was usually at a fairly low bureaucratic level." However, expansions in power and heightened public interest in foreign direct investment since 2006 have reportedly required significantly elevated input from senior U.S. government officials across CFIUS agencies, reaching the highest tiers of government. Jon D. Michaels argues that CFIUS’s interagency governance structure helps to offset some of the accountability deficits regularly associated with a lack of transparency and the unavailability of judicial review. He explains that the “institutional diversity embodied by the Committee assures that proposed foreign investments are assessed from a variety of perspectives. Treasure, Commerce, State, Justice, Energy, and Defense will all represent their institutional concerns. In the process of coming to terms with each other’s positions, they are more likely to achieve balance in promoting the United States’s core interests.”

Others emphasize the crucial role that foreign direct investment plays in the U.S. economy, and the discouraging effect that heightened scrutiny may cause. Foreign investors in the United States, much like U.S. investors elsewhere, bring expertise and infusions of capital into often-struggling sectors of the U.S. economy. In a February 2006 interview with The New York Times, another former Reagan administration official, Clyde V. Prestowitz Jr., noted that the United States "need[s] a net inflow of capital of $3 billion a day to keep the economy afloat. ... Yet all of the body language here is 'go away.'"

== Notable cases ==
- 1990: President George H. W. Bush voided the sale of MAMCO Manufacturing to a Chinese agency, ordering China National Aero-Technology Import & Export Corporation to divest themselves of Seattle-based MAMCO
- 2000: Japanese NTT Communications' acquisition of Verio
- 2005: The acquisition of IBM's personal computer and laptop unit by Lenovo
- 2005: The acquisition of Sequoia Voting Systems of Oakland, California, by Smartmatic, a Dutch company contracted by Hugo Chávez's government to replace that country's elections machinery
- 2005: In June 2005 a CNOOC Group (a major Chinese state-owned oil and gas corporation) subsidiary (CNOOC limited, publicly listed on the New York and Hong Kong stock exchanges) made an $18.5 billion cash offer for American oil company Unocal Corporation, topping an earlier bid by ChevronTexaco. While this offer was not opposed by the CFIUS and the Bush Administration, it was criticized by several Congressmen and, following a vote in the United States House of Representatives, the bid was referred to President George W. Bush, on the grounds that its implications for national security needed to be reviewed. On July 20, 2005, Unocal Corporation announced that it had accepted a buyout offer from ChevronTexaco for $17.1 billion, which was submitted to Unocal stockholders on August 10. On August 2, CNOOC Limited announced that it had withdrawn its bid, citing political tensions in the United States.
- 2006: State-owned Dubai Ports World's planned acquisition of P&O, the lessee and operator of many terminals, mostly for container ships, in several ports, including in New York-New Jersey and others in the US. This acquisition was initially approved by CFIUS and then President G.W. Bush, but was eventually opposed by Congress (Dubai Ports World controversy).
- 2010: Russian interests acquired a controlling interest in Uranium One, which has 20 percent of U.S. uranium extraction capacity. The Nuclear Regulatory Commission approved the deal because Uranium One only has a license for uranium recovery, not uranium export.
- 2012: Ralls Corporation, owned by the Chinese Sany Group, was ordered by President Barack Obama to divest itself of four small wind farm projects located too close to a U.S. Navy weapons systems training facility in Boardman, Oregon.
- 2016: President Obama blocked the buying by a Chinese company of the U.S. assets of the German company Aixtron SE. Separately, The New York Times reported that "United States officials blocked" a $2.6 billion deal by Philips to sell Lumileds division to GO Scale Capital and GRS Ventures over concerns regarding Chinese applications of gallium nitride.
- 2017: President Trump blocked the acquisition by a Chinese purchaser of Lattice Semiconductor.
- 2018: President Trump blocked Singapore-based Broadcom Limited from purchasing Qualcomm in a hostile takeover, citing national security concerns raised by CFIUS.
- 2019: CFIUS requested that Chinese gaming company Beijing Kunlun Tech Co Ltd. sell Grindr, citing national security concerns regarding a database of user's location, messages, and HIV status, after the company acquired the gay dating app in two separate transactions in 2016 and 2018, both without CFIUS review. Kunlun sold Grindr for about $608.5 million in March 2020.
- 2020: President Trump threatened to ban TikTok via International Emergency Economic Powers Act and the National Emergencies Act, but in August declared a September 15 deadline for a sale to an American company. TikTok successfully challenged the ban via federal court, and the Biden administration asked to delay the government's appeal of a federal district court judge's December injunction against the TikTok ban as President Biden undertakes a broad review of his predecessor's efforts to address potential security risks from Chinese tech companies and to allow CFIUS to review TikTok via its previous 2017 acquisition of musical.ly.

== Notifications and investigations ==
CFIUS Notifications and Investigations, 1988–2024

Year	Notifications	Investigations	Notices withdrawn	Presidential decision
1988	14	1	0	1
1989	204	5	2	3
1990	295	6	2	4
1991	152	1	0	1
1992	106	2	1	1
1993	82	0	0	0
1994	69	0	0	0
1995	81	0	0	0
1996	55	0	0	0
1997	62	0	0	0
1998	65	2	2	0
1999	79	0	0	0
2000	72	1	0	1
2001	55	1	1	0
2002	43	0	0	0
2003	41	2	1	1
2004	53	2	2	0
2005	65	2	2	0
2006	111	7	19	2
2007	138	6	15	0
2008	155	23	23	0
2009	65	25	7	0
2010	93	35	12	0
2011	111	40	6	0
2012	114	45	22	1
2013	97	48	8	0
2014	147	51	12	0
2015	143	66	13	0
2016	172	79	21	1
2017	237	172	67	1
2018	229	158	64	1
2019	231	113	30	1
2020	187	88	29	1
2021	272	130	74	0
2022	286	162	87	0
2023	233	128	57	0
2024	209	116	49	2

== See also ==
- Title 31 of the Code of Federal Regulations
- The Advisory Committee for Evaluating National Security Aspects of Foreign Investments
- Japan Foreign Investment Committee
