= Advisory Committee for Evaluating National Security Aspects of Foreign Investments =

Israeli government agency

- הוועדה המייעצת לבחינת היבטי ביטחון לאומי בהשקעות זרות; Ha-Va'ada Ha-Meyatzet Le-Vhinat Hebetey Bitakhon Le'umi Be-Hashka'ot Zarot

Committee overview
- Formed: 1 January 2020
- Jurisdiction: Government of Israel
- Website: Official website

The Advisory Committee for Evaluating National Security Aspects of Foreign Investments (Hebrew: הוועדה המייעצת לבחינת היבטי ביטחון לאומי בהשקעות זרות, romanized: Ha-Va'ada Ha-Meyatzet Le-Vhinat Hebetey Bitakhon Le'umi Be-Hashka'ot Zarot) is a mechanism of the Government of Israel for overseeing foreign investments in the country. Its role is to provide advice to regulatory bodies. It was established on 30 October 2019 by a decision of the Security Cabinet, after pressure from the United States government and particularly during the first Trump administration. It began operating on 1 January 2020.

The committee operates under the authority (Note: This decision replaced the previous decision on the matter, B/372 from 30 October 2019, which established the committee. See Decision B/41 Article 17.) of Decision B/41 of the thirty-fourth government's Security Cabinet. The chair of the committee is the Chief Economist at the Ministry of Finance. The committee was established by the thirty-fourth government of Netanyahu, and its powers were expanded by the thirty-sixth government of Bennett and Lapid.

== Background ==
Between 2013 and 2014, a process was conducted by the Ministry of Finance, the National Security Council (NSC), and the National Economic Council, which dealt with examining security guidelines in preparation for an international tender for the operator of critical national infrastructure, and in particular the implications of the identity of the operating entity.

In 2016, the NSC initiated a process to examine the need to establish a mechanism that would review the involvement of foreign companies in Israel's economy. In February, the first discussion on the matter was held, with the participation of the Prime Minister's Office; the Ministries of Defense, Foreign Affairs, Finance, Justice, and Economy and Industry; the National Economic Council; and security bodies – the National Cyber Bureau, the Israel Security Agency, and the Mossad. In September, the NSC recommended empowering a dedicated mechanism to supervise investments related to national resilience through legislation. The National Economic Council, the Chief Economist at the Ministry of Finance (the committee chair), and officials in the Prime Minister's Office and the Ministry of Economy refrained from establishing a mechanism for several reasons: concern that it would become a diplomatic issue and create excessive regulation. The process under the NSC ended in September 2016.

Following the process conducted at the NSC, and the National Economic Council's position that a formal body on the subject should be avoided, the Council sought to lead a parallel staff process that was conducted between October 2016 and January 2018, with the participation of government bodies partially overlapping those that took part in the NSC process, and representatives from the business sector. In May 2018, the NSC again began the process of formulating a draft decision, which ultimately was not brought to the Security Cabinet. On 23 November 2018, the cabinet adopted Decision B/331 to promote the issue, which determined that a team headed by the NSC should be established to propose criteria and a mechanism in the field. In parallel with the staff work led by the NSC and the National Economic Council, the State Comptroller conducted an examination on the subject from December 2018 to June 2019, which was published in 2020.

On 30 October 2019, the Ministerial Committee on National Security Affairs of the thirty-fourth Government of Israel decided to establish the committee (Decision B/372). This followed diplomatic pressure from the Trump administration to establish a mechanism parallel to the Committee on Foreign Investment in the United States (CFIUS). This came after concerns were expressed regarding investments by Chinese companies in Israel. The committee seeks to balance Israel's economic interests with its security interests; while the security bodies and the National Security Council worried that foreign investments in the country would harm bilateral relations with the United States and lead to foreign influence and security risks – the economic authorities feared that overly strict oversight of investments would lead to their withdrawal.

The committee began operating on 1 January 2020.

== Purpose ==
The committee's purpose is to serve as an advisory body for regulatory entities in the State of Israel that are lawfully authorized to approve a foreign investment, and to address national security aspects that may arise as a result.

The cabinet decision under which the committee was established defines "foreign investment" as a transaction or activity by a foreign actor that requires approval from a regulatory body for its execution. It also defines national security interests as follows, per decision B/41:

- "Preventing the creation of a significant position of influence by a foreign actor over the foreign investment in a manner liable to harm the security of the state or its foreign relations. In examining this interest, it will be possible to consider, among other things, the scope and characteristics of the foreign actor's investments in Israel" (Note: Hebrew: מניעת היווצרות של עמדת השפעה משמעותית של גורם זר על ההשקעה הזרה באופן העלול לפגוע בביטחון המדינה או ביחסי החוץ שלה. בבחינת אינטרס זה ניתן יהיה לשקול, בין היתר, את היקף ומאפייני ההשקעות של הגורם הזר בישראל) (Note: This part of the definition was expanded by Security Cabinet Decision B/41 in October 2022, which broadened the committee’s powers. Upon the committee’s establishment in 2019, the wording was more limited and read: "Preventing the creation of a significant position of influence over the subject of the foreign investment by a foreign actor, in a manner liable to harm the security of the state or its foreign relations". (Note: "Hebrew: מניעת היווצרות של עמדת השפעה משמעותית על נשוא ההשקעה הזרה של גורם זר באופן העלול לפגוע בביטחון המדינה או ביחסי החוץ שלה"))
- "Preventing exposure or disclosure of information whose exposure or disclosure to a foreign actor could harm the security of the state or its foreign relations" (Note: "Hebrew: מניעת חשיפה או גילוי של מידע שגילויו או חשיפתו לגורם זר עלול לפגוע בביטחון המדינה או ביחסי החוץ שלה")

== Authority and power ==
The committee's principal activity is to advise regulatory bodies on foreign investments that they are lawfully authorized to approve. In addition, the committee is authorized to approach the relevant regulator on its own initiative and propose that it seek the committee's opinion when a security concern exists, or to request the transfer of information from a regulator in advance of a potential investment.

The committee's decisions are made unanimously by its members – senior representatives from the National Security Council, the Ministry of Defense, and the Ministry of Foreign Affairs – and the Chief Economist or a representative on his behalf (as chair of the committee). In addition, observers from the National Economic Council, the Ministry of Economy and Industry, and the Ministry of Finance participate.

The committee is obligated to report to the Security Cabinet on its ongoing activity, outputs, and recommendations on an annual basis.

== Activity ==
In April 2022, the Urbanix group (composed of Shikun & Binui, Egged Holdings, and CRRC), which competed in the tender of the state-owned company NTA for the construction and operation of the Green and Purple lines of the Dankal and lost, petitioned against it and against the advisory committee to the Tel Aviv District Court, claiming disqualification on the grounds of extraneous considerations. This was against the background of press reports about diplomatic pressure from the United States to prevent the victory of the Chinese candidate companies, as part of the China–United States trade war. After the petition was denied, the group appealed to the Supreme Court, but their request was also denied in that instance.

In October 2022, the Security Cabinet of the thirty-sixth Government of Israel (Bennett–Lapid government) expanded the committee's powers in Decision B/41, expanding the interpretation of "national security interests", and determining that it regards its areas of activity as protectable public interests that regulators must consider regardless of the decision to refer a matter to the committee. In addition, the definition of a "foreign actor" was amended; in the original decision, a "body of persons" was defined as foreign if it was incorporated outside the state's borders and was not controlled by an Israeli (resident or citizen), or if an Israeli held 25% of it. The new definition lowered the control threshold to 20%, with an exception under which the council may recognize a "body" as under foreign control if the committee regards its activity as raising concern for national security.

In August 2024, the committee published a methodology document that was formulated on the basis of its activity since 2020, in light of recommendations by the OECD on the matter – Methodology for Examining National Security Aspects in Foreign Investments (Hebrew: מתודולוגיה לבחינת היבטי ביטחון לאומי בהשקעות זרות, romanized: Metodologia L'vchinait Hivtei Bitachon Le'umi B'hashka'ot Zarot).

== See also ==
- Committee on Foreign Investment in the United States
