= Exon–Florio Amendment =

United States law regulating foreign investment

The Exon–Florio Amendment 50 U.S.C. app 2170 is a law that was enacted by the United States Congress in 1988 to review foreign investment within the United States. (It was later amended by the SAFE Port Act of 2006 and the Foreign Investment Risk Review Modernization Act of 2018.) The amendment was passed into law under the Omnibus Trade and Competitiveness Act of 1988 and amended Section 721 of Defense Production Act of 1950. All foreign investments that might affect national security may be reviewed and if deemed to pose a threat to security, the President of the United States may block the investment. According to the amendment, the president may block the investment when "there is credible evidence that leads the President to believe that the foreign interest exercising control might take action that threatens to impair the national security." President Reagan delegated the review process to the Committee on Foreign Investment in the United States.

The amendment was sponsored by Senator J. James Exon and Representative James J. Florio. The amendment was proposed over concerns of foreign acquisitions by Japanese businesses.

== See also ==
- Committee on Foreign Investment in the United States
- Omnibus Foreign Trade and Competitiveness Act
- Foreign Investment and National Security Act of 2007
