= Vanuatu Foreign Investment Promotion Agency =

Vanuatu government agency

Vanuatu Foreign Investment Promotion Agency (VFIPA)
Agency overview
- Formed: 1997
- Preceding Agency: Department of Trades and Industries's Vanuatu Foreign Investment Board
- Jurisdiction: Vanuatu
- Headquarters: Port Vila
- Employees: 15
- Annual budget: 49 Million VT
- Minister responsible: Hon. Matai Seremaiah, Minister for Tourism, Trade, Commerce and Ni Vanuatu Business
- Agency executives: Mr. Jimmy Rantes, Chairman; Ms. Francesca Grillo, Deputy Chairman; Mrs Minnie Bani, Acting Chief Executive Officer
- Parent department: Tamarama Bldg, Lini highway, Port Vila
- Website: www.investvanuatu.vu

The Vanuatu Foreign Investment Promotion Agency (VFIPA) (previously known as the Vanuatu Foreign Investment Promotion Authority), is Vanuatu's National investment promotion agency. It was established by the foreign investment act [cap 248] in 1998 and operating as a unit under the department of Trades and Industry with a mandate to "promote and facilitate foreign investments into Vanuatu."

Under the current corporate structure of the Agency, its Chief Executive Officer is accountable to the Agency's Board of Directors known as the "Vanuatu Investment Board" that reports to the Minister responsible for the Ministry - MTTCVB. Mr. Howard ARU was appointed chief executive officer of the VFIPA in June 2020.

== History and overview ==
The Vanuatu Investment Promotion Authority (VIPA) was established following a recommendation from the Comprehensive Reform Program (CRP) undertaken in 1997 and sponsored by the Asian Development Bank (ADB). The need to have an institution aimed at developing clear guidelines governing the promotion and facilitation of foreign direct investment was a key component under the CRP strategic pillar - Improving the incentives for private sector growth and employment. This saw the development and enactment of the Foreign Investment Act of 1998 [CAP 248] to establish the Vanuatu Investment Promotion Authority whose mandate is to expeditiously facilitate and promote foreign investment in Vanuatu.

Prior to the 1997-1998 CRP, a division within the Department of Trades and Industries was responsible for processing and approvals of foreign investment applications. The Board responsible at that time was known as the Vanuatu Foreign Investment Board (VFIB). Investment promotion and facilitation was a new development area at that time therefore the division was more focused on the processing and approval of investment proposals. But there has been too many red tapes during the process - resulting in a very costly exercise for a foreigner to do business in Vanuatu with very little or no investment promotion and facilitation at all. The recommendation by the CRP for a separate and autonomous institution was to address these issues, that will in turn contribute to an enabling business environment for the country.

In 1998 and onward, VIPA began implementing the Foreign Investment Act [CAP 248], still operating under the Public Service Commission (PSC). In 2008, VIPA was detached from the PSC and fully became a corporate body, with a board of directors as its immediate employer. An annual grant from the government remains the only source of income for the authority. Staff numbers began with four and have doubled since then with a 100% increase in its annual grant.

== Vision ==
Preceding VFIPA’s formation (formerly known as VIPA), the need for FDI at that time was very crucial; however, the business environment was not expected to attract foreign companies to invest in Vanuatu.

The Agency’s vision, "To become the Pacific region’s leading IPA delivering excellent service and aftercare support to our existing and potential foreign investors" was coined as its promotional campaign to both domestic and external investors including international partners that Vanuatu does have an IPA in place who can provide the services investors need and thus contribute to enhancing the business environment. [citation needed]

According to the World Bank Ease of Doing Business latest (2020) Report (EoDB), Vanuatu was ranked 107 out of the 190 economies. This indicator reflected how business regulatory framework have evolved over time as a result of many factors. The VFIPA remains proactive in its role of policy advocacy in collaboration with its key partners to push for reforms that will contribute improving the country’s EoDB ranking.
