= Trade Agreements Act of 1979 =

United States federal law

- Long title: An Act to approve and implement the trade agreements negotiated under the Trade Act of 1974, and for other purposes.
- Nicknames: Distilled Spirits Tax Revision Act of 1979
- Enacted by: the 96th United States Congress
- Effective: July 26, 1979

Citations
- Public law: 96-39
- Statutes at Large: 93 Stat. 144

Codification
- Titles amended: 19 U.S.C.: Customs Duties
- U.S.C. sections created: 19 U.S.C. ch. 13 § 2501 et seq.

Legislative history
- Introduced in the House as H.R. 4537 by James C. Wright, Jr. (D–TX) on June 19, 1979; Committee consideration by House Ways and Means, Senate Finance; Passed the House on July 11, 1979 (395-7); Passed the Senate on July 23, 1979 (90-4); Signed into law by President Jimmy Carter on July 26, 1979

The Trade Agreements Act of 1979 (TAA), Pub. L. 96–39, 93 Stat. 144, enacted July 26, 1979, codified at 19 U.S.C. ch. 13 (19 U.S.C. §§ 2501–2581), is an Act of Congress that governs trade agreements negotiated between the United States and other countries under the Trade Act of 1974. It provided the implementing legislation for the Tokyo Round of the General Agreement on Tariffs and Trade.

The stated purposes of the TAA are:

- Approve and implement the trade agreements negotiated under the Trade Act of 1974
- Foster the growth and maintenance of an open world trading system
- Expand opportunities for the commerce of the United States in international trade
- Improve the rules of international trade and to provide for the enforcement of such rules, and for other purposes

The TAA can restrict procurement of goods and services for federal contracts, if the program management office decides to check TAA compliance. In many ways the TAA supersedes the Buy American Act, because the TAA allows the President to waive the Buy American Act under certain conditions. Federal Acquisition Regulations (FAR) Subpart 25.4 includes guidance for TAA compliance. In general, a product is TAA compliant if it is made in the United States or a "Designated Country". Designated Countries include:

- Those with a free trade agreement with the United States such as Canada, Mexico, Australia, and Singapore
- Countries that participate in the World Trade Organization Agreement on Government Procurement (WTO GPA), including Japan and many countries in Europe
- Least developed countries such as Afghanistan, Bangladesh, Laos, and Ethiopia
- Caribbean Basin countries such as Aruba, Costa Rica, and Haiti

Notably absent from the list is the People's Republic of China. A full list of Designated Countries is in FAR 25.003.
