= Foreign Investment and National Security Act of 2007 =

United States Law

Foreign Investment and National Security Act
- Enacted by: the 110th United States Congress
- Effective: July 26, 2007

Legislative history
- Signed into law by President George W. Bush on July 26, 2007

Foreign Investment and National Security Act of 2007 (Pub. L. 110–49 (text) (PDF), 121 Stat. 246, enacted July 26, 2007) is an Act of the United States Congress.

The Act addresses investments made by foreign entities in the United States. The law strengthens pre-existing laws including the Exon-Florio Amendment and the Committee on Foreign Investment in the United States.

== History ==
=== Legislative history ===
The United States House of Representatives passed the bill on February 28, 2007, by a vote of 423 to 0. The United States Senate passed their version of the bill on June 29, 2007, by unanimous consent. On July 11, 2007, the House passed the Senate's version, S. 1610 by a vote of 370–45. The bill establishes a framework for the review of foreign acquisitions of US assets by the Committee on Foreign Investment in the United States (CFIUS). CFIUS reform has been in the works since the Dubai Ports World transaction passed through CFIUS without a formal investigation, leaving a surprised and angry Congress determined to avoid a repetition of that scenario. Impetus for reform first began, however, when the China National Offshore Oil Corporation publicly announced an interest in UNOCAL in 2005, and even earlier that same year, when a GAO report revealed the lack of Congressional oversight and the degree to which some CFIUS transactions were escaping formal investigation through withdrawal of applications, among other things.

== Implementation ==
The act was implemented by President George W. Bush's Executive Order 13456 on January 23, 2008. The Act addresses many of the issues that have been the focus of concern since the 2005 report: it establishes transaction-specific and general Congressional notification requirements, creates rules that dictate how applications before CFIUS may be withdrawn, and specifically includes energy supplies among critical US assets requiring special consideration. More generally, the bill establishes more stringent rules for the review and formal investigation of transactions, especially those involving foreign governments or critical infrastructure assets. It also requires senior-level involvement in various required certifications and reports, limiting the agencies' delegation authority. In general, then, the bill's provisions convey the seriousness with which Congress expects the CFIUS agencies to approach future reviews.

== Key Provisions ==
The bill's key provisions are as follows:

• The bill establishes the membership of CFIUS by statute, and creates a defined role for the Director of National Intelligence as an ex officio member who must evaluate the transaction's national security implications.

• On each future transaction, one of the member agencies would play a lead role, in addition to Treasury, depending on the transaction's subject matter. The lead agency would be responsible for negotiating and overseeing mitigation agreements.

• Transactions that involve foreign governments, a threat to national security, or control of critical infrastructure must be subject to a 45-day formal investigation, except that exceptions are possible for foreign government transactions if the Secretary or Deputy Secretary of Treasury and the lead agency certify that there is no national security threat.

• The bill requires sign-off at the assistant secretary level (or above) that a transaction does not fall into one of these categories and need not go beyond the 30-day review period. Similar sign-off is required at the close of the 45-day investigation period to confirm that the transaction does not threaten national security.

• CFIUS must report to Congress at the end of reviews and formal investigations. The bill also requires annual reports to Congress on the activities of CFIUS.

• The bill provides explicit authority to CFIUS to require mitigation agreements.

• Among the factors CFIUS must consider in its review are the impact of the transaction on critical infrastructure, broadly defined, as well as energy assets and critical technologies. In the case of foreign-government transactions, CFIUS must also consider the relevant country's compliance with US and multilateral counter-terrorism, non-proliferation, and export control regimes.

• The bill creates specific authority for CFIUS to enforce mitigation agreements. Further, it explicitly establishes CFIUS's "evergreen" authority to reopen a transaction that has been approved if there has been an intentional breach, and no other remedies will suffice.

The bill also requires the publication of regulations that will standardize the filing process, as well as the process by which CFIUS communicates results to parties. And it requires CFIUS to publish guidelines concerning the types of transactions that have presented national security considerations, which could be helpful for companies trying to determine whether to make the so-called "voluntary" filing decision, especially now that withdrawals will be more closely regulated.

== See also ==
- Committee on Foreign Investment in the United States
- Omnibus Foreign Trade and Competitiveness Act
