= Chile–United States Free Trade Agreement =

Free trade agreement

Chilean exports to the US, 1995-2010

The United States-Chile Free Trade Agreement is a free trade agreement (FTA) between the United States and Chile signed on June 6, 2003. The pact came into force on January 1, 2004. On that date, tariffs on 90% of U.S. exports to Chile and 95% of Chilean exports to the United States were eliminated. The agreement also established that Chile and the U.S. will establish duty-free trade in all products within a maximum of 12 years (2016). In 2009, bilateral trade between the United States and Chile reached US$15.4 billion, a 141% increase over bilateral trade levels before the U.S.-Chile FTA took effect. In particular, U.S. exports to Chile in 2009 showed a 248% increase over pre-FTA levels.

== History ==
The first steps toward a trade agreement between the two countries began in 1992 when U.S. President George H. W. Bush agreed with Chile's President Patricio Aylwin to "want to pursue free-trade negotiations as quickly as that is feasible." At the 1994 Summit of the Americas U.S. President Bill Clinton, Canada's Prime Minister, Jean Chrétien, and Ernesto Zedillo, the President of Mexico, had agreed to admit Chile to the North American Free Trade Agreement (NAFTA). In February 1997 Chile's President Eduardo Frei Ruiz-Tagle visited the U.S. Congress and declared his support for his country to join NAFTA. However, NAFTA expansion could not be accomplished because the Clinton administration failed to obtain “fast-track” negotiation abilities from the U.S. Congress. Meanwhile, Chile signed a pact with Canada in 1996 and with Mexico in 1998.

On August 1, 2002, the U.S. Senate granted fast-track authority to President George W. Bush to negotiate a free trade agreement with Chile and other countries. On December 11, 2002, the U.S. Trade Representative Robert Zoellick announced it had reached an FTA agreement with Chile. On January 30, 2003, President Bush notified the U.S. Congress of his intention to sign the treaty within 90 days.

Negotiations were complicated by Chile's opposition to an imminent U.S. invasion of Iraq. U.S Trade Representative Robert Zoellick stated that both President Bush and the U.S. Congress were "disappointed" by Chile's lack of support in the Iraq war and said there was no set time-frame for a signing of the pact. On April 23, 2003 U.S Secretary of State Colin Powell said the FTA would be signed and approved but they were looking for the appropriate moment to submit it to Congress. On May 7, 2003, President Bush said the "important FTA with Chile would go ahead".

The treaty was finally signed on June 6, 2003, at the Vizcaya Palace in Miami by Chile's Foreign Affairs Minister Soledad Alvear and Zoellick. It was ratified by the U.S. House of Representatives on July 24, 2003, by a vote of 270–156, and ratified by the U.S. Senate on July 31, 2003, by a vote of 65–32. It was ratified by the Chamber of Deputies of Chile on October 7, 2003, by a vote of 87–8, and ratified by the Senate of Chile on October 22, 2003, by a vote of 34–5. The treaty was promulgated by President Bush on September 3, 2003, and by Chilean President Ricardo Lagos on December 4, 2003.

== Provisions ==
The text of the Free Trade Agreement is divided into twenty-five sections, listed and summarized as follows:

=== Preambles ===
A summary of political goals of the agreement, including “CONTRIBUTE to hemispheric integration and the fulfillment of the objectives of the Free Trade Area of the Americas”

=== Initial Provisions ===
Relate objectives of the agreement.

=== General Definitions ===
This chapter lays the framework for the FTA and sets definitions to be used throughout the agreement in order to assure uniformity.

=== National Treatment and Market Access for Goods ===
Define tariffs and customs general regulation, safeguards, and equivalences of nomenclatures for several goods. Chile eliminate tariffs immediately on pork and pork products, beef offal, durum wheat, barley, barley malt, sorghum, soybeans and soybean meal, pasta, breakfast cereals, cereal preparations, and sunflower seeds. Access for beef on both sides will be liberalized over 4 years, beginning with a 1,000-metric-ton quota, a 10-percent annual growth factor, and a linear phase-out of the out-of-quota tariff rate. Access for poultry on both sides will be completely liberalized over 10 years Chile's duty on many dairy products, including skim milk powder, whey, and cheeses, will be eliminated in 4 years; duties on other dairy products will be eliminated in 8 years. Tariffs on U.S. and Chilean wines are being progressively harmonized down to the lowest wine tariff rate and will be eliminated by 2016.

Higher effective tariffs will remain for wheat, wheat flour, and sugar during the 12 year transition period under the FTA due to the application of an import price band system.

=== Rules of Origin and Origin Procedures ===
The FTA employs product-specific rules of origin similar to those contained in the NAFTA, defining the general rule to consider a good as affected for the agreement when “the good is wholly obtained or produced entirely in the territory of one or both of the Parties” distinguish it from “simple combining or packaging operations” that are not covered by this FTA.

=== Customs Administration ===
Regulate custom operation in terms of timing, penalties, information, and others. Established three years for adapt Chilean custom procedures.

=== Sanitary and Phyto-Sanitary Measures ===
Chile following US phytosanitary demands.

=== Technical Barriers to Trade ===
Establish cooperation on regulatory issues, such as equivalence of technical regulations and standards.

=== Trade Remedies ===
Define standards and conditions for safeguard measures.

=== Investment ===
Establish “national treatment” for investors of the other party, compromising a treatment no less favorable, in like circumstances, to its own investors. The same criterion is defined for services, including financial.

=== Telecommunications ===
Compromise each party to ensure that enterprises of the other Party have access to and use of any public telecommunications service offered in its territory, on reasonable and non-discriminatory terms and conditions, including buy enterprises of this area.

=== Temporary Entry for Business Persons ===
Facilitate temporary entry for business persons, excluding citizenship, nationality, permanent residence, or employment on a permanent basis

=== Electronic Commerce ===
Eliminate any customs duties on digital product from parties.

=== Competition Policy, Designated Monopolies, and State Enterprises ===
Regulate procedures to designate monopolies that could affect the other party, including state enterprises.

=== Intellectual Property Rights ===
Strengths compromises from Chile in terms of copyright and control of piracy.

=== Labor ===
Reaffirm obligations as members of the International Labor Organization (ILO) and compromises domestic labor law enforcement

=== Environment ===
Establish an Environment Affairs Council with representatives of the Parties, which shall meet at least once a year, to discuss environmental issues related with the agreement.

=== Transparency ===
Regulate communication between parties.

=== Final Provisions ===
Including annexes, measures and side letters.

== Views in favor of U.S.-Chile FTA ==
Proponents of the US-Chile FTA claim that the reduction in trade barriers brought on by the pact will lead to an increase in trade between the two countries.

- USTR Site on Chile FTA
- American Enterprise Institute 2006 Event: "U.S.-Chile Free Trade Agreement: Building on Success"

== Views opposed to the U.S.-Chile FTA ==
=== Environment and social issues ===
Opponents of the US-Chile FTA claim that it will worsen Chile's over-dependence on scarce natural resource exports, and contribute to worsening inequality in both countries.

=== Labor ===
In this topic critics point out the agreement's weakness of effectively realizing its commitments. For instance, the agreement doesn't consider sanctions for weakening or violating domestic labor laws.

=== Quotas and regulatory issues ===
Opponents of the US-Chile FTA claim that it will worsen Chile's over-dependence on scarce natural resource exports, and contribute to worsening inequality in both countries. The former Chilean minister of foreign relations, Hernán Errázuriz questioned whether the accord should “even be called a free trade agreement” because it “contains quotas for many products, allows the United States to retain broad antidumping attributes and does not control the damage of billions of dollars in distorted agricultural subsidies.”

=== Short-term capitals’ regulation ===
The U.S. House Representative Barney Frank, criticizes the agreement for their deregulation over short-term capital flows, a key factor for Chile's successful economy.

- Citizens' Trade Campaign Site on Chile FTA

== See more ==
- Rules of Origin
- Market access
- Free-trade area
