= Clean Diamond Trade Act =

2003 American trade act

- Long title: An Act to implement effective measures to stop trade in conflict diamonds, and for other purposes.
- Acronyms (colloquial): CDTA
- Nicknames: Clean Diamond Trade Act of 2003
- Enacted by: the 108th United States Congress
- Effective: April 25, 2003

Citations
- Public law: 108-19
- Statutes at Large: 117 Stat. 631

Codification
- Titles amended: 19 U.S.C.: Customs Duties
- U.S.C. sections created: 19 U.S.C. ch. 25 § 3901 et seq.

Legislative history
- Introduced in the House as H.R. 1584 by Amo Houghton (R–NY) on April 3, 2003; Committee consideration by House Ways and Means, House International Relations; Passed the House on April 8, 2003 (419-2, Roll call vote 118, via Clerk.House.gov); Passed the Senate on April 10, 2003 (passed unanimous consent) with amendment; House agreed to Senate amendment on April 11, 2003 (agreed); Signed into law by President George W. Bush on April 25, 2003

The Clean Diamond Trade Act (CDTA), signed by United States President George W. Bush on 25 April 2003, implemented the Kimberley Process Certification Scheme (KPCS) to regulate the commercial sale of diamonds. On July 29, 2003, Bush signed Executive Order 13312, which described the implementation of the Clean Diamond Trade act. The act requires that all diamonds imported to the United States or exported from the United States have a Kimberley Process Certificate. The act aims to prohibit the importation of diamonds whose mining fuels conflict in the country of origin.

== H.R. 1415 ==
H.R. 1415 has 13 sections, the first of which names the act as the “Clean Diamond Trade Act”. The Act defines the motivation behind the passage as due to the human rights issues associated with the rough diamond trade. It also addresses previous action that has been taken to address threats due to conflicts coming from rough diamond trade. The act mentions the United Nations Security Council prohibiting states from exporting weapons to countries affected by diamond conflicts, in addition to mandating that states prohibit importation of rough diamonds from Sierra Leone and Liberia (3). The United States subsequently restricted the importation of diamonds to those containing a certificate of origin.

Section 4 describes the measures for the importation and exportation of rough diamonds, addressing prohibition of diamonds not controlled through the KPCS and the ability of the president to waive requirements in certain circumstances. In Section 5, the act discusses the regulatory aspect, emphasizing the importance of keeping full records of anyone attempting to import or export rough diamonds. Section 5c also describes the oversight procedures, but does not specify which Government agency is in charge of conducting annual reviews. Section 6 delegates importing authority to the U.S. Customs and Border Protection and exporting authority to the Bureau of the Census.

Section 8 deals with enforcement, and describes the penalties for violating any aspect of the act. This section specifies a penalty not exceeding $10,000 for anyone who violates an aspect of the act, and not more than $50,000 or 10 years in prison for anyone who willfully violates the act. Section 10 promotes the importance of the executive branch publishing statistics on imports and exports of rough diamonds, and Section 11 mandates that annual reports be released every 12 months, although it does not specify who will be compiling these reports to give to congress. Section 12 states that 2 years after the effective date of the act, the Comptroller General of the United States will submit a report on the effectiveness of the act, in addition to any recommendations of modifications to the act.

== Background information ==
=== History ===
It is estimated that around 3.7 million people in Africa have died as a result of wars funded by conflict diamonds. Failed elections, money laundering, civil wars (in Angola, Liberia, and other parts of Africa) etc. have encouraged a significant amount of illegal gem sales, with profits aiding rebel forces like the Revolutionary United Front and the National Union for the Total Independence of Angola (UNITA) and allowing for the continuation of civil unrest. Though reports differ, it is estimated UNITA produced about $600 million in diamonds annually in the late 1990s. These funds are used for foreign representation, travel, commodity procurement, and arms purchases, among other things. Angola's decades-long civil war looked as though it was ending in 1992, when its first multi-party democratic elections were held, but UNITA leader Jonas Savimbi declared the election "neither free nor fair" after he lost, and the fighting resumed. (The United States, under the Ronald Reagan administration and his successor, George H. W. Bush, had strongly supported Savimbi and the UNITA rebels in the late 1970s as he advocated for democracy and freedom during the Cold War.) The United Nations took several steps to attempt to discipline these rebel actions, including restricting travel of UNITA senior officials, and prohibiting the sale of petroleum and related products from any country to Angola through United Nations Security Council Resolution 864. United States president Bill Clinton issued executive order 12865 to add U.S. sanctions in addition to the UN's efforts. In 1998 UNITA repealed another peace treaty and returned to war with the Angolan army, prompting the United Nations Security Council to investigate sanctions-busting operations and helping focus international attention on the link between diamonds and conflict in Africa.

On 28 November 2000, in Gaborone, Botswana, negotiators for dozens of diamond exporting and importing countries ended over a year of negotiations and agreed on the elements of an international certification program, which would become the Kimberley Process Certification Scheme, adopted by the UN at their 79th plenary meeting on 1 December. The Washington Times wrote, "If the White House fails to immediately shore up the legislation, blood diamonds will symbolize Mr. Clinton's stained legacy in Africa"; especially because, as "the world's largest diamond jewelry market", the United States had more of a responsibility to take initiative in supporting the KPCS and in the CDTA legislation. Without US support, the rest of the world had much less incentive to join the program.

=== Kimberley Processing Certification Scheme ===
The KPCS system was implemented by the bill as the main deterrent to blood diamonds. Participating countries and industries and civil society observers meet twice each year to improve and refine the systems that have led diamonds to be one of the most monitored and audited natural resources in the world. Participation is open to all who "are willing and able to fulfill [its] requirements": diamonds must be transported in tamper proof containers with a government validated certificate as to authenticate their origins. It was able to reduce the ease with which conflict diamonds entered the legitimate diamond market within its first few years of implementation. But, membership in the system is voluntary, so non-compliance is a constant issue. The Republic of Congo, Côte d'Ivoire, and Venezuela were all accused of violations and expelled from the scheme in the mid-2000s; since then, Congo has been reinstated as a full participant, but Côte d'Ivoire and Venezuela were demoted to members. They are allowed to trade rough diamonds with KPCS participants, but not with non-members.

Reports submitted to the United Nations Security Council in October 2002 charge that both the Angolan rebel leader, Mr. Jonas Savimbi, and the Liberian government still violate the trade and weapons bans with the help of a global network of arms dealers, diamond merchants and natural resources companies. Other logistical issues continue to hinder the success of the KPCS. Terrorist organizations can transport diamonds over borders without detection and convert them back into banknotes whenever they need the money. Leaders have to use discretion when increasing sanctions, because though they help to discourage conflict diamonds, they can also stunt the growth and development necessary for the countries' fragile economies. "It's clear that international traders are always ready to bypass the sanctions and buy diamonds coming from UNITA," UN official Juan Larrain said in 2000.

=== Legislative history ===
The Clean Diamond Trade Act was revised several times before a version of the bill was successfully passed by Congress, and signed into law by the President of the United States. The very first version of the CDTA, H.R 2722, was introduced in the US House of Representatives by Rep.Amo Houghton, a Republican from New York on September 2, 2001, to the 107th Congress. There were 112 cosponsors: 84 Democrats, 27 Republicans, 1 Independent. The bill was referred to the House Ways and Means, and then the Subcommittee on Trade. Eventually, the bill was debated on the House Floor. It successfully passed in the House with a vote of 408–6 on Nov.28th 2001. The bill was placed on the Senate Legislative calendar, but no further action was taken.

In 2002, Sen. Dick Durbin of Illinois introduced a version of the bill in the Senate with 11 Co-sponsors: 8 Democrats, 2 Republicans, 1 Independent. The bill was read twice in the Senate and was ultimately referred to the Committee on Finance. The committee went no further with the bill. The bill never made it to the Senate Floor, and no vote was taken.

On March 25, 2003, Rep. Amo Houghton reintroduced the CDTA, as H.R 1415, to the 108th Congress. The bill was co-sponsored by 60 members of the House of Representative: 42 Democrats, 17 Republicans, and 1 Independent. The bill was introduced in the House, and referred to the House International Relations, House Ways and Means, and finally to the Subcommittee on Trade. The bill failed to be put up for a vote, and went no further. In the same 108th Congressional Session, Sen. Chuck Grassley, a Republican from Iowa, introduced another version of the bill in the Senate. The bill was entitled S.760, and it was introduced on April 1, 2003, with 20 Co-Sponsors: 13 Democrats, 7 Republicans. The bill was read, and then referred to the Committee on Finance. The Committee passed the bill and it was placed on the Senate Legislative Calendar. However, once the bill reached the floor, the Senate indefinitely postponed it by unanimous consent. This resulted in the bill never being voted on.

On April 3, 2003, Rep. Houghton introduced a similar bill, H.R 1584, to the House of Representatives with 3 co-sponsors: 2 Republicans, 1 Democrat. In Section 4 and 5 of S.760, it states that the President should report to Congress. In Section 4 and 5 of H.R 1584, it states that the President should report to the "appropriate congressional committee". In Section 6 of S. 760, the Secretary of State is responsible for publishing in the Federal Register the required information, but the responsibility was given to the President in H.R 1584. The bill passed with a vote of 419–2 vote. The bill was then sent to the Senate and passed with unanimous consent. The bill was presented to the president April 14, 2003, and it was signed on April 25, 2003, thus becoming law. Section 4 of the new law required President George W. Bush to “prohibit the importation into, or exportation from, the United States of any rough diamond, from whatever source, that has not been controlled through the Kimberley Process Certification Scheme (KPCS)." In order to adhere to this new law, President George W. Bush signed Executive Order 13312.

== Implementation of the act ==
According to a CRS report, the Bush administration began implementing KPCS before the passage of the House of Representatives Bill H.R. 1584 of the 108th congress, which became public law 108–19. The Act, signed under President George H. W. Bush, was set to be in effect until December 31, 2006. In 2006, this was extended to 2012, and in 2009, President Barack Obama confirmed the Waiver Certification to remain in effect through December 31, 2012. It does not appear to have been re-certified after December 31, 2012.

The implementation of the KPCS is coordinated by the State Department's Office of Threat Finance Countermeasures in the Bureau of Economic and Business Affairs. A Kimberley Process Implementation Coordinating Committee was also established in 2003 to implement the act, including officials from the Departments of State, Treasury, Commerce, Homeland Security, and the Office of the United States Trade Representative. The person in charge of coordinating the implementation is U.S. State Department's Special Advisor for Conflict Diamonds, Brad Brooks-Rubin.

There has been some debate over the effectiveness of the trade act, specifically the regulations set in place by KPSC. Some critics argue that the KPCS was set in place to allow consumers to buy diamonds without guilt, as opposed to effectively regulating the diamond market. It is thought that the KPSC doesn't actually address the illegal diamond trade as well as it should. Global Witness decided to leave the KPCS in 2011 due to their dissatisfaction with the ability of KPCS to deal with much of the trade in conflict diamonds. However, others argue that KPCS has made substantial gains in decreasing the illegal market trade. One issue associated with the Clean Diamond Trade Act is that the United States does not inspect rough diamonds coming in or out of the country, so many traders have nothing to deter them from illicit trade. It is suggested that the United States implement more intensive reporting and inspection of rough diamonds to the ensure the success of the trade act.

The United States also lacks an agency in charge of diamond import confirmations, which allows traders to bypass the requirement of reporting the receipt of the diamond shipment within 15 days of the arrival. The U.S. Customs and Border Protection (CBP) is the agency in charge of overseeing incoming diamond shipments and conducting examinations of shipments. There is also little oversight of the U.S. Kimberley Process Authority (USKPA), who are responsible for issuing Kimberley Process certificates, so no one supervises the company making sure that USKPA adheres to KPCS standards. The closest oversight comes from the Department of State, who “convene periodic teleconferences with the USKPA”. The CDTA also does not directly deal with the retail diamond sector, as the Act only applies to rough diamonds as opposed to cut and polished diamonds. While some retailers take strong initiatives to avoid conflict diamonds, many do not, so the effectiveness of the Act to eliminate the trade of conflict diamonds is often questioned. It has also been suggested that other countries have similarly struggled with the implementation of the KPCS.

A Government Accountability Office (GAO) report stated that the law was not enforced. “Because of weaknesses of the system," it said, "the United States cannot ensure that illicit rough diamonds are not traded.” The complete text of the regulations issued by the Department of the Treasury can be publicly accessed. The regulations were most recently amended in May 2008.

=== Reception in the media ===
The Kimberly process operates through voluntary participation, self-examination, and peer-review. The United States is the world's largest diamond market, and in 2001 legislators decided to take action to ban the importation of illegally mined diamonds. Representative Tony P. Hall (D-OH) led on the issue in Congress and introduced the Clean Diamonds Act, H.R. 918, on March 7, 2001, to lessen U.S. involvement in this illicit diamond trade. The bill prohibits individuals or corporations from importing rough diamonds into the United States unless the extracting and intermediary countries utilize export and import controls verifying the legitimacy of the diamonds. H.R. 918 does this by ensuring that the import of diamonds into the United States meets specified requirements that are consistent with United Nations Resolution 55/56 "H.R. 918, Clean Diamonds Act." Resolution 55/56, being the document adopted by the general assembly in 2000 aimed at breaking the link between the transaction of illicit diamonds and armed conflict.

The bill however, faced opposition from the Bush administration, which did not want to create additional trade restrictions, and it did not pass. Following the failure of the Clean Diamonds Act, NGO's used advertising and public demonstrations to link diamonds to the extreme violence in Sierra Leone and other diamond mining countries in order to appeal to ethical consumerism. non-governmental organizations (NGOs) such as Global Witness, Oxfam, Partnership Africa Canada and Amnesty International used gruesome images of victims with their hands and feet cut off along with war images to portray the violence perpetuated by illegal diamond mining in Africa.

In addition to directly targeting diamond vendors, media outlets continued coverage on the global implications of African conflict being fueled by diamonds. In early November 2001, the Washington Post broke the story that conflict diamonds helped finance Al Qaeda, the group responsible for the September 11 attacks on the World Trade Center and the Pentagon in 2001.

== Relevant litigation ==
Only one violation of the Clean Diamond Trade Act has occurred in which the case was appealed. The main court case referencing the CDTA is United States of America vs Approximately 1,170 Carats Of Rough Diamonds Seized At John F. Kennedy International Airport On January 13, 2004. Filed on July 17, 2007, and decided 2008, the case arose from Mark Kalisch attempting to import unregistered rough diamonds from Brazil, without a Kimberley Process Certificate. This directly violated the Clean Diamond Trade Act.

== Data reporting ==
Under the implementation of the CDTA, Census is the authority responsible for collecting, managing, and analyzing data on diamond imports and exports and reporting it to KPCS. In 2003, Census reported that the United States had a greater number of exported diamonds than imported diamonds. Approximately 3 million carats worth of diamonds were exported in the US in 2003, leading, raising a concern on the accuracy and legitimacy of reports of Census reported to the KPCS. Irregularities in the data reported through Census in 2003, are not the first of its occurrence. For example, in 2000 Belgium reported exporting $355 million worth of diamonds to the US, the United States however, only reported importing about $192 million. Census officials have identified anomalies within data results resulting from the misclassification of shipments by individual parties and a method initiated by the Census that altered the value of some shipments as it distorted the quantity of imports and exports based on outdated price data. In the early 2000s for example, polished diamonds were mistakenly sorted as “unsorted” rough diamonds. Steps taken to amend data anomalies on behalf of Census include notifying U.S. Customs of diamond classification problems and educating diamond importers and exporters of the provisions diamonds must meet under the CDTA and proper way to classify diamonds. In 2012, the Census reported that 1,293 Kimberly Process certificates were issued, including countries such as Ukraine, Singapore, and New Zealand. As a result of the implementation of the CDTA in accordance with KPCS, in 2012 Census reported only $462.1million worth of rough diamonds, a 28.5% decrease from the 2011 report of $646.7 million. The Census Bureau in 2012 reported that the United States received rough diamond imports from approximately 24 KP participants including Liberia, Mexico, Democratic Republic of Congo, India, Israel, and Japan. Within the data reports of imports from countries such as these the carat weight and value of the diamonds are also included. To continue to provide the most accurate data the Census compares and checks its monthly data with data it receives from USKPA to ensure that there are no discrepancies between imports and exports.
