= Title 19 of the United States Code =

U.S. federal statutes on customs and duties

Title 19 of the United States Code outlines the role of customs and duties in the United States Code.

- 19 U.S.C. ch. 1—Collection Districts, Ports, And Officers
- 19 U.S.C. ch. 1A—Foreign Trade Zones
- 19 U.S.C. ch. 2—The Tariff Commission (repealed/omitted)
- 19 U.S.C. ch. 3—The Tariff and Related Provisions
- 19 U.S.C. ch. 4—Tariff Act of 1930
- 19 U.S.C. ch. 5—Smuggling
- 19 U.S.C. ch. 6—Trade Fair Program
- 19 U.S.C. ch. 7—Trade Expansion Program
- 19 U.S.C. ch. 8—Automotive Products
- 19 U.S.C. ch. 9—Visual and Auditory Materials of Educational, Scientific, and Cultural Character
- 19 U.S.C. ch. 10—Customs Service
- 19 U.S.C. ch. 11—Importation of Pre-Columbian Monumental or Architectural Sculpture or Murals
- 19 U.S.C. ch. 12—Trade Act of 1974
- 19 U.S.C. ch. 13—Trade Agreements Act of 1979
- 19 U.S.C. ch. 14—Convention on Cultural Property
- 19 U.S.C. ch. 15—Caribbean Basin Economic Recovery
- 19 U.S.C. ch. 16—Wine Trade
- 19 U.S.C. ch. 17—Negotiation and Implementation of Trade Agreements
- 19 U.S.C. ch. 18—Implementation of Harmonized Tariff Schedule
- 19 U.S.C. ch. 19—Telecommunications Trade
- 19 U.S.C. ch. 20—Andean Trade Preference
- 19 U.S.C. ch. 21—North American Free Trade
- 19 U.S.C. ch. 22—Uruguay Round Trade Agreements
- 19 U.S.C. ch. 23—Extension Of Certain Trade Benefits To Sub-Saharan Africa
- 19 U.S.C. ch. 24—Bipartisan Trade Promotion Authority
- 19 U.S.C. ch. 25—Clean Diamond Trade
- 19 U.S.C. ch. 26—Dominican Republic-Central America Free Trade
- 19 U.S.C. ch. 27—Bipartisan Congressional Trade Priorities and Accountability
- 19 U.S.C. ch. 28—Trade Facilitation and Trade Enforcement
- 19 U.S.C. ch. 29—United States–Mexico–Canada Agreement Implementation

== See also ==
- Customs
