= Omnibus Trade and Competitiveness Act =

1988 United States law

Omnibus Trade and Competitiveness Act of 1988
- Long title: An Act to enhance the competitiveness of American industry, and for other purposes.
- Nicknames: Agricultural Competitiveness and Trade Act of 1988
- Enacted by: the 100th United States Congress
- Effective: August 23, 1988

Citations
- Public law: 100-418
- Statutes at Large: 102 Stat. 1107

Codification
- Titles amended: 19 U.S.C.: Customs Duties
- U.S.C. sections created: 19 U.S.C. ch. 17 § 2901 et seq.

Legislative history
- Introduced in the House as H.R. 4848 by Dan Rostenkowski (D-IL) on 16 June 1988; Committee consideration by House Agriculture, House Armed Services, House Banking, Finance, and Urban Affairs, House Education and Labor, House Foreign Affairs, House Government Operations, House Energy and Commerce, House Judiciary, House Merchant Marine and Fisheries, House Public Works and Transportation, House Rules, House Small Business, House Science, Space and Technology, House Ways and Means; Passed the House on 13 July 1988 (376–45); Passed the Senate on 3 August 1988 (85–11); Signed into law by President Ronald Reagan on 23 August 1988

The Omnibus Trade and Competitiveness Act of 1988 is an act passed by the United States Congress and signed into law by President Ronald Reagan.

== History ==
During the 1970s, the U.S. trade surplus slowly diminished and turned into an increasing deficit. As the deficit increased through the 1980s, some of the blame fell on the tariffs placed on US products by foreign countries, and the lack of similar tariffs on imports into the United States. Workers, unions and industry management all called for government action against countries with an unfair advantage.

The Omnibus Trade and Competitiveness Act started as an amendment proposed by Rep. Dick Gephardt (D-MO) to order the executive branch to thoroughly examine trade with countries that have large trade surpluses with the United States. If the trade surpluses continued, the offending country would be faced with a bilateral surplus-reduction requirement of 10%. Because of its style of zero-sum game thought, it is considered by economists to be a modern form of mercantilism.

== Expiration ==
The act was signed into law by President Reagan, slightly less strict than proposed, as the Omnibus Trade and Competitiveness Act of 1988. It expired in 1991 and was not renewed until 1994 by President Bill Clinton. It again expired in 1997 and was renewed once more by Clinton in 1999, and was followed by the Trade Act of 2002.

== See also ==
- Trade Act of 2002
- Currency manipulator
- Exon-Florio Amendment
