= Intellectual Property Enforcement Act of 2007 =

- Long title: Intellectual Property Enforcement Act of 2007

Codification
- Acts amended: United States Code, Trademark Act of 1946
- Titles amended: Title 17 of the United States Code and Title 18 of the United States Code
- U.S.C. sections created: "§2323 of Title 18 of the United States Code"
- U.S.C. sections amended: Section 504, 506, Title 17 of the United States Code

Legislative history
- Introduced in the Senate as S.2317 by Patrick Leahy (D-VT) on 11/7/2007; Committee consideration by United States Senate Committee on the Judiciary on 11/7/2007

The Intellectual Property Enforcement Act of 2007, or S.2317, was a bill proposed in the 110th session of the United States Congress that would strengthen intellectual property laws in the United States by amending titles 17 and 18 of United States Code as well as the Trademark Act of 1946. It was written by Senator Patrick Leahy (D-VT) and co-sponsored by John Cornyn (R-TX) and Arlen Specter (D-PA). Primarily, the bill would allow the Department of Justice to press civil charges against file-sharers and award restitution to the copyright owner. This is the third time similar legislation has gone through the United States Senate without passing.

== Background ==
In 1997, the No Electronic Theft Act (NET Act) allowed prosecutors to press criminal charges against those found to be infringing copyright. Since its inception, the federal government has been hesitant to press charges, even in cases such as Capitol v. Thomas due to the difficulty of making criminal charges stick. Additionally, the Department of Justice has noted that arresting file-sharing teens is not a priority. Assistant Attorney General for Antitrust Hewitt Pate was quoted as saying, "The Justice Department is there to enforce the law, there's something to be said for those who help themselves."

In March 2004, Attorney General John Ashcroft formed an Intellectual Rights Taskforce that aimed to address the growing concerns of intellectual property law and copyright in the emerging digital landscape. Ashcroft was urged by numerous congressmen to tackle the growing number of file-sharers within the United States. The goals of the Taskforce were to promote legislation and implement various means of preventing intellectual property theft.

Also in 2004, Senators Orrin Hatch (R-UT) and Patrick Leahy (D-VT) introduced the Protecting Intellectual Rights Against Theft and Expropriation Act of 2004, or the PIRATE Act. The bill proposed for the Department of Justice to partake in civil suits against file-sharers on behalf of copyright holders. The goal was to lessen the requirements needed for a criminal suit, as seen in the NET Act. The bill failed to pass in the United States House of Representatives and faced controversy for allowing the copyright holders to press their own charges in addition to the civil charges, which would enable the file-sharer to face persecution twice. Leahy and Hatch also proposed the INDUCE Act a few months after the PIRATE Act, which also failed to pass in the House.

== Text of the Bill ==
=== United States Code ===
The bill makes specific amendments to title 17 of the United States Code which addresses copyright law. The bill allows civil penalties for violations of section 506 of title 17. Restitution shall be determined by section 504, and equivalent to the amount that would be determined by section 3663(a)(1)(B) of title 18. The penalty would be offset by any award of damages filed in a civil suit subsequent to the initial case. Section 509, which addresses forfeiture, destruction, and restitution would be repealed.

Crime and criminal punishment outlined in title 18 includes numerous small amendments to section 1834, which adds section 2323 to give additional coverage on forfeiture, destruction, and restitution. The section notes that property prohibited under sections 506 or 1204 of title 17, and 2318, 2319, 2319A, 2319B, or 2320, or chapter 90 of title 18 are subject to forfeiture as well as destruction after court proceedings. Restitution is mandatory to the victim should a conviction be issued.

The bill also creates a stronger Federal Bureau of Investigation presence by establishing a unit to work with the Computer Crime and Intellectual Property section of the Department of Justice that would have at least 2 agents investigating each case. It also constructs an annual program that FBI agents would be required to attend in order to handle issues of compromised intellectual property. The FBI would also allot one agent to each Hong Kong and Budapest to assist in the program.

The budget for these implementations totaled $12 million. An additional $10 million was allotted to both the Director of the FBI and the Attorney General for the Criminal Division of the Department of Justice for training, tools, and investigative causes.

=== The Trademark Act of 1946 ===
Changes to this bill included additional protection to seized records of copyright and trademark to ensure that any confidential information is not given out.

== Lobbying ==
The Recording Industry Association of America (RIAA) is one of the largest lobbyers for pro-copyright law in the United States. In 2007, the RIAA spent $2 million on lobbying in support of tougher copyright laws. The RIAA is also a member of the Copyright Alliance, which aims to support those who work in the creative industries.

Some of the largest groups that lobbied for the bill included:

- Motion Picture Association of America (MPAA)
- Sony Corporation
- Magazine Publishers of America
- Vivendi
- Warner Music Group
- Microsoft Corp
- National Music Publishers Association
- News Corp
- General Electric
- Songwriters Guild of America
- Time Warner
- United States Chamber of Commerce
- Walt Disney Company
- Verizon Communications
- Johnson & Johnson

Many smaller organizations from various industries, such as pharmaceuticals, software, car manufacturing, and telecommunications, also supported the bill.

File-sharing and P2P networks like Bearshare, Grokster, and Morpheus lobbied against the bill with the help of lobbying firm P2P United. In 2003, the executive director of the group, Adam Eisgrau stated, "It is long past time for the 'Tyrannosaurical' recording industry to stop blaming and suing its customers to cover up the industry's own glaring failures to adapt yet again to a new technology, one that should have already been making millions for it, and for the average artist." During this time, he also noted that many P2P sharing sites were willing to collaborate with entertainment industries to find a better solution to the problem.

== Controversy ==
The bill was criticized for its support of copyright holders, since it allows the Justice Department to fight on their behalf. It also eradicates the burden of proof required in criminal cases, making a suit less of a risk to the government while taking away the need for the holder to pursue their own litigation.

Senator Leahy was also criticized in 2004 for receiving $178,000 in contributions from entertainment forces. As of 2010, Senator Leahy still obtains a majority of his funding from entertainment and computing industries.

== Related Legislation ==
In July 2007, Representative Steve Chabot (R-OH) proposed the Intellectual Property Enhanced Criminal Enforcement Act of 2007, or H.R.3155, with the co-sponsorship of Representatives Phil English (R-PA), Jim Gerlach (R-PA) and Marilyn N. Musgrave (R-CO). In August 2007, it was sent to the House Subcommittee on Crime, Terrorism, and Homeland Security where it did not pass. This bill also intended to amend titles 17 and 18 of United States Code.

In 2008, the United States Government finally found success with the PRO-IP Act, which combines elements of the Intellectual Property Enforcement Act of 2007 and other previous legislation.

== See also ==
=== Court Cases ===
- Sony BMG Music Entertainment v. Tenenbaum
- Capitol v. Thomas
- MGM Studios, Inc. v. Grokster, Ltd.

=== Legislation ===
- Protecting Intellectual Property Against Theft and Expropriation Act of 2004
- PRO-IP Act
- Digital Millennium Copyright Act
- Intellectual Property Enhanced Criminal Enforcement Act
- INDUCE Act
- Sonny Bono Copyright Term Extension Act
