= BuysUSA.com =

- Founded: 2002
- Dissolved: October 2005
- Website: www.buysusa.com

BuysUSA.com was a United States-based internet site created to illegally distribute software from companies such as Adobe Systems, Autodesk, and Macromedia.

== History ==
Created in 2002, by Danny Ferrer of Lakeland, Florida. He sold unlicensed software online and gave out false codes to make an enormous profit.

The laser printed software looked legitimate to consumers, but was deeply discounted, said John Wolfe of Business Software Alliance, an industry group.

== Trouble ==
Ferrer purchased for himself numerous airplanes, a fighter-jet simulator, as well as starting an entire flight school of his own: Ferrer Aviation. He also purchased for personal use a Lamborghini, a Hummer, a Mercedes and other luxury vehicles with his profits.

The Federal Bureau of Investigation investigated the site and was ultimately responsible for shutting down the site permanently in October 2005.

== Verdict ==
On Friday, August 25, 2006, Danny Ferrer appeared before U.S. District Court Judge T.T. Ellis III in Alexandria, Virginia. He was told, "You extended your hand into the pockets of these people," and that, "If severe penalties were not attached, people would line up from here to Los Angeles to do what you've done."

Danny Ferrer claimed to the judge that he started selling the software to pay for a feeding tube for his sick wife, but, "there was probably a certain amount of greed." He was soon convicted of conspiracy and copyright infringement, sentenced to six years in prison, and ordered to pay more than $4.1 million in restitution to the damaged companies. He was taken into custody at Coleman Federal Correctional Facility in Florida in December 2006.

Prosecutors said the illegal sales cost the software companies as much as $20 million, but industry representatives said the amount could be higher. "This is the ultimate case," prosecutor Jay V. Prabhu said in court. "This is a case where someone made a lot of money."

Danny Ferrer was given a reduced sentence for his cooperation with the FBI. He agreed not only to give testimony against other illegal distributors of software but to help find them as well. He also filmed a video in conjunction with the Business Software Alliance to alert consumers as to the dangers of purchasing unlicensed software and to deter others from attempting to copy software for profit.

== Companies affected ==
- Adobe Systems
- Autodesk
- Macromedia

== See also ==
- Copyright infringement
