= Operation In Our Sites =

US federal Internet copyright enforcement

National Intellectual Property Rights Coordination Center
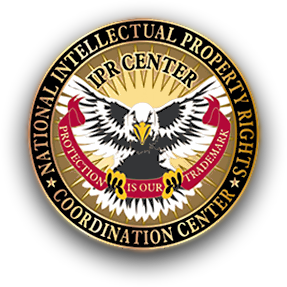

Agency overview
- Formed: 2000
- Jurisdiction: United States
- Employees: 21 partner agencies including 17 key U.S. federal agencies, INTERPOL, EUROPOL and the governments of Canada and Mexico
- Website: www.iprcenter.gov

Footnotes
- NIPRCC leads the Operation in Our Sites initiative

Operation In Our Sites is an ongoing effort by the U.S. government's National Intellectual Property Rights Coordination Center to detect and hinder intellectual property violations on the Internet. Pursuant to this operation, governmental agencies arrest suspects affiliated with the targeted websites and seize their assets including websites' domain names. Web users intending to access targeted websites are directed to the server operated by the U.S. government, and greeted with a graphic bearing the seals of the United States Department of Justice (DOJ), the National Intellectual Property Rights Coordination Center (NIPRCC), and U.S. Immigration and Customs Enforcement (ICE).

== Background ==
=== Legal background ===
In 2008, the Prioritizing Resources and Organization for Intellectual Property Act of 2008 (PRO-IP Act of 2008, H.R. 4279) was established to increase civil and criminal penalties for trademark, patent and copyright infringement. The civil forfeiture provision of 18 U.S.C. § 2323 amended the PRO-IP Act and provided the legal basis of Operation In Our Sites. The provision provides that any property used to commit or facilitate infringement of intellectual property rights would be subject to forfeiture to the United States Government.

=== Policy background ===
To protect their intellectual property, major intellectual property owners and their representatives have strengthened U.S. government enforcement of intellectual property rights. According to the Intellectual Property Enforcement Coordinator (IPEC), which was the position at the White House created by the PRO-IP Act through 15 U.S.C. § 8111 to coordinate U.S. governmental agencies that carry out the law's purpose, several policy rationales informed intellectual property enforcement, including:

- Growth of the U.S. economy, creation of jobs for American workers and support for U.S. exports;
- Promotion of innovation and security of America's comparative advantage in the global economy;
- Protection of consumer trust and safety;
- National and economic security; and
- Validation of rights as protected under U.S. Constitution

NIPRCC also reasoned that Operation In Our Sites would protect consumers' health and safety because Operation In Our Sites targets websites that sell counterfeit medicine.

== Domain name seizure process ==
"Operation In Our Sites was the most aggressive federal enforcement effort ever launched against copyright infringement online...the program would use an unprecedented tactic, site domain seizure, to shut down websites offering copyrighted material."

The domain name seizure process used by Operation In Our Sites was codified in 18 U.S.C. § 981(b)(2), which provides a legal framework for property seizures by the government. Before the seizure, government officials are supposed to investigate suspected websites to find out if they actually purchase or access counterfeit items. The government then contacts the copyright holders to confirm ownership of the intellectual property and suspected infringement. Following the investigation, ICE and NIPRCC officials present the resulting evidence to the U.S. Attorneys, and check the domain name registration.
If the domain name was registered in the U.S., the government petitions a magistrate judge to issue a seizure warrant for the domain name. With the warrant, the domain name's title and rights are transferred to the U.S. government. After the seizure, the government is supposed to send a written notice of the forfeiture deadline to the website operator within 60 days from the seizure date. The website owner can file the claim against the government within 35 days after receiving the notice. If the owner files a claim, the government has 90 days to prove that the property is subject to forfeiture. If the owner does not make a claim against the seizure, or the government successfully proves a valid seizure, the domain name is forfeited to the government.

== Result of domain name seizure ==
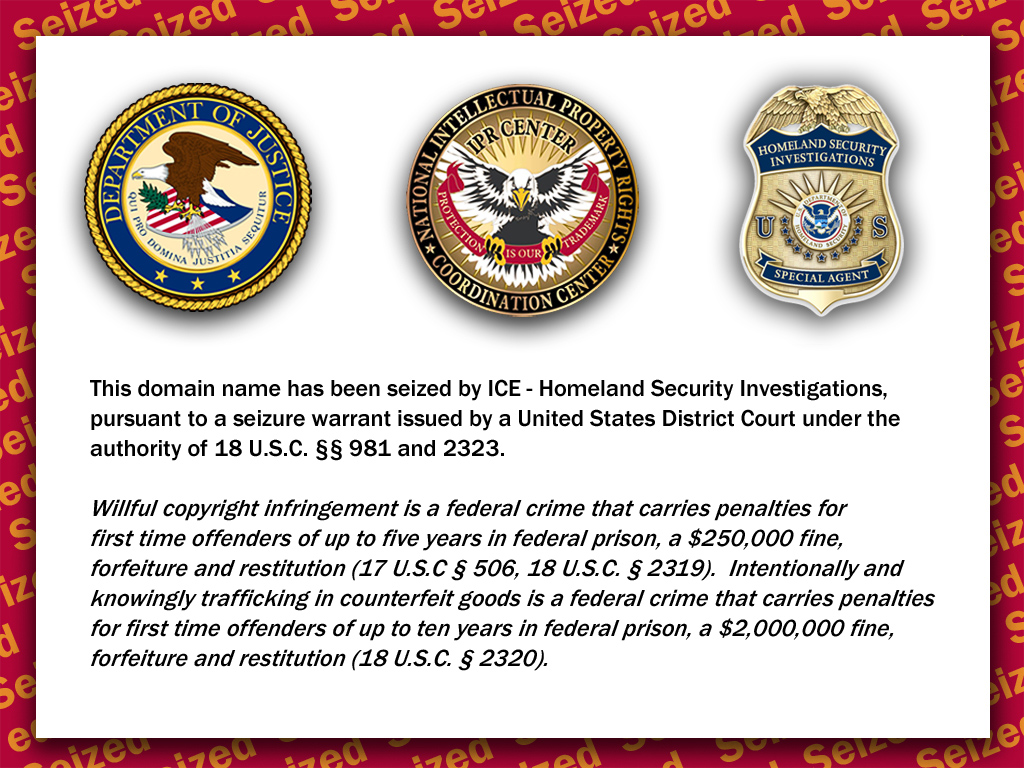
Notice displayed on domains seized November 2011 by DOJ, NIPRCC and ICE

After the seizure the domain name registry alters registered information about the domain name, including the IP address on its domain name server (DNS), as property of the U.S. government. When a user intends to access the website from a domain that has been seized, DNS servers reply with the government server's IP address. Initially a user who attempts to access the targeted website is directed to the governmental server and faced with the agencies' banner; in March 2014 this changed and users are instead redirected to YouTube in order to watch ICE's campaign video.

== Outcome of the Operation In Our Sites ==
It is unclear how effective Operation In Our Sites has been in preventing websites that harm the U.S. economy, but agencies have seized a significant amount of funds and counterfeit goods from targeted websites. In April and May 2012, both DOJ and ICE released figures indicating that they had seized more than $896,000 funds and $1,500,000 counterfeit goods on commercial websites as a part of the Operation In Our Sites.

From June 2010 to late January 2014 the government has seized a total of 2,713 domain names and as of December 2013, the ICE government banners on seized domain names have been viewed more than 122 million times.

=== Project history ===
Project name	Announcement date	Number of domains seized	Location	References
First phase	2010-06-30	9/10	US	
Cyber Monday Crackdown	2010-11-29	82/83	US	
Third phase	2011-02-02	10	US	
Operation Broken Hearted	2011-02-14	18	US	
Fifth phase	2011-05	5	US	
Operation Shoe Clerk	2011-09	17	US	
Operation Strike Out	2011-10-31	58	US	
Cyber Monday 2	2011-11-28	152/156	US	
Ninth phase	2011-12-04	10/12	US	
Operation Fake Sweep	2012-02-02	307/385	US	
	2012-05-11	3	US	
Project Copy Cat	2012-07-12	70	US	
		of which 7	Salt Lake City	
Sustained Effort		11	US	
	2012-08-21	3	US	
Project Bitter Pill	2012-10-04	686	US	
Project Cyber Monday 3	2012-11-26	101	US	
Transatlantic I	2012-11-26	31	EU	
Project Cyber Monday 3	2012-12-20	89	US	
Operation Red Zone	2013-01-31	313	US	
Transatlantic II	2013-06-26	328	EU	
Project Cyber Monday IV	2013-12-02	297	US	
Transatlantic III	2013-12-02	393	EU	
	2013-12-02	16	HK	
Transatlantic IV	2014-06-20	188	EU	
Transatlantic V	2014-12-01	292	EU	
	2014-12-01	29684	US	
Transatlantic VI	2015-11-30	999	EU	
	2015-11-30	37479	US	
Transatlantic VII	2016-11-28	>4500	EU	
	2016-11-28	~15000	EU+US	
Transatlantic VIII	2017-11-27	20520	EU	
	2017-11-27	29865	US	
Transatlantic IX	2018-11-26	33654	EU	
	2018-11-26	~1210000	US	
	2021-12-01	490475	US	

== Criticism and commentary ==
=== Effectiveness for protecting intellectual property ===
Intellectual property owners and their representatives are not surprisingly supportive of Operation In Our Sites to the government, but some critics question the effectiveness of the program since the targeted websites are not actually seized or shut down; the program in effect only increases visitor access to agencies' servers. Accused website operators targeted by this program can circumvent Operation In Our Sites by registering a new domain name, one that cannot be regulated by the U.S., and easily resume operation.

=== Due process critiques ===
In light of the U.S. Constitution, seizures without any opportunity for a hearing are limited to extraordinary situations, but pursuant to Operation In Our Sites, others have pointed out that the government is allowed to seize a targeted domain name without any prior notice to the owner. Other critics have voiced concern that domain name seizures could be used to circumvent the normal legal process in order to target websites that may prevail in full court. In addition, other critics point that Operation In Our Sites' one-sided process inevitably brings mistakes and overly broad seizures.

=== Negative impact on free speech ===
Other critics have argued that seizures of domain through Operation in Our Sites prohibits access to all content on the allegedly infringing websites, and thus has a negative impact on free speech. Some types of targeted websites contained non-infringing speeches and conversation (ex. discussions in a chat-room, conversations in the comment section of blog posts); since the seizure operation redirects all traffic from the website, effects are felt on all material including the legitimate content that should be protected by the First Amendment of the U.S. Constitution.

Moreover, opponents of Operation In Our Sites have criticized ICE for erroneous seizure of non-infringing domain names, and the corresponding violation of the non-infringing domain holder's First Amendment rights. So far, three domain names (dajaz1.com, rojadirecta.com, and rojadirecta.org) have been seized by mistake and returned to their respective owners.

- Dajaz1.com: Dajaz1.com was a popular hip-hop music blog that provided links to pre-released songs sent to Dajaz1.com by legitimate copyright holders for promotional purposes. In late November 2010, at the suggestion of the Recording Industry Association of America (RIAA), ICE alleged that the links to the songs constituted copyright infringement, and seized the domain name pursuant to a warrant granted by a magistrate judge. After the seizure, the domain name owner filed a claim. Although the regular seizure process affords the government a 90-day period before filing a forfeiture claim, the agencies in this case secretly sought a prolonged time period which they acquired from the court, and in this instance the government held the domain name for a year without providing any notice to the owner. In November 2011, ICE returned the domain name to its owner without providing any explanation.
- In the RojaDirecta case, the government seized the domain name because the website's discussion board included links to copyrighted content. After the seizure, Puerto 80, a Spanish company that operates rojadirecta.com and rojadirecta.org unsuccessfully attempted to appeal government authorities to resolve the domain names dispute without lawsuits. Puerto 80 filed a lawsuit, and in August 2012 the Court ordered the government to return the domain names. As in dajaz1.com, the government was criticized in the rojadirecta case for violating free speech, holding domain names for an extended period, and returning the domain names without any apology to the domain owners.

=== Undercutting the DMCA ===
Many domains targeted by Operation in Our Sites, including RojaDirecta and Dajaz1.com, were seized because they provided hyperlinks ("linked") to allegedly infringing material. Critics argue that use of government intervention to prevent websites from linking to infringing materials undercuts the Digital Millennium Copyright Act by eliminating the copyright holders' incentive for interacting cooperatively with OSPs through the DMCA established notice and takedown system. Prior to Operation in Our Sites, copyright holders had to submit takedown notices to OSPs if they wished to have links to copyright protected material removed. OSPs that complied with the takedown notices and the safe-harbor provisions outlined in the Online Copyright Infringement Liability Limitation Act received relief from the financial burden of legal fees, and damages associated with claims of secondary liability for copyright infringement. If copyright holders forgo the notice and takedown provisions outlined in the DMCA and instead elect for direct government intervention through organizations like ICE, then the government may end up with sole responsibility for policing websites that link to copyright protected material. Furthermore, website owners will no longer have the ability to correct and improved wrongs without potentially facing criminal proceedings.

=== Website owner lack of awareness ===
Hana Beshara, the public face and co-founder of NinjaVideo, was familiar with the Digital Millennium Copyright Act and expected that her NinjaVideo website would be subjected to DMCA takedown notices from copyright holders in response to infringing links on NinjaVideo; she was shocked when her house was raided by Immigration and Customs Enforcement Officers. Following the raid Beshara pleaded guilty to criminal copyright infringement and was sentenced to 22 months in prison, 2 years of probation and a hefty fine.

=== Lobbying by the media industry ===
In an article published in the bimonthly political magazine The American Prospect, the author proposes that lobbying efforts on behalf of the media industry played a critical role in the adoption and implementation of Operation in Our Sites. The article further asserts that in the year prior to inception of Operation In Our Sites, large media conglomerates began providing ICE agents with lists of potential targets for the first round of raids. ICE was for some time responsible for regulating and eliminating sales of counterfeit merchandise, but pressure from the entertainment industry, through lobbying and other efforts, expanded the agency's function to include enforcement against piracy. Lobbying spending by the TV, music and movie industry did in fact increase dramatically from 2004 to 2010; it peaked at $123 million in 2011, then dropped to around $118 million where it stayed from 2012 to 2013.

== See also ==
- Anti-Counterfeiting Trade Agreement
- Combating Online Infringement and Counterfeits Act
- Digital Millennium Copyright Act
- ICANN
- NinjaVideo
- Operation Protect Our Children
- SOPA
- VeriSign
- United States v. Scheinberg
