= IIPA =

The abbreviation IIPA may refer to:

- International Intellectual Property Alliance, an alliance of trade associations in the "copyright-based industries" of the United States
- Intelligence Identities Protection Act, a 1982 United States law that makes it a crime to intentionally reveal the identity of a covert agent in a U.S. intelligence agency
- Imperial India Pale Ale
- Indian Institute of Public Administration, New Delhi.
