= BSAA =

BSAA may refer to:

- British South American Airways
- Business Software Association of Australia, which is now Business Software Alliance Australia
- Bioterrorism Security Assessment Alliance, a fictional counter-terrorism government agency in the Resident Evil franchise
