= Victoria Espinel =

American civil servant (born 1968)

Victoria A. Espinel
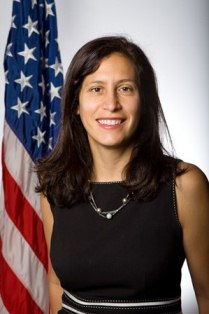
- Victoria Espinel official White House photo
- Born: Victoria Angelica Espinel; 16 October 1968 (age 58); Richmond, Virginia, United States
- Education: Georgetown University, London School of Economics (LM, JD, BS)
- Occupations: president and chief executive of BSA (The Software Alliance)
- Spouse: John Stubbs

Victoria Angelica Espinel (born October 16, 1968) is the president and chief executive of the software industry trade group BSA (The Software Alliance).

Prior to this, she was the United States Intellectual Property Enforcement Coordinator for the White House, housed in the Office of Management and Budget. She was appointed to the position by Barack Obama on September 25, 2009, and her appointment was unanimously confirmed by the U.S. Senate on December 3, 2009. She stepped down in August 2013. Espinel was the first person to fill the position. She was responsible for the development and implementation of the President's overall strategy for the enforcement of intellectual property. Espinel has been referred to as the "IP Czar" by numerous media outlets including National Journal, TechDirt and Intellectual Property Watch

Espinel holds a Master of Law from the London School of Economics (earned in 1997), a Juris Doctor from Georgetown University Law School (earned in 1992), and a Bachelor of Science in Foreign Service from the Georgetown University School of Foreign Service (earned in 1989).

Before joining the Office of the U.S. Trade Representative, Espinel was with the law firms of Covington & Burling in London and Washington, D.C., and Sidley Austin in New York City. She also served as an advisor to Romulus Global Issues Management and is a member of the Brain Trust of the Global Innovation Forum.

In 2001, Espinel joined the Office of the U.S. Trade Representative as the senior counsel for intellectual property issues.

In 2005, Espinel was asked to serve as the first Assistant United States Trade Representative for Intellectual Property and Innovation at the Office of the U.S. Trade Representative, creating the office of Intellectual Property and Innovation at USTR and serving as the chief U.S. trade negotiator for intellectual property and innovation. While at USTR, she testified on numerous occasions before the House Judiciary Committee and the Senate Committee on Homeland Security and Governmental Affairs.

From 2007 to 2009, Espinel was a Visiting assistant professor at the George Mason University School of Law. Her areas of teaching and research were intellectual property and international trade. While at George Mason, she acted as an advisor on intellectual property issues to the staff of the Senate Judiciary Committee, Senate Finance Committee, House Judiciary Committee and House Ways and Means Committee.

In 2009, Espinel founded Bridging the Innovation Divide, a not-for-profit foundation focused on addressing the "innovation divide" and empowering all Americans to obtain the full benefit of their creativity and ingenuity.

== Work as IPEC ==
Espinel was confirmed as the Intellectual Property Enforcement Coordinator on December 3, 2009. This new position was created by Congress through the PRO-IP Act (Prioritizing Resources and Organization for Intellectual Property Act) of 2008. A hearing to consider President Obama's nomination was held on November 4, 2009. On November 19, 2009, the Judiciary Committee ordered the nomination reported to the Senate for consideration. Espinel received eleven letters of in support of the nomination from related organizations including the MPAA, the Copyright Alliance, and the United States Chamber of Commerce. As the IPEC, Espinel has stated she has a singular objective: develop and implement a comprehensive, unified approach to IP enforcement for the U.S. government.

In June 2010, Espinel introduced the Joint Strategic Plan on Intellectual Property Enforcement In this report Espinel claims to have solicited more than 1,600 public comments and worked with numerous Federal agencies in the development of the plan, the U.S. Department of Agriculture, U.S. Department of Commerce, U.S. Department of Health and Human Services, U.S. Department of Homeland Security, U.S. Department of Justice, and U.S. Department of State, the Office of the U.S. Trade Representative (USTR) and the U.S. Copyright Office.

Espinel's plan aims to improve coordination of law enforcement efforts at the Federal, state and local level, thereby heightening intellectual property regulation which is claimed to create jobs in related sectors. Espinel's plan also sets the groundwork for working with trading partners within international organizations to better enforce American intellectual property rights in the global economy. Finally, Espinel's plan aims to ensure intellectual property security over the internet by encouraging industries to work collaboratively to address unlawful cyberspace activity such as illicit filesharing and illicit online pharmaceutical sales.

This inaugural report was followed by the 2010 and 2011 Annual Reports.

Espinel's efforts have been largely supported by stakeholders including business trade associations such as the U.S. Chamber of Commerce, labor unions including the AFL-CIO and consumer groups such as Public Knowledge. A report in Wired shows that new regulations were largely negotiated between various government agencies (including Ms. Espinel and her agency) and industry trade groups, with little or no public oversight, disclosure, or input from non-industry sources.

In 2013 Espinel resigned from the office and joined the staff of The Software Alliance (BSA) as the president.
