= NinjaVideo =

NinjaVideo was a website created in February 2008 containing links to uploaded videos of TV shows, movies, and documentaries. Since June 30, 2010, the site has been unavailable, as a result of a multinational anti-piracy effort led by the US federal government. At the centre of the takedown, was the U.S. Immigration and Customs Enforcement (ICE) initiative as Operation In Our Sites, citing that they were, "targeting pirate websites run by people who have no respect for creativity and innovation". Federal search warrants were executed at servers in the United States and the Netherlands. At the time of its seizure, the site was visited more than 6 million times a month.

== Arrest and manifesto ==
Long before the arrest of one of the site‘s admins, they printed a manifesto of the site's reasoning for their actions. The manifesto was a transcription of a podcast released on the site early in the life of Ninjavideo. They claimed that inflated prices were to blame.

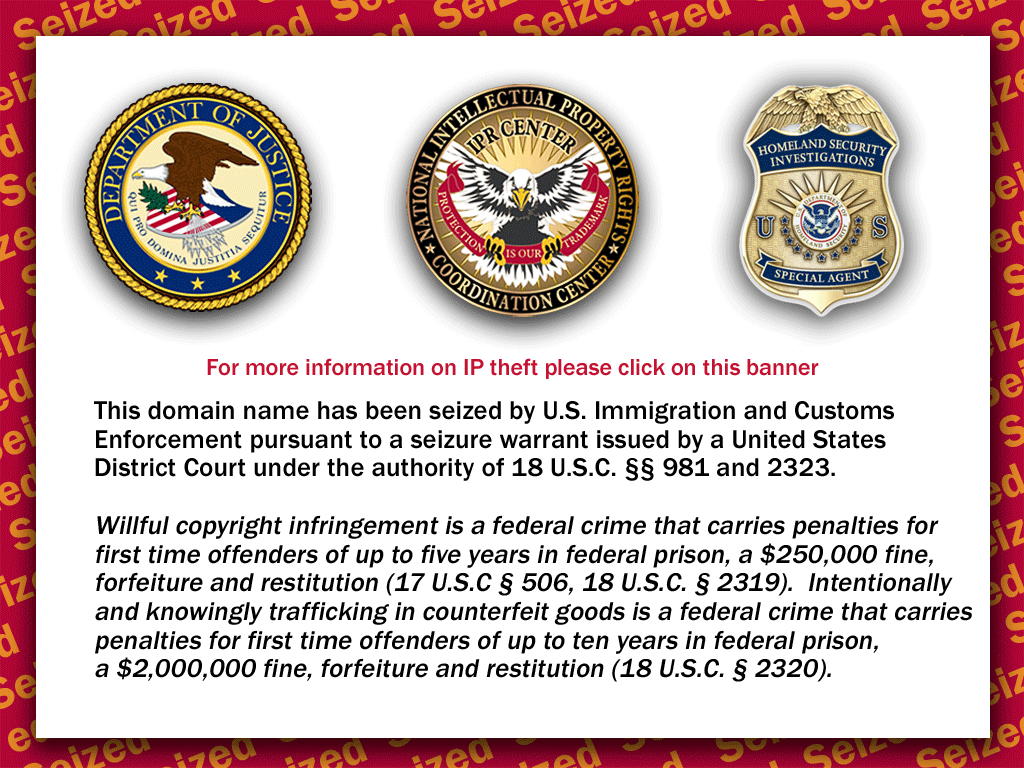
Notice displayed on seized domain by DOJ, NIPRCC and ICE

== Prosecution of NinjaVideo founders ==
Co-founder of NinjaVideo, Matthew David Howard Smith (aka Dead1ne), pleaded guilty to criminal copyright infringement on September 25, 2011. Smith ran the site from 2008 until its shutdown in 2010. According to the government, Smith has admitted to signing ad deals that grossed $500,000 during that period, and he was personally responsible for designing many of the site's features.

Originally optimistic that her actions were in a "gray area" of the law, the co-founder and public face of NinjaVideo, Hana Beshara (Phara), pleaded guilty to conspiracy and criminal copyright infringement on September 30, 2011. "She was sentenced to 22 months in prison, another two years probation after that, 500 hours of community service and she has to pay back the $209,896.95 that she supposedly made from NinjaVideo to the MPAA".

A federal judge sentenced Beshara to 22 months in a West Virginia prison.

Justin A. Dedemeko, another co-founder of NinjaVideo, had also pleaded guilty to uploading content and profiting from the ad revenue that was accrued through the illegal activities of NinjaVideo. He has admitted to making $58,000 through the website and will be forced to pay this back in restitution. He was scheduled to be sentenced on Feb 24, 2012 where he faces a maximum sentence of 5 years in prison.

Two other individuals have pleaded guilty to charges stemming from the operations of this website. Joshua David Evans (Wadswerth) and Jeremy Lynn Andrew pleaded guilty in October 2011 to charges of one count of conspiracy and one count of criminal copyright infringement relating to the release of the movie Iron Man 2.

Another "co-founder" of the website, Zoi Mertzanis (Tik) of Greece, remains at large and a warrant is out for her arrest for her role as an active uploader of content on NinjaVideo.

== See also ==
- Streaming media
