= Software Alliance =

Trade group

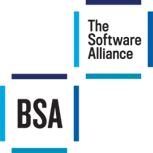
- Formation: 1998
- Location: Washington D.C., United States
- Website: www.bsa.org

The Software Alliance, also known as Business Software Alliance or BSA, is a trade group of business software companies established in 1998. Its principal activity is trying to stop copyright infringement of software produced by its members. It is a member of the International Intellectual Property Alliance. Founded as the Business Software Alliance, it dropped "Business" from its name in October 2012, and styles itself "BSA | The Software Alliance".

BSA members include Adobe, Amazon Web Services, Atlassian, Autodesk, Cloudflare, Cisco, Dropbox, IBM, Microsoft, Nikon, Oracle, SAP, Salesforce, Siemens and Zoom. It is funded through membership dues based on member company's software revenues, and through settlements from companies it successfully brings action against.

Many Microsoft EULAs include a clause requiring users to agree to audits by software companies.

== History ==
In 2013 Victoria Espinel resigned from the office of the United States Intellectual Property Enforcement Coordinator (IPEC) of the Office of Management and Budget and joined the staff of the BSA as its president.

In July 2021, BSA launched a campaign in South East Asia calling on engineering and design firms to commit to using only licensed software in the development of infrastructure projects. The campaign is a continuation of the 2019 regional campaign 'Legalize and Protect' initiative.

The campaign outreach targeted 20,000 firms, including 5,000 each in Indonesia, Philippines, Malaysia, and Thailand. In relation, BSA is partnering with key government agencies across South East Asia to support the campaign. This includes the Optical Media Board of the Philippines, the Ministry of Communication and Informatics of Indonesia, the Ministry of Domestic Trade and Consumer Affairs of Malaysia, and the Royal Thai Police Economic Crime Suppression Division of Thailand.

The campaign includes free consultations and advisory services to assist companies in transitioning to lawful software use. It emphasizes the importance of software licensing for cybersecurity, productivity, and legal protection, particularly in the context of national infrastructure.

Since the campaign's launch, BSA reports that nearly 1 million PCs across ASEAN countries have been upgraded with licensed software.

== Criticism ==
The BSA's enforcement practices against small to medium-sized businesses have been the subject of numerous articles. About 2006, the BSA came under fire for offering reward money up to $200,000 USD to disgruntled employees that report current or former employers for alleged violations of BSA member software licenses.

According to an article in Mother Jones magazine, the BSA discovered in 1995 that Antel, the Uruguayan state-owned telephone company, had copied $100,000 worth of Microsoft, Novell, and Symantec software. The BSA's lawyers in Uruguay quickly filed suit, but dropped the suit in 1997 when Antel signed a "special agreement" with Microsoft to replace all of its software with Microsoft products. This has led to accusations that the BSA is a front for Microsoft, with its other members being enlisted purely to disguise Microsoft's dominant role.

The BSA supported the highly controversial US Stop Online Piracy Act (SOPA). Kaspersky Lab has left the BSA over this.

=== BSA annual software piracy study ===
BSA has been heavily criticized about the yearly study it publishes about copyright infringement of software. This study, produced in collaboration with the International Data Corporation, tries to estimate the level of copyright infringement of software in different countries, as well as the resulting losses for the software industry. The methodology consists in estimating the number of computers shipped in a given country, as well as the average quantity of software installed on these machines. Separately, an estimation of the quantity of legitimate software sold in the country is produced, and the difference between the total amount of software estimated to be in use in the country and the estimation of software sold is used as an indicator of the rate of unauthorized copying. An estimation of the total amount lost is produced by multiplying the estimator number of unauthorized copies by the price of the original software.

These estimates have been criticized as being exaggerated and many flaws of the methodology have been pointed out; some of the figures seem to be guesses rather than solid data, and some data may not be representative. The calculation of the losses, in particular, assumes that each piece of copied software represents a direct loss of sale for software companies, a very contested assumption. The study's assumptions have been described as erroneous in a way "that would get a first year student of statistics into trouble".

These criticisms have been aggravated by the use of the BSA study to lobby for new, stricter copyright laws and to seek tougher penalties for people convicted of copyright infringement on software. In Britain, a judge cited the data provided by the BSA to justify a lengthy prison sentence for two people convicted of copyright infringement.

Another study claiming that software patents are of the same importance to small and medium enterprises and large companies, has been described as misleading and as using a flawed methodology, but the results have nevertheless been quoted by politicians.

== Related organizations ==
- Business Software Association of Australia
- Canadian Alliance Against Software Theft
