= Kiwi Camara =

American lawyer

Kiwi Alejandro Danao Camara (born June 16, 1984), also known as K.A.D. Camara, is a Filipino American attorney and businessman known for being founder and former CEO of CS Disco. He also represented defendant Jammie Thomas-Rasset in the first file-sharing copyright infringement lawsuit in the U.S. brought by major record labels to be tried by a jury. Camara abruptly resigned from CS Disco in September 2023 following accusations of improper sexual conduct.

== Early life and education ==
Kiwi Alejandro Danao Camara was born in Manila, Philippines, to physicians Enrico Camara and Teresa Danao. At age one, his family moved to Cleveland, where he later attended the school Ratner Academy. In 1990, his family relocated to Honolulu, and Camara completed his primary education at the Punahou School. He wrote a medical paper on alternative treatments for rheumatoid arthritis at age 11, which was published in the Hawai'i Journal of Medicine.

At 16, having skipped high school, Camara earned a Bachelor of Science degree in computer science summa cum laude from Hawaii Pacific University (HPU). He completed the program in two years and was recognized by the university for outstanding academic performance. During his time at HPU, he was elected to student government and served as the body's sponsor for the school's first Spring Formal. He was also president of the computer club and earned a silver medal evaluation in ballroom dance.

In 2001, Camara enrolled in Harvard Law School at the age of 17. There he received a John M. Olin fellowship in law and economics. He held the fellowship until September 2004, at which time he took a position as a law clerk for Judge Harris Hartz of the U.S. Court of Appeals for the Tenth Circuit. When he earned his Juris Doctor in 2004 at age 19, Camara became the youngest graduate of Harvard Law School. He played golf, racquetball, soccer, and tennis, and continued to participate in ballroom dance competitions, earning multiple awards for the Harvard-Radcliffe Ballroom Dancing Team.

During his first year at Harvard, Camara's use of an abbreviated racial slur in online course outlines prompted a fellow student to file a complaint and send copies to the Black Law Students' Association; the outlines were removed and Camara apologized. During a Yale Law Journal symposium in 2006, a group of Yale Law students and the school's dean protested Camara's panel participation by walking out to attend the alternative forum "Disempowered Voices in Legal Academia". He said he was "not surprised by or disapproving" of the demonstration, and apologized for any trouble caused by his presence. In 2009, Camara said he was denied jobs because of the incident.

After graduating from Harvard, Camara held a separate John M. Olin fellowship for 2006–2007 and was a visiting scholar at the Northwestern University School of Law. He was previously a John M. Olin fellow at Stanford Law School and briefly a Ph.D. student in economics at Stanford University.

== Career ==
Prior to enrolling at Harvard Law School, Camara completed legal research and worked as an information systems specialist for Cades Schutte Fleming and Wright.

In 2007, he relocated to Houston, where he co-founded the law firm Camara & Sibley with business partner Joe Sibley in 2009. The duo became friends after meeting on their first day attending Harvard, and represented defendant Jammie Thomas-Rasset in the first file-sharing copyright infringement lawsuit in the U.S. brought by major record labels to be tried by a jury. The firm also represented Psystar Corporation in the copyright infringement case Apple v. Psystar (2009).

Camara founded the legal technology company CS Disco in Houston in 2013, and relocated the company's headquarters to Austin, Texas, in 2018. CS Disco went public on the NYSE under the ticker LAW in 2021 at a market cap of almost $2 billion.

In 2022, Camara's total compensation from CS Disco was $110 million, making him the ninth highest paid CEO in the US that year.

On September 11, 2023, CS Disco announced that Camara had resigned as CEO and Board Director. According to a Wall Street Journal news exclusive, then carried by other services, Camara left under duress after being accused of a pattern of sexual harassment and retaliation against female employees, leaving behind compensation in the order of US$100 million in the form of unused stock options.

== Awards and recognition ==
The Philippines awarded Camara its Jose Rizal Certificate of Achievement while he was in college and later, in 2005, recognized him with a Presidential Commendation.

Camara has received several business leadership recognitions during his tenure in the legal technology industry. In 2020, he was named one of the Top 50 SaaS CEOs by The Software Report, recognizing his leadership of the legal technology company CS Disco and its growth in the e-discovery sector. In 2021, the Austin Business Journal recognized him as Best CEO of a Public Company, and he was also honored as a Top CEO at the Greater Austin Business Awards, presented by the Austin Chamber of Commerce.

== Publications ==
- Camara, K.A.D. (2004). "Shareholder Voting and the Bundling Problem in Corporate Law". Wisconsin Law Review. 2004: 1425 – via HeinOnline.
- Camara, K. (2004). "Classifying Institutional Investors". The Journal of Corporation Law. doi:10.2139/SSRN.573441. S2CID 115131573.
- Camara, K.A.D. (January 2005). "Costs of Sovereignty". West Virginia Law Review. 107 (2).
- Camara, K.A.D.; Gowder, Paul (September 2006). "Quasipublic Executives". Yale Law Journal. 115 (9): 2254–2278. doi:10.2307/20455696. JSTOR 20455696.
- Avraham, Ronen; Camara, K.A.D. (2007). "The Tragedy of the Human Commons". Cardozo Law Review. 29 (2): 479–511. SSRN 1022132.

== See also ==
- List of Harvard Law School alumni
- List of Punahou School alumni
