= Section 301 of the Trade Act of 1974 =

US law authorizing retaliation against violations of trade agreements

Section 301 of the US Trade Act of 1974 (19 U.S.C. § 2411) authorizes the president to take all appropriate action, including tariff-based and non-tariff-based retaliation, to obtain the removal of any act, policy, or practice of a foreign government that violates an international trade agreement or is unjustified, unreasonable, or discriminatory, and that burdens or restricts US commerce. Section 301 cases can be self-initiated by the United States Trade Representative (USTR) or as the result of a petition filed by a firm or industry group. If USTR initiates a Section 301 investigation, it must seek to negotiate a settlement with the foreign country in the form of compensation or elimination of the trade barrier. For cases involving trade agreements, the USTR is required to request formal dispute proceedings as provided by the trade agreements. The law does not require that the US government wait until it receives authorization from the World Trade Organization (WTO) to take enforcement actions, and the President is increasingly focused on enforcing intellectual property (IP) rights (under Agreements that may be outside of the WTO) under the "Special" 301 amendments but the US has committed itself to pursuing the resolution of disputes under WTO agreements through the WTO dispute settlement mechanism, which has its own timetable.

== Initiated by USTR or petition ==
Section 301 cases can be self-initiated by the United States Trade Representative (USTR) or as the result of a petition filed by a firm or industry group.

As an amendment by section 1302 of the Omnibus Foreign Trade and Competitiveness Act, Super 301 required the USTR for 1989 and 1990 to issue a report on its trade priorities and to identify priority foreign countries that practiced unfair trade and priority practices that had the greatest effect on restricting US. exports. The USTR then would initiate a Section 301 investigation against the priority countries to obtain elimination of the practices that impeded US exports, in the expectation that doing so would substantially expand US exports.

If USTR initiates a Section 301 investigation, it must seek to negotiate a settlement with a foreign country in the form of compensation or elimination of the trade barrier. For cases involving trade agreements, the USTR is required to request formal dispute proceedings as provided by the trade agreements.

== Consequences ==
If the USTR includes a country on a Special 301 Report watchlist because it has violated a trade agreement, the US government may initiate dispute settlement proceedings at the World Trade Organization (WTO) or any other trade agreement establishing dispute settlement provisions, such as a free trade agreement, such as the North American Free Trade Agreement (NAFTA). The US government can also impose unilateral trade sanctions, such as the Generalized System of Preferences (GSP).

This has happened a number of times with regard to various countries. For example, the United States imposed unilateral trade sanctions on Ukraine under section 301 on December 20, 2001, including tariffs on metals, footwear, and other imports, because the USTR had concluded that Ukraine had failed to enforce copyright in relation to music CDs and their export. Similarly, the Trump administration imposed trade sanctions under section 301 on China in March 2018, setting off the 2018 China–United States trade dispute.

== Super 301 timeline ==
The original Super 301 provisions expired in 1991.

However, President Clinton issued an executive order EO 12901 reactivating Super 301 for two years (1994 and 1995)

The Super 301 process was again extended through 1997 by EO 12973 (September 1995), but was not in operation in 1998.

On March 31, 1999, Super 301 again was re-instated for three years and revised by EO 13116. It required the USTR by April 30 to issue its Super 301 report on priority foreign trade practices and to initiate section 301 cases against such practices if agreement is not reached after 90 days. Neither the USTR's April 1999 or April 2000 Super 301 report identified any priority foreign trade practices under Super 301, but USTR did announce that it would initiate Section 301 cases against trade practices in several countries.

In its April 2001 Super 301 report, USTR did not make any designations under Super 301, but did announce that consultations (the first stage in WTO dispute settlement) had been requested with Mexico on measures affecting live swine imports, with Belgium on rice import restrictions, and with the European Union on import surcharges on corn gluten feed.

In a January 2002 letter report to the Senate Finance Committee on activities under Section 301, the USTR did not identify any priority foreign trade practices under Super 301, although it did report on other activities undertaken under Section 301-310 of the Trade Act of 1974.

== Challenged ==
In the 1990s, Sections 301-310 of the Trade Act were challenged by a number of Members of the World Trade Organization as contrary to the WTO Agreement, but the challenge was rejected. In their report the WTO has ruled (paras. 7.38-7.39) that taking any such actions against other WTO member countries without first securing approval under the WTO Understanding on Rules and Procedures Governing the Settlement of Disputes is, itself, a violation of the WTO Agreement.
