= National Intellectual Property Rights Coordination Center =

U.S. government center

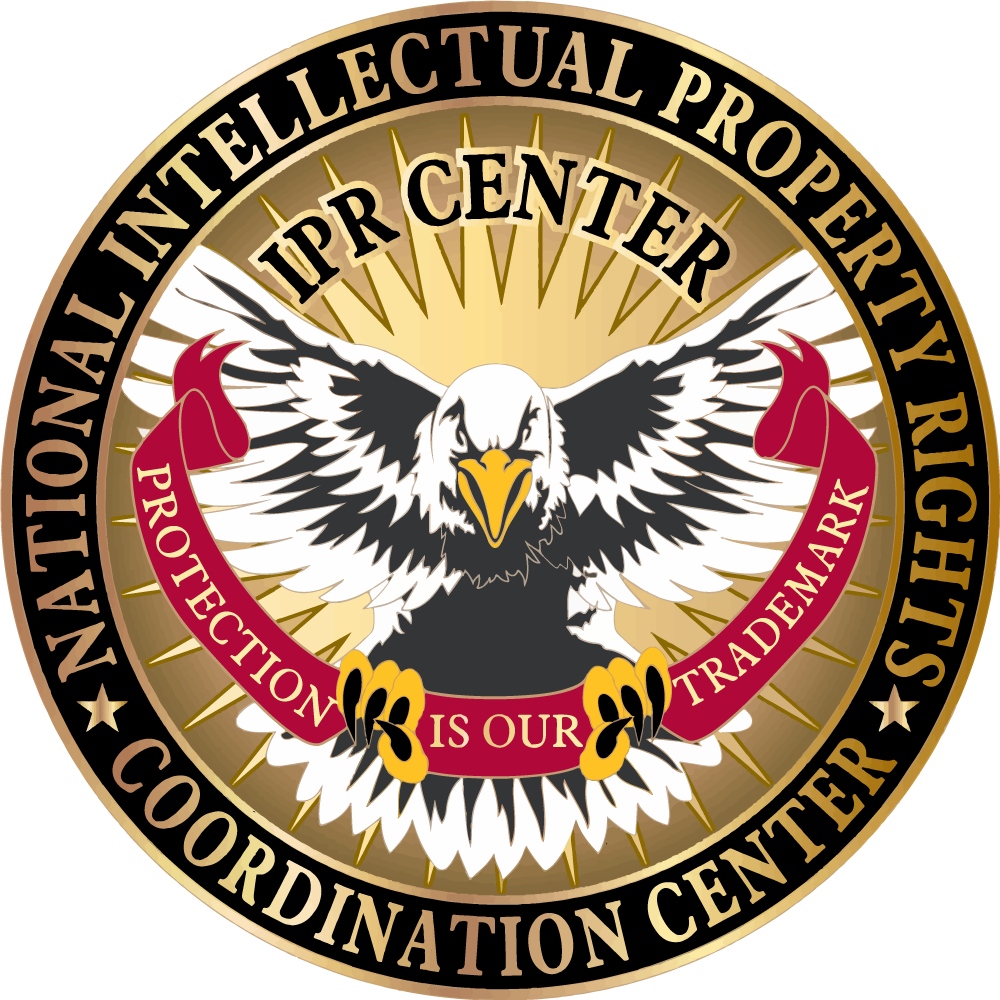

Agency overview
- Formed: 2000 (26 years ago)
- Jurisdiction: United States
- Headquarters: 2451 Crystal Drive, Arlington, VA 22202
- Agency executive: Ivan J. Arvelo, Director of The NIPRCC
- Website: www.iprcenter.gov

The National Intellectual Property Rights Coordination Center (NIPRCC) is a U.S. government center overseen by U.S. Immigration and Customs Enforcement, a component of the U.S. Department of Homeland Security. The NIPRCC coordinates the U.S. government's enforcement of intellectual property laws.

The NIPRCC was created in 2000, under the then-U.S. Customs Service as part of the implementation of the Clinton Administration's 1998 International Crime Control Strategy. The International Crime Control Strategy was developed to address the national security threat of international crime as determined by Presidential Decision Directive (PDD) 42 in 1995.

The NIPRCC hosts representatives from several different government agencies that run in the center's activities. In alphabetical order, these entities include:

- U.S. Customs and Border Protection
- Defense Criminal Investigative Service
- United States Department of Commerce (DOC)
- U.S. International Trade Administration
- Federal Bureau of Investigation
- U.S. Food and Drug Administration's Office of Criminal Investigations
- U.S. General Services Administration's Office of Inspector General
- U.S. Immigration and Customs Enforcement
- INTERPOL
- Naval Criminal Investigative Service
- U.S. Patent and Trademark Office
- U.S. Postal Inspection Service
- U.S. Department of State's Office of International Intellectual Property Enforcement

Outside of America, pilot programs are in place where representatives of the Royal Canadian Mounted Police and the Government of Mexico Tax Administration Service serve in the center in order to coordinate U.S. enforcement efforts with that of Canada and Mexico.

== Purpose ==
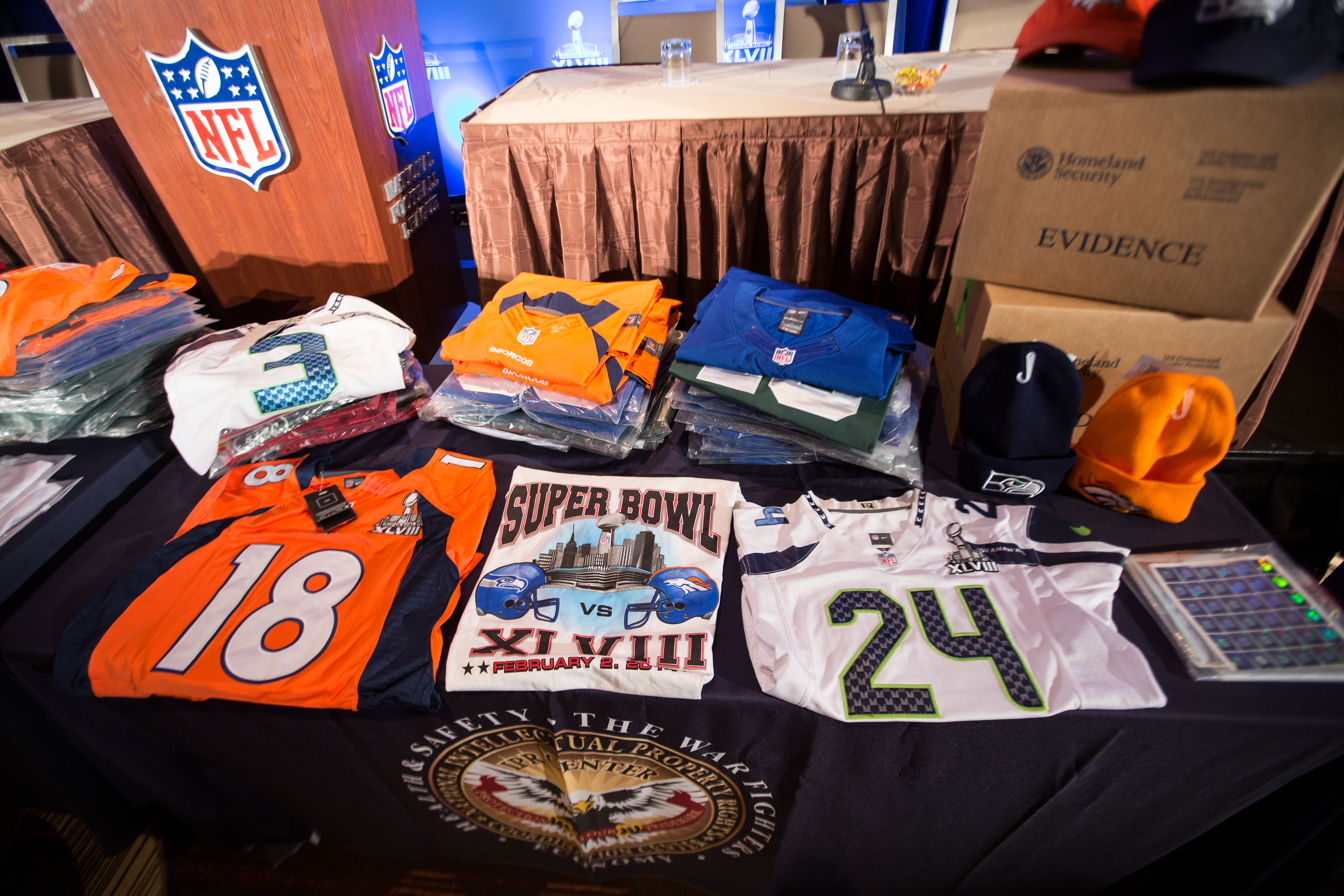
Counterfeit NFL merchandise on display at an NIPRCC press conference

The NIPRCC was created as a response to congressional criticism of federal enforcement efforts in the 1990s. Numerous Federal law enforcement agencies were and continue to share responsibility with investigating and prosecuting various intellectual property violations. The NIPRCC was created to promote information sharing, investigative and prosecutorial coordination, to provide a centralized reporting location and information resource for private businesses and the public, and to avoid duplicative efforts. For example, law enforcement agencies at the center share information gathered from their investigations. Emerging criminal trends and new infringing technologies are identified more quickly, and the information shared with the enforcing field officials.

The center address intellectual property crimes ranging from counterfeit pharmaceuticals, to illegally copied movies, TV, and music, to counterfeit machinery and other merchandise procured by the federal government, to counterfeit federal uniforms, badges, and other insignia, to consumer goods, to postal fraud.

The NIPRCC also works with the Office of the United States Trade Representative to identify trade barriers to U.S. companies and products due to the intellectual property laws, such as copyright, patents and trademarks, in other countries. This is reported annually in a Special 301 Report, named after Section 301, as amended of the Trade Act of 1974, that mandates it.

The NIPRCC was featured heavily in the U.S. Government's 2010 Joint Strategic Plan on Intellectual Property Enforcement and highlighted by a 2011 60 Minutes broadcast on counterfeit pharmaceuticals.

== Operation In Our Sites ==
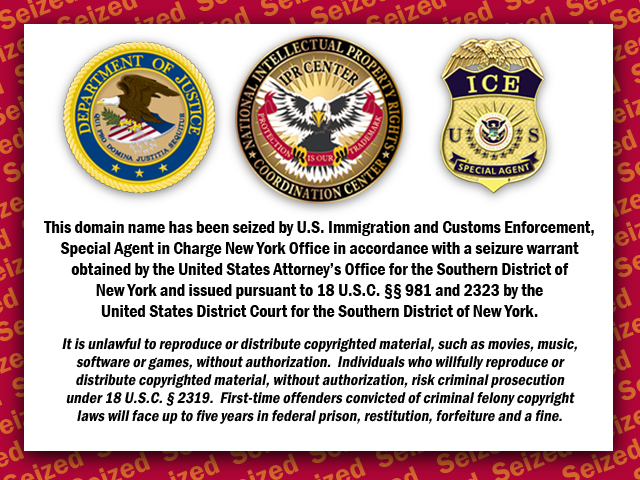
Notice displayed on a seized website

Operation "In Our Sites" is an initiative led by the NIPRCC to detect and hinder intellectual property violations on the Internet. The Operation is the culmination of investigations of websites that are suspected of hosting the illegal downloading of copyrighted media, the sale of counterfeit goods, and products that threaten public safety, such as counterfeit pharmaceuticals. In an undercover capacity, NIPRCC investigators download or acquire suspected counterfeit merchandise from the websites and their affiliates, to identify those websites that were involved in the distribution of stolen content or counterfeit goods. The Center shares this information with ICE's Homeland Security Investigations, which obtains a seizure warrant from a federal magistrate judge to seize the website domain name until the case can be adjudicated.

In the past years, these domains have included: tvshack.net, tvshack.cc, movies-links.tv, filespump.com, now-movies.com, planetmoviez.com, thepiratecity.org, zml.com, ninjavideo.net, ninjathis.net and strikegently.com. Visitors to these websites are greeted with a graphic bearing the seals of the Department of Justice, the NIPRCC and Immigration and Customs Enforcement. The graphic also includes the following text:

This domain name has been seized by U.S. Immigration and Customs Enforcement, Special Agent in Charge New York Office in accordance with a seizure warrant obtained by the United States Attorney's Office for the Southern District of New York. It is unlawful to reproduce or distribute copyrighted material, such as movies, music, software or games, without authorization. Individuals who willfully reproduce or distribute copyrighted material without authorization, risk criminal prosecution under 18 U.S.C § 2319. First-time offenders convicted of criminal felony copyright laws will face up to five years in federal prison, restitution, forfeiture and a fine.

== See also ==
- Special 301 Report
- U.S. Immigration and Customs Enforcement
- U.S. Office of the Trade Representative
