= Notorious market =

US term for websites hosting piracy

A notorious market is a website or physical market where, according to the Office of the United States Trade Representative (USTR), large-scale intellectual property infringement takes place. Officially termed Notorious Markets for Counterfeiting and Piracy, the USTR has generated a yearly list of such notorious markets since 2006 with input from various industry groups.

== History ==
Since 2006, the members of the International Intellectual Property Alliance in conjunction with the Office of the United States Trade Representative has annually filed a list of Notorious Markets as a part of their Special 301 Report to the U.S. federal government. It lists virtual markets (websites) and physical markets outside of the US where large scale copyright infringement takes place and recommends trade sanctions for countries with weak copyright protection enforcement. Since 2010 the list is separately issued as a part of an out-of-cycle review between the main report submissions.

Whilst the list of markets does not directly form national trade policy, the report says "The United States encourages the responsible authorities to step up efforts to combat piracy and counterfeiting in these and similar markets."

In January 2025, USTR annual report on notorious markets again listed the People's Republic of China (PRC) as "the number one source of counterfeit products in the world," with 90 percent of U.S. Customs and Border Protection seizures of counterfeit or pirated products coming from the PRC or Hong Kong.

== List creation process ==
The notorious market list is created following input from the Recording Industry Association of America (RIAA) and Motion Picture Association (MPAA), as well as other industry groups. The goal of the list is to encourage governments to take action against intellectual property violations, as well as encouraging markets to reform. Sites include torrenting websites such as The Pirate Bay, stream ripping sites, and sites for cheating in online games.

== Reports ==
MPAA submission	RIAA submission	Report	Date published
		2006 Special 301 Report	2006
		2007 Special 301 Report	2007
		2008 Special 301 Report	2008
		2009 Special 301 Report	April 2009
		2010 Special 301 Report	April 2010
November 2010	November 2010	2010 Out-of-Cycle Review	February 2011
October 2011		2011 Out-of-Cycle Review	December 2011
September 2012	August 2012	2012 Out-of-Cycle Review	December 2012
October 2013	September 2013	2013 Out-of-Cycle Review	February 2014
October 2014	October 2014	2014 Out-of-Cycle Review	March 2015
		2015 Out-of-Cycle Review	December 2015
		2016 Out-of-Cycle Review	December 2016
		2017 Out-of-Cycle Review	January 2018
		2018 Out-of-Cycle Review	April 2019
		2019 Review of Notorious Markets	April 2020
		2020 Review of Notorious Markets	January 2021
		2021 Review of Notorious Markets	February 2022
		2022 Review of Notorious Markets	January 2023
		2023 Review of Notorious Markets	January 2024
		2024 Review of Notorious Markets	January 2025
		2025 Review of Notorious Markets	March 2026

== See also ==
- Special 301 Report
