= Digital Theft Deterrence and Copyright Damages Improvement Act of 1999 =

- Long title: To amend statutory damages provisions of title 17, United States Code.
- Enacted by: the 106th United States Congress
- Effective: December 9, 1999

Citations
- Public law: Pub. L. 106-160

Codification
- Acts amended: Copyright Act of 1976
- Titles amended: 17 (Copyrights)
- U.S.C. sections amended: 17 U.S.C. §§ 504(c)

Legislative history
- Introduced in the House as H.R. 3456 by Rep. Howard Coble (R-NC) on November 18, 1999; Committee consideration by House Judiciary Committee (Subcommittee on Courts and Intellectual Property); Passed the House on November 18, 1999 (unanimous consent); Passed the Senate on November 19, 1999 (unanimous consent); Signed into law by President Clinton on December 9, 1999

Major amendments
- None

The Digital Theft Deterrence and Copyright Damages Improvement Act of 1999 is a United States law that increased the possible civil penalties for copyright infringement.

It also attempted to clear an administrative hurdle that was preventing the United States Sentencing Commission from implementing the NET Act of 1997's increased criminal penalties for similar offenses.

== Details ==
The range of allowable statutory damages in civil actions for copyright infringement was established by a previous act as a minimum of $500 per work, and a maximum of either $20,000 or $100,000 per work, depending on whether the infringement was "willful." The new legislation increased these amounts by 50%, changing the minimum to $750, and the maximums to $30,000 and $150,000.

== Rationale ==
When introducing an earlier version of the bill in the House of Representatives, Rep. Howard Coble (R-NC) stated that widespread use of the Internet and the advent of high-capacity storage media like the DVD had the potential to worsen the problem of disregard for copyright, so increased penalties were needed to more strongly deter infringement.

By the turn of the century the Internet is projected to have more than 200 million users, and the development of new technology will create additional incentive for copyright thieves to steal protected works. [...] Many computer users are either ignorant that copyright laws apply to Internet activity, or they simply believe that they will not be caught or prosecuted for their conduct. Also, many infringers do not consider the current copyright infringement penalties a real threat and continue infringing, even after a copyright owner puts them on notice that their actions constitute infringement and that they should stop the activity or face legal action.

This rationale was cited in the Sony BMG v. Tenenbaum case, which, among other things, unsuccessfully sought to challenge the fairness of the statutory damage range.

When introducing a new version of the bill in the House, Rep. Coble stated that it "provides an inflation adjustment" in order "to provide meaningful disincentives for infringement, and to accomplish that, the cost of infringement must substantially exceed the cost of the compliance so that those who use or distribute intellectual property have incentive to comply with the law."

After the bill passed the Senate, Sen. Patrick Leahy (D-VT) said that the increase would help deter digital copyright infringement, especially software piracy.
