= Special 301 Report =

Annual US report on trade barriers

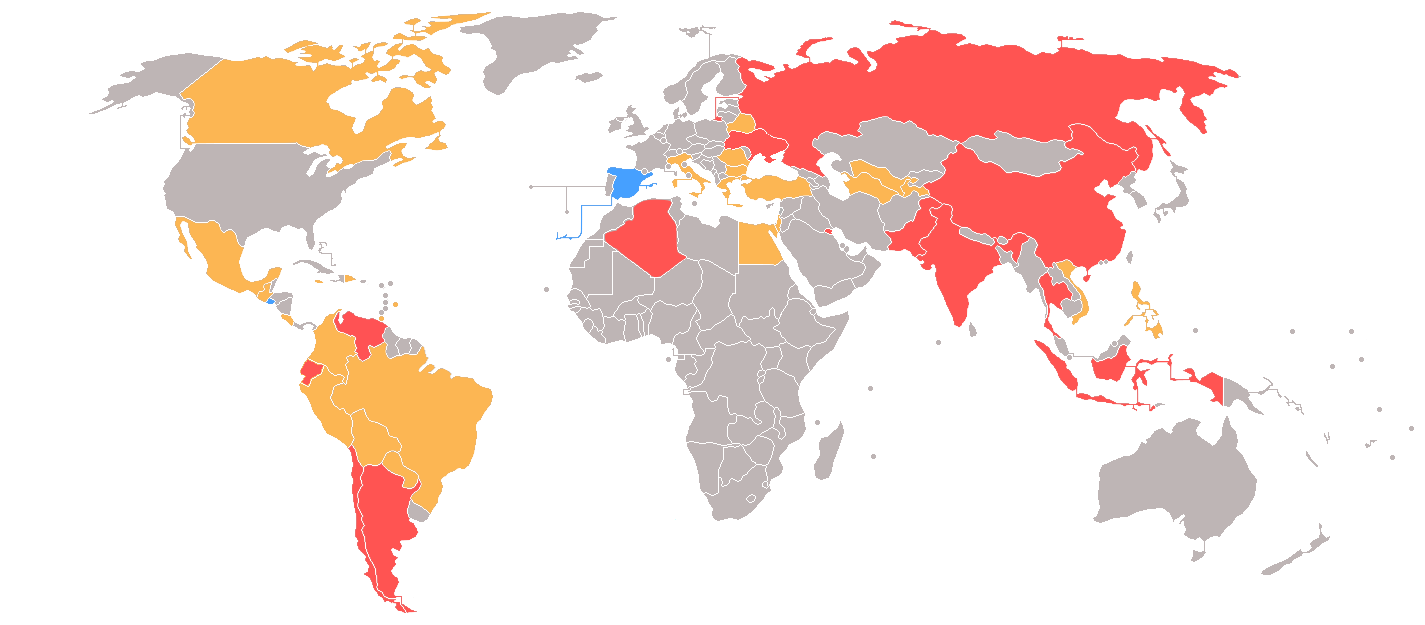
Special 301 Report 2013 Priority Foreign Country Priority Watch List Watch List Section 306 Monitoring Status Pending

The Special 301 Report is prepared annually by the Office of the United States Trade Representative (USTR) that identifies trade barriers to United States companies and products due to the intellectual property laws, such as copyright, patents and trademarks, in other countries. By April 30 of each year, the USTR must identify countries which do not provide "adequate and effective" protection of intellectual property rights or "fair and equitable market access to United States persons that rely upon intellectual property rights".

The Special 301 Report is published pursuant to Section 301 of the Trade Act of 1974 (19 U.S.C. § 2411) as amended by Section 1303 of the Omnibus Trade and Competitiveness Act of 1988. The Special 301 Report was first published in 1989.

By statute, the annual Special 301 Report includes a list of "Priority Foreign Countries", that are judged to have inadequate intellectual property laws; these countries may be subject to sanctions. In addition, the report contains a "Priority Watch List" and a "Watch List", containing countries whose intellectual property regimes are deemed of concern.

== Preparation ==
=== Special 301 Sub-Committee ===
The Special 301 Sub-Committee of the Trade Policy Staff Committee (TPSC) advises the United States Trade Representative on which countries to designate as "priority foreign countries" or to include in the watchlists. The Special 301 Sub-Committee is chaired by the Office of the United States Trade Representative (USTR) and its members include the Department of Commerce, the Patent and Trademark Office, the Department of State, the Department of Health and Human Services, the Department of Agriculture, the Copyright Office, the Council of Economic Advisers, and other agencies. U.S. companies provide extensive comments in the annual National Trade Estimate Report. The Special 301 Sub-Committee also takes the views of foreign governments and the views of U.S. embassies on intellectual property rights.

=== Complaints by U.S. companies ===
U.S. companies and intellectual property owners, including copyrights, patents and trademarks, can submit complaints (i.e., a petition alleging that a country has violated an international agreement with the United States that adversely affects the company or industry) to the Trade Compliance Centre, which provides a template for such complaints, or the country or industry desk at the International Trade Administration (ITA) of the U.S. Department of Commerce. The ITA then reviews trade-related complaints with co-operation from the Office of General Counsel and the U.S. Patent and Trademark Office. The complaint cannot be in relation to disputes between companies on intellectual property rights, but must be about instances where a country has violated an international agreement with the United States. Complaints can be made in relation to the intellectual property law of the country, judicial or administrative procedures that discriminate against the US company, and failure to enforce intellectual property laws, particularly in relation to trade in counterfeit goods, and lately online copyright infringement. Complaints do not need to reference specific international agreements or provisions that are being breached. Complaints will focus on a country's failure to protect the intellectual property rights of a US company or lack of intellectual property rights relates market access. Complaints are expected to include a description of the efforts the company has made to enforce its intellectual property rights in that country and provide estimates of economic losses resulting from the infringement of intellectual property rights in that country.

Most countries included in the Priority Watch List and Watch List between 1996 and 2000 were requested by Pharmaceutical Research and Manufacturers of America (PhRMA) or the International Intellectual Property Alliance (IIPA). According to Andres Guadamuz of the University of Edinburgh, the IIPA, which represents the U.S. media industry, urged the U.S. government to consider countries like Indonesia, Brazil, and India for inclusion in the Special 301 Watchlist in early 2010 because they either mandated or suggested the use of open-source software.

=== NGO submissions ===
In 2010, NGOs such as PhRMA, Oxfam, and MSF made submissions to the USTR.

== Designations ==
=== Priority Foreign Country ===
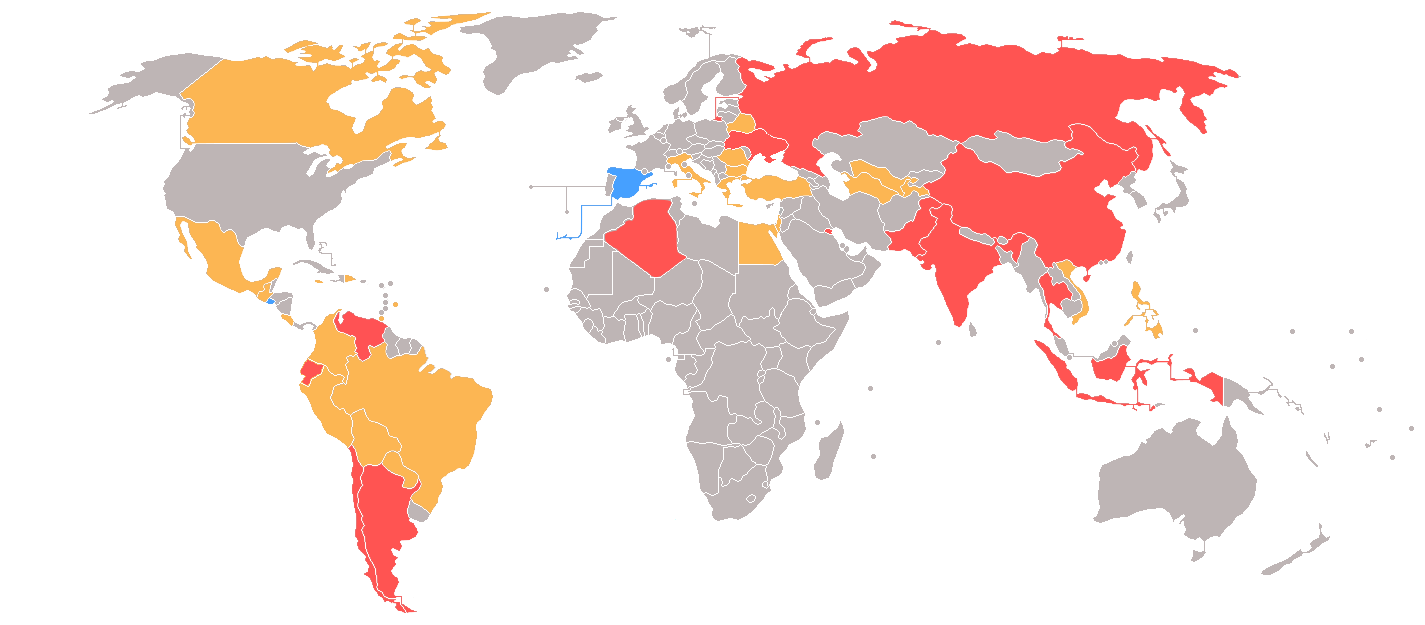
Special 301 Report 2013 Priority Foreign Country Priority Watch List Watch List Section 306 Monitoring Status Pending

A Priority Foreign Country is the worst classification given to "foreign countries that deny "adequate and effective" protection of intellectual property rights (IPR) or "fair and equitable market access" to U.S. persons relying upon IPR protection" under the Trade Act.

On 13 March 2001, the United States Trade Representative designated Ukraine as a Priority Foreign Country citing the massive amounts of unlicensed CDs sold in Europe that originate in Ukraine. In 2011 and 2012, no countries were classified as a Priority Foreign Country; however, Paraguay was made subject to Section 306 Monitoring. In 2013, Ukraine was redesignated as a Priority Foreign Country. In 2014, the US was in talks with the WTO to designate India as a "Priority Foreign Country" especially for the pharmaceutical sector.

Under the amended Section 301 of the Trade Act of 1974 the USTR must by April 30 of each year:

"identify (1) those foreign countries that (A) deny adequate and effective protection of intellectual property rights, or (B) deny fair and equitable markets access to United States persons that rely upon intellectual property protection, and (2) those foreign countries identified under paragraph (1) that are determined by the Trade Representative to be priority foreign countries".

The Act defines "priority foreign countries" as:

"those foreign countries - (A) that have the most onerous or egregious acts, policies, or practices that (i) deny adequate and effective intellectual property rights, or (ii) deny fair and equitable market access to United States persons that rely upon intellectual property protection, (B) whose acts, policies, or practices described in subparagraph (A) have the greatest adverse impact (actual or potential) on the relevant United States products, and (C) that are not (i) entering into good faith negotiations, or (ii) making significant progress in bilateral or multilateral negotiations to provide adequate and effective protection of intellectual property rights".

The Uruguay Round Agreement Act furthermore states that countries may be identified under Special 301 "taking into account the history of intellectual property laws and practices of the foreign country, including any previous identifications" and "the history of efforts of the United States, and the response of the foreign country, to achieve adequate and effective protection and enforcement of intellectual property rights". It also states that compliance with the World Trade Organization's Agreement on Trade-Related Aspects of Intellectual Property Rights (TRIPS) does not preclude a country from being identified as denying "adequate and effective protection of intellectual property rights".

The USTR acts on the information available at the time and can identify new "priority foreign countries" on an annual basis. The Special 301 Sub-Committee conducts additional reviews throughout the year for countries that "merit additional monitoring". The Trade Act of 1974 requires that the USTR to start investigations within 30 days of a country being identified as "priority foreign country", unless the USTR concludes that such an investigation "would be detrimental to United States economic interests". Unless the "priority foreign country" is regarded as being in breach of a trade agreement, including the Agreement on Trade-Related Aspects of Intellectual Property Rights (TRIPS), investigations must conclude within six months, with the possibility of a three-month extension. Reasons for extension include "substantial progress in drafting or implementing legislative or administrative measures that will provide adequate and effective protection of intellectual property rights" by the "priority foreign country". If the USTR believes that a trade agreement is being breached the USTR must conclude the investigation within 18 months, or within 30 days after the "dispute settlement procedure" has finished. If the USTR concludes that a trade agreement is being breached, "retaliation actions" may be taken under Section 301 of the Trade Act of 1974.

=== Priority Watch List and Watch List Countries ===
Two non-statutory categories have been created in addition to the statutory category of "priority foreign country", which once identified as such needs to be investigated and if found in breach with a trade agreement is subject to possible "retaliation actions" under Section 301 of the Trade Act of 1974. "Priority Watch List" and "Watch List" countries are identified by the annual Special 301 Report. "Priority Watchlist countries" are judged by the USTR as having "serious intellectual property rights deficiencies" that require increased USTR attention. "Watch List" countries have been identified by the USTR as having "serious intellectual property rights deficiencies" but are not yet placed on the "Priority Watchlist". The USTR can move countries from one list to the other, or remove them from the lists, throughout the year.

=== Historical designations ===
The International Intellectual Property Alliance keeps these statistics since 1989.

- PFC: Priority Foreign Country
- PWL: Priority Watch List
- WL: Watch list
- Monitoring: Section 306 Monitoring
- Pending: Status Pending
- *: Indicates a change in categorisation

Country	2005	2006	2007	2008	2009	2010	2011	2012	2013	2014	2015	2016	2017	2018	2026
Algeria				*WL	*PWL	PWL	PWL	PWL	PWL	PWL	PWL	PWL	PWL	PWL	WL
Argentina	PWL	PWL	PWL	PWL	PWL	PWL	PWL	PWL	PWL	PWL	PWL	PWL	PWL	PWL	WL
Azerbaijan	WL	*													
Bahamas	WL	WL	*												
Barbados									*WL	WL	WL	WL	WL	WL	WL
Belarus	WL	WL	WL	WL	WL	WL	WL	WL	WL	*	*WL	*			WL
Belize	WL	*PWL	*WL	*											
Bolivia	WL	WL	WL	WL	WL	WL	WL	WL	WL	WL	WL	WL	WL	WL	WL
Brazil	PWL	PWL	*WL	WL	WL	WL	WL	WL	WL	WL	WL	WL	WL	WL	WL
Brunei					*WL	WL	WL	WL	*						
Bulgaria	WL	WL	*						*WL	WL	WL	WL	WL		
Canada	WL	WL	WL	WL	*PWL	PWL	PWL	PWL	*WL	WL	WL	WL	WL	PWL	WL
Chile	WL	WL	*PWL	PWL	PWL	PWL	PWL	PWL	PWL	PWL	PWL	PWL	PWL	PWL	PWL
China		*PWL	PWL	PWL	PWL	PWL	PWL	PWL	PWL	PWL	PWL	PWL	PWL	PWL	PWL
Colombia	WL	WL	WL	WL	WL	WL	WL	WL	WL	WL	WL	WL	WL	PWL	WL
Costa Rica	WL	WL	WL	WL	WL	WL	WL	WL	WL	WL	WL	WL	WL	WL	
Croatia	WL	WL	*												
Czech Republic				*WL	WL	*									
Dominican Republic	WL	WL	WL	WL	WL	WL	WL	WL	WL	WL	WL	WL	WL	WL	
Ecuador	WL	WL	WL	WL	WL	WL	WL	WL	WL	WL	*PWL	*WL	WL	WL	WL
Egypt	PWL	PWL	PWL	*WL	WL	WL	WL	WL	WL	WL	WL	WL	WL	WL	WL
European Union	WL	WL	*												WL
Finland					*WL	WL	WL	WL	WL	WL	*				
Greece				*WL	WL	WL	WL	WL	WL	WL	WL	WL	WL	WL	WL
Guatemala	WL	WL	WL	WL	WL	WL	WL	WL	WL	WL	WL	WL	WL	WL	
Hungary	WL	WL	WL	WL	WL	*									
India	PWL	PWL	PWL	PWL	PWL	PWL	PWL	PWL	PWL	PWL	PWL	PWL	PWL	PWL	PWL
Indonesia	PWL	PWL	*WL	WL	*PWL	PWL	PWL	PWL	PWL	PWL	PWL	PWL	PWL	PWL	PWL
Israel	PWL	PWL	PWL	PWL	PWL	*Pending	*PWL	PWL	*WL	*					
Italy	WL	WL	WL	WL	WL	WL	WL	WL	WL	*					
Jamaica	WL	WL	WL	WL	WL	WL	WL	WL	WL	WL	WL	WL	WL	WL	
Kuwait	PWL	*WL	WL	WL	WL	WL	WL	WL	WL	WL	*PWL	PWL	PWL	PWL	
Kazakhstan	WL	*													
Latvia	WL	WL	*												
Lebanon	PWL	PWL	PWL	*WL	WL	WL	WL	WL	WL	WL	WL	WL	WL	WL	
Lithuania	WL	WL	WL	*											
Malaysia	WL	WL	WL	WL	WL	WL	WL	*							
Mexico	WL	WL	WL	WL	WL	WL	WL	WL	WL	WL	WL	WL	WL	WL	WL
Norway				WL	WL	WL	WL	WL	*						
Pakistan	PWL	*WL	WL	*PWL	PWL	PWL	PWL	PWL	PWL	PWL	PWL	*WL	WL	WL	WL
Paraguay	Monitoring	Monitoring	Monitoring	Monitoring	Monitoring	Monitoring	Monitoring	Monitoring	*WL	WL	WL	*			WL
Peru	WL	WL	WL	WL	WL	WL	WL	WL	WL	WL	WL	WL	WL	WL	WL
Philippines	PWL	*WL	WL	WL	WL	WL	WL	WL	WL	*					
Poland	WL	WL	WL	WL	WL	*									
Romania	WL	WL	WL	WL	WL	WL	WL	WL	WL	WL	WL	WL	WL	WL	
Russia	PWL	PWL	PWL	PWL	PWL	PWL	PWL	PWL	PWL	PWL	PWL	PWL	PWL	PWL	PWL
Saudi Arabia	WL	WL	WL	WL	WL	*								WL	
Slovakia	WL	*													
South Korea	WL	WL	WL	WL	*										
Spain				*WL	WL	WL	WL	*							
Switzerland												*WL	WL	WL	
Taiwan	WL	WL	WL	WL	*										
Tajikistan	WL	WL	WL	WL	WL	WL	WL	WL	WL	WL	WL	*		WL	
Thailand	WL	WL	*PWL	PWL	PWL	PWL	PWL	PWL	PWL	PWL	PWL	PWL	PWL	WL	WL
Trinidad and Tobago									*WL	WL	WL	*			WL
Turkey	PWL	PWL	PWL	*WL	WL	WL	WL	WL	WL	WL	WL	WL	WL	WL	WL
Turkmenistan	WL	WL	WL	WL	WL	WL	WL	WL	WL	WL	WL	WL	WL	WL	
Ukraine	PFC	*PWL	PWL	*WL	WL	WL	WL	*PWL	*PFC	PFC	*PWL	PWL	PWL	PWL	Suspended
United Arab Emirates														WL	
Uruguay	WL	*													
Uzbekistan	WL	WL	WL	WL	WL	WL	WL	WL	WL	WL	WL	WL	WL	WL	
Venezuela	PWL	PWL	PWL	PWL	PWL	PWL	PWL	PWL	PWL	PWL	PWL	PWL	PWL	PWL	PWL
Vietnam	WL	WL	WL	WL	WL	WL	WL	WL	WL	WL	WL	WL	WL	WL	PFC

== Consequences ==
In response to countries being included on the Special 301 Report Watchlists the U.S. government may initiate dispute settlement proceedings at the World Trade Organization (WTO) or other relevant trade agreement, including the North American Free Trade Agreement (NAFTA). The U.S. government can also eliminate tariff preferences unilaterally granted, such as the Generalized System of Preferences (GSP).

If an USTR investigation concludes that a country has violated a trade agreement Section 301 allows the U.S. government to impose unilateral trade sanctions if the country is not a member of the World Trade Organization (WTO) or any other trade agreement establishing dispute settlement provisions, such as free trade agreements, which are relevant to the alleged violation. Unilateral trade sanctions under section 301 were imposed on December 20, 2001, on Ukraine, which was not yet a WTO member, by imposing a prohibitive tariff on metals, footwear, and other imports because the USTR concluded that the country had failed to enact legislation to enforce copyright in relation to music CDs and their export. Section 301 was also invoked by President Trump in March 2018, setting off the 2018 China–United States trade dispute.

According to the International Intellectual Property Alliance (IIPA) the Special 301 Report and the Watchlists is used to pressure other nations to adopt stricter copyright laws and take a more active role in combating copyright infringement.

=== WTO dispute settlement proceedings ===
The USTR has used the Special 301 Reports to initiate formal dispute settlement proceedings at the World Trade Organization (WTO) if it believes a country does not comply with the Agreement on Trade-Related Aspects of Intellectual Property Rights (TRIPS). WTO dispute settlement proceedings are initiated when the country's noncompliance with TRIPS is judged to be too narrow to make the country a "priority foreign country". The countries against which the USTR intends to pursue dispute settlement proceedings are announced every April in the Special 301 Report.

== Criticism ==
=== Lobbying power ===
Peter Drahos, a law professor at the Centre for Commercial Law Studies at Queen Mary University of London's School of Law, has called the Special 301 Report "a public law devoted to the service of private corporate interests". It protects and acts in favor of U.S. intellectual property owners, most often large corporations, against any foreign national policy or unofficial action that does not conform to the United States' position on international copyright and IP. Threat of action under Special 301 has been used to insert U.S. trade lobby backed advisers into states' domestic legislative process in order to ensure compliance with U.S. trade norms. One of the most direct examples comes from a former U.S. trade lobbyist, speaking in 1993:

"Jamaica had no intellectual property law, but they wrote one (with our help). Similarly the Dominican Republic. I sat down with their lawyer and together we wrote their copyright law."

On the other hand, according to the Electronic Frontier Foundation (EFF), concerns about foreign IP policies that are overly restrictive, such as a lack of fair use in some countries, are not included in Special 301 reports.

=== Trade warring ===
Most countries included in the Priority Watch List and Watch List between 1996 and 2000 were requested by Pharmaceutical Research and Manufacturers of America or International Intellectual Property Alliance. For example, Finland was blacklisted in retaliation to unanimously adopted legislation requiring the tax-funded Social Insurance Institution to reimburse the cost of medications only up to the price of the cheapest generic. Intellectual property is not violated, as this affects all manufacturers equally; nevertheless, this retaliatory measure has had a negative impact on investment decisions unrelated to the pharmaceutical industry.

== See also ==
- Anti-Counterfeiting Trade Agreement (ACTA)
- Doha Development Round
- Generalized System of Preferences
- International Trade Administration
- Notorious markets
- United States International Trade Commission
- United States Commercial Service
- China–United States trade war
- South Korea–United States relations

== Bibliography ==
- Masterson, John T. (2004). International trademarks and copyright: enforcement and management. American Bar Association. ISBN 978-1-59031-359-6.
