= Business Software Association of Australia =

The Business Software Association of Australia (BSAA, founded in 1989) was an industry association in Australia of commercial software producers and corporations that advocated software copyright compliancy and assisted the litigation of copyright infringement through support and funding. The BSAA typically retained the law firm Mallesons Stephen Jacques (a particularly notable Australian law firm) to investigate and litigate its interests.

The association published a range of auditing tools and provided information on software copyright and license compliancy.

The association had been particularly more active in the defense of copyright infringement since January 2006 when Australian Copyright law was changed to make the running of an enterprise with infringing software a criminal offense.

As of January 2007, the BSAA is now the Australian branch of the Business Software Alliance.

== Members ==
The full members of the BSAA were Adobe Systems, Microsoft, Computer Associates, Symantec, Autodesk and Apple Computer.

== Criticisms ==
Like most industry associations that support litigation of copyright matters, the BSAA was occasionally mentioned as being draconian, although it is considerably more measured in action it takes than its counterparts in the UK and United States.

Associations such as the BSAA are also sometimes considered as an example of a 'good hand, bad hand' tactic as its members can actively pursue their interests through the association and draw criticism to the association rather than themselves as members.
