= Sony BMG Music Entertainment v. Tenenbaum =

American legal case involving music filesharing

Sony BMG v. Tenenbaum
- Court: First Circuit Court of Appeals
- Full case name: Sony BMG Music Entertainment et al. v. Tenenbaum

In the 2003 case of Sony BMG Music Entertainment et al. v. Tenenbaum, record label Sony BMG, along with Warner Bros. Records, Atlantic Records, Arista Records, and UMG Recordings, accused Joel Tenenbaum of illegally downloading and sharing files in violation of U.S. copyright law. It was only the second file-sharing case (after Capitol v. Thomas) to go to verdict in the Recording Industry Association of America's (RIAA) anti-downloading litigation campaign. (The vast majority of cases having been settled out of court.) After the judge entered a finding of liability, a jury assessed damages of $675,000, which the judge reduced to $67,500 on constitutional grounds, rather than through remittitur.

After both parties appealed, the First Circuit Court of Appeals reinstated the original damage award of $675,000 and remanded the case to the District Court, ruling that the judge should have avoided the constitutional issue by first considering remittitur. The Supreme Court refused to hear Tenenbaum's appeal arguing against the remand. A new District Court judge then found no cause for remittitur, and held that the statutory damage award was constitutional. Tenenbaum again appealed to the First Circuit, which in June 2013 upheld the award.

== Background ==
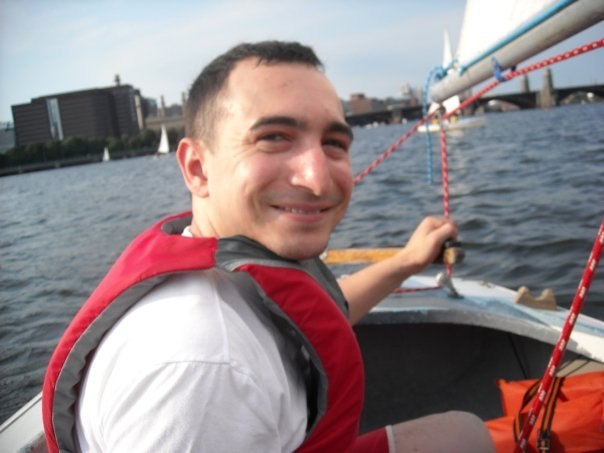

Joel Tenenbaum's issues started as a college student at Boston University when he was accused of spreading songs to millions of people by uploading them onto P2P networks like Napster and Limewire.

The record companies alleged they had given him warnings of these crimes prior to the trial and told him to stop what he was doing right away. They claim he had given a wide array of excuses as to why he was still distributing these songs.

Tenenbaum was not the only one who had been given a lawsuit as, after September 8, 2003, there were thousands of similar lawsuits being filed. Over 5 years the number of cases surpassed 35,000 and caused the court to apply the Copyright act to the digital realm.

== Court case ==
=== Pre-trial ===
In 2003, a demand for $3,500 was received at Tenenbaum's parents' house for songs that the then 20-year-old allegedly downloaded. Tenenbaum explained his financial situation as a student and offered a partial payment of $500, which was ultimately rejected.

After several other correspondences, the five record labels later filed suit against Tenenbaum in August 2007, accusing him of copyright infringement for the sharing of thirty-one music files via Kazaa, and demanding statutory damages. Tenenbaum then offered the plaintiffs the original complaint amount of $5250, but the music companies declined, and subsequently demanded "double."

=== Trial ===
The case went to trial in the last week of July 2009.

Nesson argued that Tenenbaum's situation was similar to the Napster situation in 1999 and that he did not intend any harm nor understood the copyright laws. The plaintiffs claimed Tenenbaum repeatedly infringed copyright laws and that he had taken actions to evade the law.

During the trial, Tenenbaum answered "yes" to the plaintiff's counsel's question "Mr. Tenenbaum, on the stand now are you now admitting liability for downloading and distributing all 30 sound recordings that are at issue and listed on Exhibits 55 and 56 of the exhibits?" The next day, Judge Nancy Gertner issued a directed verdict, instructing the jury that liability was no longer at issue; they only needed to determine an appropriate amount for damages, which would be partly based on whether they believed the infringement was "willful."

On July 31, 2009, the jury awarded $675,000 to the music companies, taking a middle option between the statutory minimum ($22,500 total) and maximum ($4.5 million) for willful infringement. Nesson had planned to appeal; if the verdict had stood, Tenenbaum had planned to file for bankruptcy.

=== Post-trial ===
On July 9, 2010, Judge Gertner reduced Tenenbaum's fines to $67,500, holding that arbitrarily high statutory damages violate due process and are thus unconstitutional,

far greater than necessary to serve the government's legitimate interests in compensating copyright owners and deterring infringement. In fact, it bears no meaningful relationship to these objectives. To borrow Chief Judge Michael J. Davis' characterization of a smaller statutory damages award in an analogous file-sharing case, the award here is simply 'unprecedented and oppressive.'

On July 21, 2010, both parties filed notice to appeal the ruling.

=== Appeal ===
Oral arguments in the appeal were held in the First Circuit on April 4, 2011 as 660 F.3d 487 (1st Cir. 2011).

The appeal broached several topics, one of which was the District Court's authority to reduce a statutory damage award on constitutional grounds. Two Supreme Court cases were cited: BMW of North America, Inc. v. Gore and St. Louis, I.M. & S. Ry. Co. v. Williams. Tenenbaum argued for the application of the Gore standard, which regards punitive damage awards as eligible for reduction, and allows actual damages to be taken into consideration. The record companies and the U.S. Government countered that statutory damages and punitive damages are different things, so the Williams standard, which is less stringent than Gore, should apply.

On September 16, 2011, the First Circuit rejected all of Tenenbaum's arguments, and, avoiding the question of which standard to apply, held that the District Court had erred by ruling on the constitutionality of the jury award before considering whether the award should be reduced by common law remittitur. It vacated the reduction in damages, reinstated the original $675,000 award, and remanded to the District Court for reconsideration of the remittitur question by another judge, since Gertner retired. Gertner's retirement followed her appointment at Harvard Law, where she is now a colleague of Professor Nesson.

On 31 October 2011, attorneys for Tenenbaum filed a petition for a rehearing in the First Circuit Court of Appeals because "it is unconstitutional to instruct a jury that it can return an unconstitutionally excessive award. To instruct the jury that it may ascribe an award in a range of up to $4,500,000 against a noncommercial copyright infringer is punitive, excessive, not authorized by statute, and a denial of due process." On November 17, 2011, the Court denied the request to rehear the case.

Tenenbaum's lawyer then asked the Supreme Court to hear the case, arguing that the Appeals Court should not have sent the case back to District Court, because the plaintiffs would likely reject an award reduced by remittitur and would opt for a retrial, pushing Tenenbaum "down an endless litigation rathole" on a "retrial merry-go-round." The Supreme Court declined to hear the case, leaving no option but for the District Court to decide whether to reduce the award via remittitur.

=== Post-appeal ===
On February 13, 2012, Tenenbaum petitioned the United States Supreme Court to review the case. The court denied the petition on May 21. In early 2012, the parties submitted briefs and responses to the District Court regarding the remittitur and due process issues. The plaintiffs asked the court to strike or disregard Tenenbaum's reply briefs, which, in violation of procedure, contained facts and arguments that were not in his opening brief.

On June 5, 2012, Tenenbaum requested a new trial to determine a new damage award. Although Judge Gertner and the Court of Appeals had both already rejected this argument when it was made on constitutional grounds, Tenenbaum reasoned that if the District Court feels that the jury award was unjust, this time for any reason, then the statutory range given in the instructions to the original jury was unjust, and the instructions were therefore faulty and a new damages-amount trial is warranted. The record companies asked the court to strike or reject Tenenbaum's request, maintaining that the award was not excessive, and arguing that the trial request had no legal basis and was untimely since it contravened the Appeals Court's remand for consideration of remittitur.

On August 23, 2012, Judge Rya W. Zobel, Judge Gertner's successor, rejected Tenenbaum's request for a new trial as untimely, and disregarded the facts and arguments improperly raised in Tenenbaum's reply briefs.

In the same order, Judge Zobel acted on the remand, holding that reduction of the award via remittitur wasn't warranted, since the jury had ample reason to find that Tenenbaum willfully infringed. A footnote in the First Circuit's remand stated that in this situation, the District Court and the parties to the case "will have to address the relationship between the remittitur standard and the due process standard for statutory damage awards." Judge Zobel ruled in favor of the plaintiffs, noting that Gore had never been applied to statutory damages; reasoning that two of the three "guideposts" in Gore couldn't logically apply to statutory damages; and citing many examples of case law that support applying Williams. The court also cited the legislative history of the Digital Theft Deterrence and Copyright Damages Improvement Act of 1999, which raised the statutory damage limits for several reasons, one of which was to be a more effective deterrent in response to widespread copyright infringement on the Internet.

Given the deference afforded Congress' statutory award determination and the public harms it was designed to address, the particular behavior of plaintiff in this case [...] and the fact that the award not only is within the range for willful infringement but also below the limit for non-willful infringement, the award is neither "wholly disproportioned to the offense" nor "obviously unreasonable." It does not offend due process.

— Hon. Rya W. Zobel, D. Mass

Accordingly, the District Court held that $675,000 award, as previously reinstated by the First Circuit Court of Appeals, stands.

Tenenbaum submitted notice of appeal to the First Circuit on September 17, 2012. In June 2013, the First Circuit upheld the statutory damages award:

The evidence of Tenenbaum's copyright infringement easily justifies the conclusion that his conduct was egregious. Tenenbaum carried on his activities for years in spite of numerous warnings, he made thousands of songs available illegally, and he denied responsibility during discovery. Much of this behavior was exactly what Congress was trying to deter when it amended the Copyright Act. Therefore, we do not hesitate to conclude that an award of $22,500 per song, an amount representing 15% of the maximum award for willful violations and less than the maximum award for non-willful violations, comports with due process.

Tenenbaum subsequently filed for Chapter 7 bankruptcy in November 2015 and the court granted a discharge of the $675,000 judgement against him in March 2016.

== Songs at issue and implications ==
The initial lawsuit included the following 31 songs. However, the Smashing Pumpkins song was removed from the list prior to the trial, so only 30 songs were at issue.

Copyright Owner	Artist	Recording Title	Album title
Sony BMG Music Entertainment	Incubus	New Skin	Science
Warner Bros. Records	Green Day	Minority	Warning
Arista Records	Outkast	Wheelz of Steel	Atliens
Sony BMG Music Entertainment	Incubus	Pardon Me	Make Yourself
UMG Recordings	Nirvana	Come As You Are	Nevermind
Warner Bros. Records	Green Day	When I Come Around	Dookie
Warner Bros. Records	Green Day	Nice Guys Finish Last	Nimrod
UMG Recordings	Nirvana	Heart-Shaped Box	In Utero
UMG Recordings	Nine Inch Nails	The Perfect Drug	The Perfect Drug (EP)
UMG Recordings	Blink-182	Adam's Song	Enema of the State
UMG Recordings	Limp Bizkit	Rearranged	Significant Other
UMG Recordings	Limp Bizkit	Leech	Three Dollar Bill, Y'all$
Warner Bros. Records	Linkin Park	Crawling	Hybrid Theory
Warner Bros. Records	Deftones	Be Quiet and Drive	Around the Fur
Sony BMG Music Entertainment	The Fugees	Killing Me Softly	The Score
Warner Bros. Records	Red Hot Chili Peppers	Californication	Californication
Warner Bros. Records	Red Hot Chili Peppers	By the Way	By the Way
Warner Bros. Records	Red Hot Chili Peppers	My Friends	One Hot Minute
UMG Recordings	Beck	Loser	Mellow Gold
Virgin Records America	Smashing Pumpkins	Bullet with Butterfly Wings	Mellon Collie and the Infinite Sadness
Interscope Records	Eminem	My Name Is	The Slim Shady
Interscope Records	Eminem	Drug Ballad	The Marshall Mathers (EP)
Interscope Records	Eminem	Cleaning Out My Closet	Eminem Show
UMG Recordings	Beastie Boys	(You Gotta) Fight for Your Right (To Party)	Licensed to Ill
Warner Bros. Records	The Ramones	The KKK Took My Baby Away	Pleasant Dreams
UMG Recordings	Monster Magnet	Look To Your Orb for the Warning	Dopes to Infinity
Sony BMG Music Entertainment	Aerosmith	Pink	Nine Lives
Arista Records	Outkast	Rosa Parks	Aquemini
Sony BMG Music Entertainment	Rage Against the Machine	Guerrilla Radio	The Battle of Los Angeles
Warner Bros. Records	Goo Goo Dolls	Iris	Dizzy Up the Girl
UMG Recordings	Aerosmith	Water Song/Janie's Got a Gun	Pump

== See also ==
- Trade group efforts against file sharing
- Capitol Records, Inc. v. Thomas-Rasset
- The Pirate Bay
