= International Intellectual Property Alliance =

Trade group coalition

- Abbreviation: IIPA
- Formation: 1984
- Type: Private sector coalition
- Fields: Copyright
- Affiliations: Association of American Publishers; Entertainment Software Association; Independent Film & Television Alliance; Motion Picture Association; Recording Industry Association of America
- Website: iipa.org

The International Intellectual Property Alliance (IIPA) is a coalition of five trade associations representing American companies that produce copyright-protected material, including computer software, films, television programs, music, books, and journals (electronic and print media). Formed in 1984, it seeks to strengthen international copyright protection and enforcement by working with the U.S. government, foreign governments, and private-sector representatives.

== Activities ==
IIPA works closely with the U.S. Trade Representative in compiling the annual Special 301 reviews of foreign countries that the Office of the U.S. Trade Representative considers to have inadequate protection of intellectual property rights. IIPA was the principal representative of the entertainment industry in assisting the U.S. government in the World Trade Organization (WTO) TRIPS negotiations, the North American Free Trade Agreement (NAFTA) negotiations, and at the Diplomatic Conference leading to the completion in 1996 of the World Intellectual Property Organization (WIPO) "Internet" treaties—i.e., the Copyright Treaty and the Performances and Phonograms Treaty.

IIPA has also worked with the U.S. government in drafting Intellectual Property Rights Chapters of free trade agreements. It participates in policy development in copyright and enforcement issues in bilateral and regional initiatives such as the Asia Pacific Economic Cooperation (APEC). IIPA participates in trade actions brought under trade laws like the Generalized System of Preferences and other trade preference programs.

== Member associations ==
The five trade associations that make up the IIPA membership include:

- Association of American Publishers (AAP)
- Entertainment Software Association (ESA)
- Independent Film & Television Alliance (IFTA)
- Motion Picture Association (MPA)
- Recording Industry Association of America (RIAA)

== See also ==
- Intellectual property organization
- Special 301 Report
- Notorious markets
