= Capitol Records, Inc. v. Thomas-Rasset =

Lawsuit in the United States

Capitol Records, Inc. v. Thomas-Rasset was the first file-sharing copyright infringement lawsuit in the United States brought by major record labels to be tried before a jury. The defendant, Jammie Thomas-Rasset, was found liable to the plaintiff record company for making 24 songs available to the public for free on the Kazaa file sharing service and ordered to pay $220,000.

Before filing suit, Capitol Records offered to settle for $5,000, but Thomas-Rasset declined. The ultimate damage order came after several trials and appeals in 2007–2013. The damage award at one stage reached $1,920,000.

The case was originally named Virgin Records America, Inc v. Thomas-Rasset.

== Background ==
Jammie Thomas (born 1977), now Jammie Thomas-Rasset, is a Native American mother of four from Brainerd, Minnesota, and worked as a natural resources coordinator for the Mille Lacs Band of Ojibwe Indians.

The RIAA sent Thomas a cease-and-desist letter and settlement offer in August 2005. Thomas declined the settlement offer. On April 19, 2006, several major record labels sued Thomas for copyright infringement by unauthorized downloading and sharing of 24 sound recordings on Kazaa under the username "TEREASTARR@KaZaA". The labels' complaint alleged that Thomas infringed copyright on February 21, 2005, downloading and distributing songs by such bands as Aerosmith, Green Day, and Guns N' Roses. Rather than seeking actual damages, the plaintiffs sought relief via statutory damages, assessed in accordance with 17 USC 92 § 504(c)(2).

== Litigation ==
=== First trial ===
The first trial against Thomas was held in Duluth, Minnesota and was presided over by U.S. District Court Judge Michael J. Davis. Thomas was represented by Minneapolis attorney Brian Toder. The plaintiffs alleged that on February 21, 2005, Jammie Thomas shared a total of 1,702 tracks online; however, plaintiffs sought relief for only 24 of these.

Thomas contended that she was not the person behind the "tereastarr" account and denied having downloaded any files. During the trial, her lawyer suggested her computer could have been under the control of people elsewhere by means of "a spoof, a zombie or some other type of hack". Juror Michael Hegg later commented, "She's a liar." A hard drive containing the copyrighted songs was never presented at the trial, though Thomas did turn over a hard drive that referenced neither Kazaa nor the infringing files to the plaintiffs' attorneys.

The jury was instructed that merely "making available" sufficed to constitute an infringement of the plaintiffs' distribution right, even without proof of any actual distribution. The issue of whether copyright infringement required actual distribution was raised by the defense during examination of Sony BMG's head of litigation on the first day of trial, but the court sustained the plaintiffs' objection and did not permit the topic to be revisited until jury instructions were prepared just before the trial's conclusion. Despite disagreement from the defense, the court proceeded to interpret "making available" as distribution for purposes of instructing the jury.

On October 4, 2007, after 5 minutes of deliberation, the jury returned a verdict finding her liable for willful infringement, and awarded statutory damages in the amount of $9,250 for each of the 24 songs for a total of $222,000.

=== Retrial ===
The judge in Thomas' trial then, sua sponte (of his own accord), issued an order indicating a possible "manifest error of law" in connection with his "making available" jury instruction, on the ground that it may have contravened binding 8th Circuit precedent, and on the ground that a case upon which the RIAA and the Court had relied had been vacated by the Court which had issued it, without Judge Davis's knowledge. Subsequently, the Court vacated the judgment, on the ground that "making available" could not be equated with "distribution" under "settled case law".

The retrial which ensued found Thomas-Rasset liable for willful copyright infringement, and awarded plaintiffs damages of $1.92 million.

==== Highlights ====
In May 2009, during preparation for the retrial, Brian Toder stepped down as Thomas-Rasset's lawyer. Thomas-Rasset then accepted Joe Sibley and Kiwi Camara's offer to defend her pro bono.

Before the trial, Camara unsuccessfully tried to persuade the court to bar evidence collected by MediaSentry, arguing that the company was not a licensed private investigator under the Minnesota Private Detectives Act (MPDA) and that it violated federal pen register and wiretapping laws. In rejecting these arguments, the court said that the MPDA did not apply to an out-of-state entity like MediaSentry, and that "There is no expectation of solitude or seclusion when a person activates a file sharing program and sends a file to the requesting computer. By participating in Kazaa, a user expects millions of other users to view and copy her files, each time receiving the very information that Thomas-Rasset sent to MediaSentry and MediaSentry recorded."

Camara also tried to raise a fair use defense at the last minute, but it was disallowed on procedural grounds. Fair use is an affirmative defense which would have to have been raised prior to the first trial, or at least reasonably early enough to allow for discovery in the retrial, whereas the retrial date was only days away.

The retrial was held on June 15, 2009, under the updated case name Capitol Records v. Thomas-Rasset.

During oral arguments, the parties disagreed on whether Thomas-Rasset received notice of investigation, and whether she got the hard drive replaced to destroy evidence or because it was damaged in an unrelated incident.

The arguments presented by the plaintiffs included technical details tying the shared folder on Kazaa to her IP address, the user name in the shared folder matching the user name on many of the defendant's online accounts, and the fact that numerous files in the shared folder contained tags giving credit to uploaders and ripping groups—indicating they were likely downloaded, not ripped from her own CDs. Although only 24 songs were at issue, plaintiffs told the jury that 1,700-plus songs were in the shared folder, that "a message must be sent", and that the infringement was "substantial" and "massive". At one point, the plaintiffs drew a rebuke from the court for presenting new evidence of questionable relevance; it was partially stricken from the record.

The defense argued that Thomas-Rasset had no reason to download music, as she was one of the plaintiffs' best customers, having legally purchased over 200 CDs, including many of the songs at issue, which she only ever ripped into WMA format, not MP3 as found in the shared folder. On the stand, Thomas-Rasset speculated that perhaps her children or then-boyfriend had installed Kazaa on her computer without her knowledge. Closing arguments focused on the fact that none of the evidence pointed to Thomas-Rasset personally, but only to the IP address assigned to her Internet account.

The jury was instructed to find that the owners' copyrights were infringed if the plaintiffs owned copyrights in the songs and there was an infringement of either the reproduction right (via Thomas-Rasset "downloading copyrighted sound recordings on a peer-to-peer network, without license from the copyright owners") or the distribution right (via Thomas-Rasset "distributing copyrighted sound recordings to other users on a peer-to-peer network, without license from the copyright owners"). For each song reproduced or distributed, the infringement had to be assessed as willful or non-willful, and damages assessed accordingly. The jury was not allowed to be specific in its verdict about which rights (distribution or reproduction) were infringed, and the judge did not attempt to define distribution in the second trial.

After 5 hours of deliberation on June 18, the jury found Thomas-Rasset liable for willful copyright infringement of all the songs in question, and awarded the plaintiffs statutory damages of $1.92 million ($80,000 per song, within the allowed range of $750 to $150,000).

=== Motion for injunction ===
On July 6, 2009, the plaintiffs filed a motion asking for an injunction against Thomas-Rasset that would require her to destroy all infringing sound recordings on her computer and desist from any further infringement of their copyrights. Their motion claims trial evidence established that Thomas-Rasset "was distributing 1,702 sound recordings ... to millions of other users," and that the plaintiffs would face "great and irreparable harm" were she to continue to infringe upon their copyrights.

=== Reduction of damages and settlement offer ===
Also on July 6, 2009, Thomas-Rasset filed a motion asserting the statutory damage award was so disproportionate to actual damages as to be unconstitutional, and announcing her intention to appeal two prior court orders permitting the plaintiffs to present certain evidence at trial. The evidence in question included allegedly incomplete and therefore inadmissible copyright registrations, and Thomas-Rasset claimed that evidence collected by MediaSentry should have been inadmissible because it was collected in violation of state private investigator and wiretap statutes. The motion called for either a retrial with that evidence suppressed, a reduction of damages to the statutory minimum ($750 per song; $18,000 total), or a removal of statutory damages altogether.

The following January, Judge Davis reduced the amount of the damages to $54,000 under the common law doctrine of remittitur, characterizing the original damages as "monstrous and shocking."

A few days later, the plaintiffs proposed a $25,000 settlement to Thomas-Rasset. She declined. The plaintiffs then rejected the damage reduction ordered by the judge. On June 18, the court appointed a special master to facilitate negotiations due to the parties' failure to reach a settlement.

=== Third trial ===
After unsuccessful negotiations, a third trial to re-determine the amount of damages was set for October 4, 2010, later rescheduled to November 1, 2010.

For this trial, the jury was instructed that the issues of the defendant's liability and willfulness had been determined by a previous jury, and in determining the damage amounts, it "may consider the willfulness of the defendant's conduct, the defendant's innocence, the defendant's continuation of infringement after notice or knowledge of the copyright or in reckless disregard of the copyright, the effect of the defendant's prior or concurrent copyright infringement activity, whether profit or gain was established, the value of the copyright, the need to deter this defendant and other potential infringers, and any mitigating circumstances." The amounts were to be assessed within the statutory range of $750 to $150,000 per song. On November 4, 2010, a jury in Minneapolis decided that the amount should be $62,500 per song, for a total award to the plaintiffs of $1.5 million.

A month later, Thomas-Rasset's attorneys requested that the court reduce the award to either zero or an amount the court believes is constitutional, arguing that the Due Process Clause had been violated because the plaintiffs hadn't proven that the defendant, specifically, had caused them any actual harm, only that file sharing, in general, had.

In July 2011, the court ruled that the $1.5 million award was "so severe and oppressive as to be wholly disproportioned to the offense and obviously unreasonable." The court again reduced the jury award to $54,000, or $2,250 per song. The record labels filed for appeal in the Eighth Circuit on August 22.

=== Appellate proceedings ===
In December 2011, in its opening brief for the appeal, the plaintiffs asked the court to hear oral arguments pertaining to the exclusivity of the distribution right and the constitutionality of statutory damages which bear no relation to actual damages. The Motion Picture Association of America (MPAA), concerned about the ramifications of the case for its industry, filed an amicus curiae brief providing further arguments in favor of the plaintiffs' point of view. Both briefs contend that making-available is a form of distribution, and that actual damages are irrelevant to statutory damages.

In March 2012, the plaintiffs, citing the St. Louis, I. M. & S. Railway Co. v. Williams case as precedent, argued that due process was satisfied by a jury's statutory damage award, regardless of whether it bears "a reasonable relation to the plaintiff's actual injury...regardless of whether actual damages can be proven, regardless of whether the defendant's infringement was willful, and regardless of Congress's interest in deterring conduct deemed to be contrary to the public interest."

In an effort to simplify the case to deal only with the constitutionality of a very large statutory damage award against a noncommercial file-sharer, Thomas-Rasset agreed to drop the making-available issue and accept an injunction against further making-available of copyrighted works to the public, but asked the court to explicitly state that no decision had been reached on the issue and that it was merely being set aside.

Oral arguments were presented June 12, 2012, before judges Murphy, Melloy, and Colloton.

On September 11, 2012, the court concluded the District Court made two errors:

1. The original damage award of $222,000 was constitutional, subject to the Williams standard, and should not have been reduced on due process grounds; and
2. The District Court's injunction against Thomas-Rasset should have included a prohibition on making available sound recordings for distribution.

The court declined to rule on whether making-available infringes the distribution right, as it was not an issue decided by the lower court. The case was remanded to the District Court for a judgment that includes these remedies.

Thomas-Rasset's counsel asked the Supreme Court for certiorari, primarily reasoning that the statutory damage award is (in effect) punitive, so case law relating to punitive damages should apply. The RIAA, reaffirming prior arguments and pointing out that there is no disagreement among the lower courts, urged that the petition be rejected. The court denied certiorari on March 18, 2013.

=== Aftermath ===
In March 2013, Thomas-Rasset announced she would declare bankruptcy to avoid paying the RIAA the $222,000. The RIAA suggested that it would accept a lower payment if Thomas-Rasset would make a video about copyright infringement, which she refused. As of April 2016, the RIAA had not announced receipt of any payments from Thomas-Rasset.

== See also ==
- Trade group efforts against file sharing
- Sony BMG v. Tenenbaum
