= History of tariffs in the United States =

Tariffs have historically played a key role in the trade policy of the United States. Economic historian Douglas Irwin classifies U.S. tariff history into three periods: a revenue period (ca. 1790–1860), a restriction period (1861–1933) and a reciprocity period (from 1934 onwards). In the first period, from 1790 to 1860, average tariffs increased from 20 percent to 60 percent before declining again to 20 percent. From 1861 to 1933, which Irwin characterizes as the "restriction period", the average tariffs rose to 50 percent and remained at that level for several decades. From 1934 onwards, in the "reciprocity period", the average tariff declined substantially until it leveled off at 5 percent. Especially after 1942, the U.S. began to promote worldwide free trade. After the 2016 presidential election which saw the election of Donald Trump who campaigned on a protectionist and economic nationalist political platform, the US increased trade protectionism.

According to Irwin, tariffs were intended to serve three primary purposes: "to raise revenue for the government, to restrict imports and protect domestic producers from foreign competition, and to reach reciprocity agreements that reduce trade barriers."

According to Irwin, a common myth about U.S. trade policy is that low import duties harmed American manufacturers in the early 19th century and then that high import duties made the United States into a great industrial power in the late 19th century. As its share of global manufacturing powered from 23% in 1870 to 36% in 1913, the admittedly high tariffs of the time came with a cost, estimated at around 0.5% of GDP in the mid-1870s. In some industries, they might have sped up development by a few years. However, U.S. economic growth during its protectionist era was driven more by its abundant resources and openness to people and ideas.

== Tariff revenues ==
U.S. Historical Tariffs (Customs) and Tax Collections by the Federal Government
(All dollar amounts are in millions of U.S. dollars)
Year	Tariff Income	Budget % Tariff	Federal Receipts	Income Tax	Payroll Tax	Average Tariff
1792	$4.4	95.0%	$4.6	$-	$-	15.1%
1795	$5.6	91.6%	$6.1	$-	$-	8.0%
1800	$9.1	83.7%	$10.8	$-	$-	10.0%
1805	$12.9	95.4%	$13.6	$-	$-	10.7%
1810	$8.6	91.5%	$9.4	$-	$-	10.1%
1815	$7.3	46.4%	$15.7	$-	$-	6.5%
1820	$15.0	83.9%	$17.9	$-	$-	20.2%
1825	$20.1	97.9%	$20.5	$-	$-	22.3%
1830	$21.9	88.2%	$24.8	$-	$-	35.0%
1835	$19.4	54.1%	$35.8	$-	$-	14.2%
1840	$12.5	64.2%	$19.5	$-	$-	12.7%
1845	$27.5	91.9%	$30.0	$-	$-	24.3%
1850	$39.7	91.0%	$43.6	$-	$-	22.9%
1855	$53.0	81.2%	$65.4	$-	$-	20.6%
1860	$53.2	94.9%	$56.1	$-	$-	15.0%
1863	$63.0	55.9%	$112.7	$-	$-	25.9%
1864	$102.3	38.7%	$264.6	$-	$-	32.3%
1865	$84.9	25.4%	$333.7	$61.0	$-	35.6%
1870	$194.5	47.3%	$411.3	$37.8	$-	44.6%
1875	$157.2	54.6%	$288.0	$-	$-	36.1%
1880	$184.5	55.3%	$333.5	$-	$-	27.6%
1885	$181.5	56.1%	$323.7	$-	$-	32.6%
1890	$229.7	57.0%	$403.1	$-	$-	27.6%
1900	$233.2	41.1%	$567.2	$-	$-	27.4%
1910	$233.7	34.6%	$675.2	$-	$-	15.0%
1913	$318.8	44.0%	$724.1	$35.0	$-	17.6%
1915	$209.8	30.1%	$697.9	$47.0	$-	12.5%
1916	$213.7	27.3%	$782.5	$121.0	$-	8.9%
1917	$225.9	20.1%	$1,124.3	$373.0	$-	7.7%
1918	$947.0	25.8%	$3,664.6	$2,720.0	$-	31.2%
1920	$886.0	13.2%	$6,694.6	$4,032.0	$-	16.8%
1925	$547.6	14.5%	$3,780.1	$1,697.0	$-	13.0%
1928	$566.0	14.0%	$4,042.3	$2,088.0	$-	13.8%
1930	$587.0	14.1%	$4,177.9	$2,300.0	$-	19.2%
1935	$318.8	8.4%	$3,800.5	$1,100.0	$-	15.6%
1940	$331.0	6.1%	$5,387.1	$2,100.0	$800.0	12.6%
1942	$369.0	2.9%	$12,799.1	$7,900.0	$1,200.0	13.4%
1944	$417.0	0.9%	$44,148.9	$34,400.0	$1,900.0	10.6%
1946	$424.0	0.9%	$46,400.0	$28,000.0	$1,900.0	7.7%
1948	$408.0	0.9%	$47,300.0	$29,000.0	$2,500.0	5.5%
1950	$407.0	0.9%	$43,800.0	$26,200.0	$3,000.0	4.5%
1951	$609.0	1.1%	$56,700.0	$35,700.0	$4,100.0	5.5%
1955	$585.0	0.8%	$71,900.0	$46,400.0	$6,100.0	5.1%
1960	$1,105.0	1.1%	$99,800.0	$62,200.0	$12,200.0	7.3%
1965	$1,442.0	1.2%	$116,800.0	$74,300.0	$22,200.0	6.7%
1970	$2,430.0	1.3%	$192,800.0	$123,200.0	$44,400.0	6.0%
1975	$3,676.0	1.3%	$279,100.0	$163,000.0	$84,500.0	3.7%
1980	$7,174.0	1.4%	$517,100.0	$308,700.0	$157,800.0	2.9%
1985	$12,079.0	1.6%	$734,000.0	$395,900.0	$255,200.0	3.6%
1990	$11,500.0	1.1%	$1,032,000.0	$560,400.0	$380,000.0	2.8%
1995	$19,301.0	1.4%	$1,361,000.0	$747,200.0	$484,500.0	2.6%
2000	$19,914.0	1.0%	$2,025,200.0	$1,211,700.0	$652,900.0	1.6%
2005	$23,379.0	1.1%	$2,153,600.0	$1,205,500.0	$794,100.0	1.4%
2010	$25,298.0	1.2%	$2,162,700.0	$1,090,000.0	$864,800.0	1.3%
--------------------------------------------------------------------------------------------
Notes: All dollar amounts are in millions of U.S. dollars Income taxes include Individual and Corporate taxes Federal expenditures often exceed Revenue by temporary borrowings. Initially the U.S. Federal Government was financed mainly by customs(tariffs Average Tariff Rate % = Customs Revenue/ cost of Imports (goods). Other taxes collected are: Income Tax, Corporate Income Tax, Inheritance, Tariffs—often called Customs or duties on imports, etc. Income Taxes began in 1913 with the passage of 16th Amendment. Payroll taxes are Social Security and Medicare taxes Payroll Taxes began in 1940. Many Federal government Excise taxes are assigned to Trust Funds and are collected for and "dedicated" to a particular Trust. Sources: Historical Statistics of the United States (Colonial Times to 1957); Historical Statistics of the United States (Colonial Times to 1970); Bicentennial Edition Historical Statistics of the United States, Colonial Times to 1970; Historical Tables; U.S. imports for consumption, duties collected, and ratio of duties to value, 1891–2016; U.S. imports for consumption under tariff preference programs, 1976–2016; U.S. Trade in Goods and Services-Balance of Payments (BOP) Basis, 1960–2010

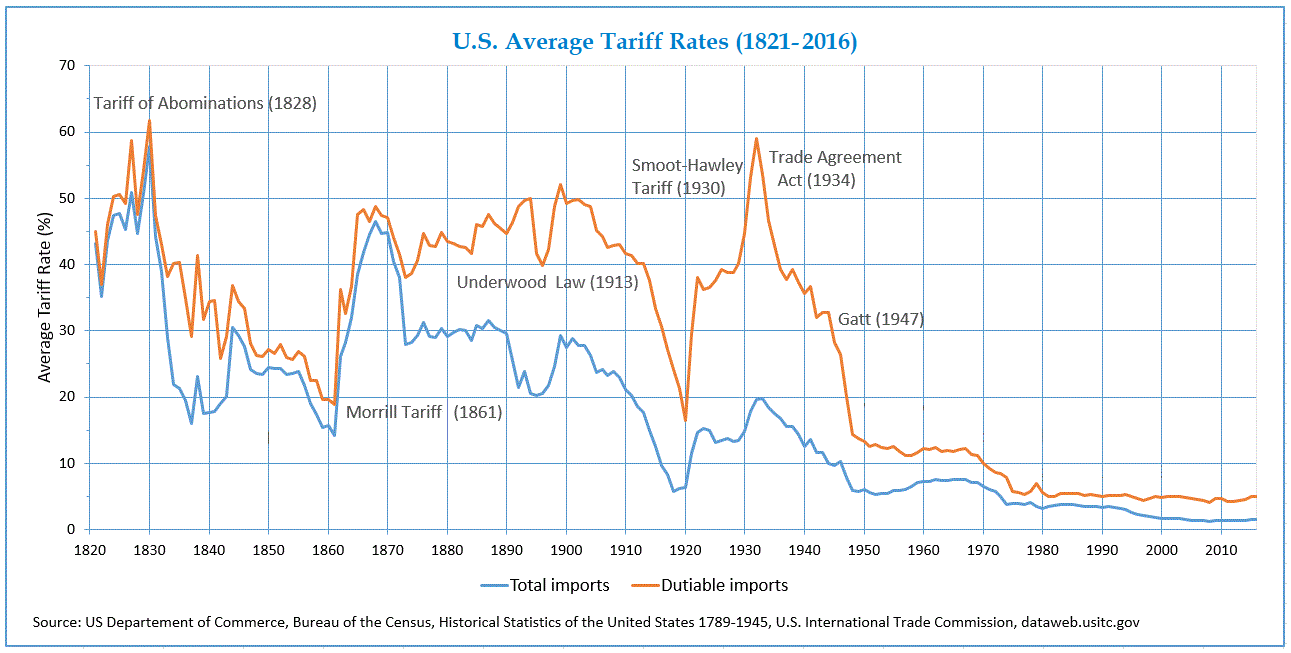
The average U.S. tariff rates, 1821–2016. Two types of tariff measures are shown: the average tariff on total imports and the average tariff on dutiable imports. The difference between them widened after the Civil War due to the introduction of duty-free goods such as coffee and tea, which were not produced domestically. From the 1980s onward, free-trade agreements also contributed to this divergence by allowing certain imports to enter duty-free.

Federal revenue by type, 1792–2016

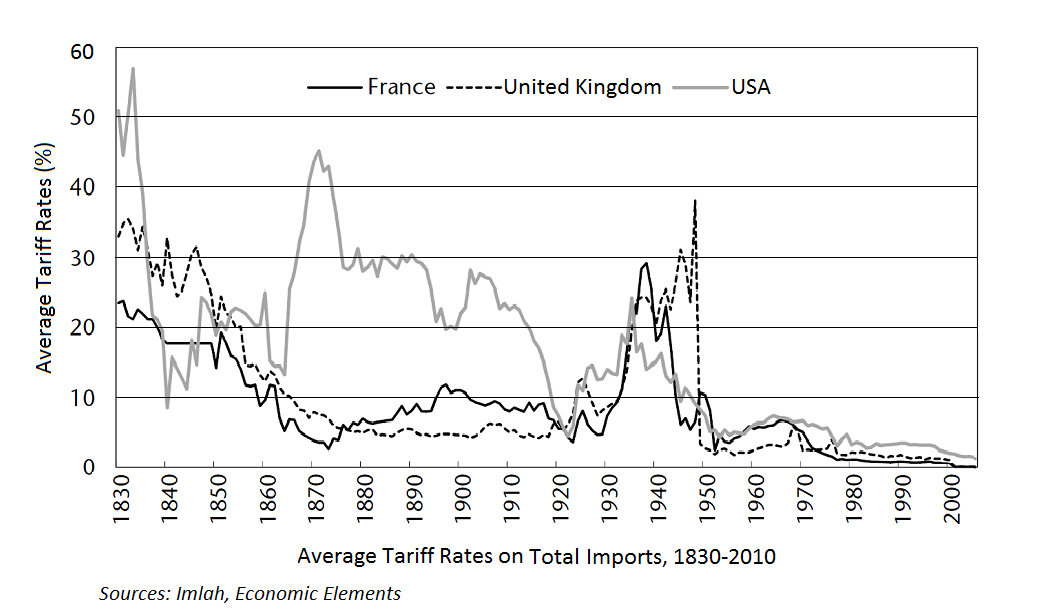
Average tariff rates in France, UK, US

The evolution of U.S. tariff policy from 1790 to 2019 can be divided into three distinct periods, each characterized by a different primary objective: revenue generation (1790–1860), import restriction (1861–1933), and reciprocity through trade agreements (1934–present). During the revenue period, average tariffs increased from approximately 20% to 60%, before declining again to around 20% by 1860. In the subsequent restriction period, the average tariff on dutiable imports rose to roughly 50% and remained at that level for several decades. Beginning in 1934, the reciprocity period marked a sharp decline in tariff rates, which eventually stabilized at approximately 5%, a level that has persisted into the 21st century.

Many of the fluctuations in average tariffs over time were not the result of deliberate policy shifts, but rather due to changes in import prices interacting with “specific duties”—fixed dollar amounts per unit of quantity, rather than percentages of import value. For example, price increases during World War I and deflation during the Great Depression produced temporary spikes and dips in the average tariff level. A significant drop in tariffs following World War II was largely driven by inflation: roughly two-thirds of the decline between 1944 and 1950 resulted from rising prices, and one-third from tariff reductions negotiated at the first GATT conference in 1947.

Although the average tariff on dutiable imports has fluctuated considerably over time, the underlying tariff rates set by policymakers have been more stable than the raw data might suggest. These rates are typically structured to reflect the overarching goals of revenue generation, import restriction, or trade reciprocity.

== Colonial Era and American Revolution ==
Trade policy was a subject of controversy even prior to the independence of the United States. The thirteen North American colonies were subject to the restrictive framework of the Navigation Acts, which directed most colonial trade through Britain. Approximately three-quarters of colonial exports were enumerated goods that had to pass through a British port before being reexported elsewhere, a policy that reduced the prices received by American planters.

Scholars have long debated whether British mercantilist policies primarily benefited British shipping interests at the expense of the colonies, thereby contributing to the tensions leading to the American Revolution. In an early estimate, Harper (1939) calculated that these trade restrictions cost the colonies about 2.3% of their income in 1773. This estimate excludes potential benefits of imperial membership, such as reduced defense costs and lower shipping insurance rates due to Royal Navy protection. Nevertheless, British mercantilist restrictions are generally considered to have played a role in colonial demands for independence. It is estimated that about 90% of the economic burden imposed by the Navigation Acts fell on the southern colonies, particularly tobacco growers in Maryland and Virginia, potentially reducing regional income by up to 2.5% in 1770 and contributing to support for independence.

Available data from the era indicate that American foreign trade declined sharply during the Revolutionary War and remained subdued into the 1780s. Trade revived during the 1790s but remained volatile due to ongoing military conflicts in Europe.

== Early National period, 1789–1828 ==
The framers of the United States Constitution gave the federal government authority to tax, stating that Congress has the power to "lay and collect taxes, duties, imposts and excises, pay the debts and provide for the common defense and general welfare of the United States." and also "To regulate Commerce with foreign Nations, and among the several States, and with the Indian Tribes." Tariffs between states is prohibited by the U.S. Constitution, and all domestically made products can be imported or shipped to another state tax-free.

Responding to an urgent need for federal revenue and in light of concerns over the trade balance, the First United States Congress passed, and President George Washington signed, the Hamilton Tariff of 1789, which authorized the collection of duties on imported goods. Customs duties as set by tariff rates up to 1860 were usually about 80–95% of all federal revenue. Having just fought a war over taxation, among other things, the U.S. Congress wanted a reliable source of income that was relatively unobtrusive and easy to collect.

There was a consensus among the Founding Fathers that tariffs were the most efficient way of raising public funds as well as the most politically acceptable. Early sales taxes in the post-colonial period were highly controversial, difficult to enforce, and costly to administer. This was evident during events like the Whiskey Rebellion, where the enforcement of sales taxes led to significant resistance. Similarly, an income tax did not make sense for numerous reasons, particularly due to the complexities of tracking and collecting it. In contrast, tariffs were a simpler solution. Imports entered the United States primarily through a limited number of ports, such as Boston, New York City, Philadelphia, Baltimore, and Charleston, South Carolina. This concentration of imports made it easier to impose taxes directly at these points, streamlining the process of collection. Furthermore, tariffs were less visible to the general public because they were built into the price of goods, reducing political resistance. The system allowed for efficient revenue generation without the immediate visibility or perceived burden of other tax forms, contributing to its political acceptability among the Founders.

In December 1791, Treasury Secretary Alexander Hamilton presented his Report on Manufactures to Congress. The presented both a theoretical defense of domestic industrial development and a set of concrete policy proposals. Hamilton recommended measures such as increased import duties on finished goods, reduced duties on raw materials, production subsidies (bounties) for key industries, and government support for the immigration of skilled labor.

Economic historian Douglas Irwin argues that Alexander Hamilton’s protectionist reputation is often overstated. While Hamilton is commonly associated with high tariffs due to his Report on Manufactures (1791), Irwin notes that the report is “much more nuanced than is commonly portrayed.” Although Hamilton supported the promotion of domestic manufacturing at a time when the United States had little industrial development, he favored “subsidies and encouragements to invest rather than high tariffs” and believed that tariffs were not particularly effective in fostering industrial growth. According to Irwin, Hamilton aimed to support manufacturing without necessarily shielding it from foreign competition, recognizing that excessive protection could lead to inefficiency and reduce overall trade. Irwin emphasizes the importance of historical context, pointing out that the United States had just emerged from war with Britain and was still predominantly an agricultural society with very different conditions than in later centuries.

Ashley notes that:

From 1790 onwards there were constant alterations in the tariff between 1792 and 1816 there were some twenty-five Tariff Acts passed, all modifying the customs duties in one way or another. But Hamilton's Report, and the ideas it embodied, do not seem to have exercised any special influence on the legislation of this period; the motives were always financial.

President Thomas Jefferson initiated an unprecedented policy experiment by enacting a complete embargo on maritime commerce, with Congressional support, beginning in December 1807. The stated objective of the embargo was to protect American vessels and sailors from becoming entangled in the Anglo-French naval conflict (the Napoleonic Wars). The embargo was enacted through the Embargo Act of 1807, and later modified by the Non-Intercourse Act of 1809, which restricted trade only with Britain and France. Imports declined sharply, causing shortages and price increases for various goods. While intended as a measure of economic coercion, the embargo primarily harmed domestic commerce and became widely unpopular. By mid-1808, the United States had reached near-autarkic conditions, representing one of the most extreme peacetime interruptions of international trade in its history. The embargo, which remained in effect until March 1809, imposed significant economic costs. Irwin (2005) estimates that the static welfare loss associated with the embargo was approximately 5% of GDP.

The War of 1812 brought a similar set of problems as U.S. trade was again restricted by British naval blockades. The fiscal crisis was made much worse by the abolition of the First Bank of the U.S., which was the national bank. It was reestablished right after the war.

Tariffs were significantly raised with the Tariff of 1828. It was called the Tariff of Abominations by its Southern detractors because of the effects it had on the Southern economy. It set a 38% tax on some imported goods and a 45% tax on certain imported raw materials. Intense political opposition to higher tariffs came from Southern Democrats and plantation owners in South Carolina who had little manufacturing industry and imported some products with high tariffs. They would have to pay more for imports. They claimed their economic interest was being unfairly injured. They attempted to "nullify" the federal tariff and spoke of secession from the Union (see the Nullification Crisis). President Andrew Jackson let it be known he would use the U.S. Army to enforce the law, and no state supported the South Carolina call for nullification. A compromise ended the crisis included a lowering of the average tariff rate over ten years to a rate of 15% to 20%.

== Second Party System, 1829–1859 ==
From 1832 to 1860, the Democrats tried to lower the tariff. The Tariff of 1832 eliminated certain features of the Tariff of 1828 that were disliked by manufacturers and the commercial East, but increased the duty on woolens. The Compromise Tariff of 1833 gradually reduced duties above 20% by removing one tenth from each impost in excess of that level at 2-year intervals. The Tariff of 1842 returned the tariff to the level of 1832, with duties averaging between 23% and 35%. The Walker Tariff of 1846 essentially focused on revenue and reversed the trend of substituting specific for ad valorem duties. The Tariff of 1857 reduced the tariff to a general level of 20%, the lowest rate since 1830, and expanded the free list.

The Democrats dominated the Second Party System and set low tariffs designed to pay for the government but not protect industry. Their opponents the Whigs wanted high protective tariffs but usually were outvoted in Congress. Tariffs soon became a major political issue as the Whigs (1832–1852) and after 1854, the Republicans wanted to protect their mostly northern industries and constituents by voting for higher tariffs and the Southern Democrats, which had very little industry but imported many goods voted for lower tariffs.

Each party as it came into power voted to raise or lower tariffs under the constraints that the Federal Government always needed a certain level of revenues. The United States public debt was paid off in 1834 and President Andrew Jackson, a strong Southern Democrat, oversaw the cutting of the tariff rates roughly in half and eliminating nearly all federal excise taxes in about 1835.

Henry Clay and his Whig Party, envisioning a rapid modernization based on highly productive factories, sought a high tariff. Their key argument was that startup factories, or "infant industries", would at first be less efficient than European (British) producers. American factory workers were paid higher wages than their European competitors. The arguments proved highly persuasive in industrial districts. Clay's position was adopted in the 1828 and 1832 Tariff Acts. The Nullification Crisis forced a partial abandonment of the Whig position. When the Whigs won victories in the 1840 and 1842 elections, taking control of Congress, they re-instituted higher tariffs with the Tariff of 1842. In examining these debates Moore finds that they were not precursors to Civil War. Instead they looked backward and continued the old debate whether foreign trade policy should embrace free trade or protectionism.

=== Walker Tariff ===
The Democrats won in 1845, electing James K. Polk as president. Polk succeeded in passing the Walker tariff of 1846 by uniting the rural and agricultural factions of the entire country for lower tariffs. They sought a level of a "tariff for revenue only" that would pay the cost of government but not show favoritism to one section or economic sector at the expense of another. The Walker Tariff actually increased trade with Britain and others and brought in more revenue to the federal treasury than the higher tariff. The average tariff on the Walker Tariff was about 25%. While protectionists in Pennsylvania and neighboring states were angered, the South achieved its goal of setting low tariff rates before the Civil War.

=== Low tariff of 1857 ===
The Walker Tariff remained in place until 1857, when a nonpartisan coalition lowered them again with the Tariff of 1857 to 18%. This was in response to the British repeal of their protectionist "Corn Laws".

The Democrats in Congress, dominated by Southern Democrats, wrote and passed the tariff laws in the 1830s, 1840s, and 1850s, and kept reducing rates, so that the 1857 rates were down to about 15%, a move that boosted trade so overwhelmingly that revenues actually increased, from just over $20 million in 1840 ($0.6 billion in 2024 dollars), to more than $80 million by 1856 ($2.2 billion). The South had almost no complaints but the low rates angered many Northern industrialists and factory workers, especially in Pennsylvania, who demanded protection for their growing iron industry. The Republican Party replaced the Whigs in 1854 and also favored high tariffs to stimulate industrial growth; it was part of the 1860 Republican platform.

=== Third Party System ===
After the Second Party System ended in 1854 the Democrats lost control and the new Republican Party had its opportunity to raise rates. The Morrill Tariff significantly raising tariff rates became possible only after the Southern Senators walked out of Congress when their states left the Union, leaving a Republican majority. It was signed by Democratic President James Buchanan in early March 1861 shortly before President Abraham Lincoln took office. Pennsylvania iron mills and New England woolen mills mobilized businessmen and workers to call for high tariffs, but Republican merchants wanted low tariffs.

The high tariff advocates lost in 1857, but stepped up their campaign by blaming the economic recession of 1857 on the lower rates. Economist Henry Charles Carey of Philadelphia was the most outspoken advocate, along with Horace Greeley and his influential newspaper, the New York Tribune.

== Civil War ==
In February 1861, increases were enacted after Southerners resigned their seats in Congress on the eve of the Civil War. During the war far more revenue was needed, so the rates were raised again and again, along with many other taxes such as excise taxes on luxuries and income taxes on the rich. By far most of the wartime government revenue came from bonds and loans ($2.6 billion), not taxes ($357 million) or tariffs ($305 million).

The Morrill Tariff took effect a few weeks before the war began on April 12, 1861, and was not collected in the South. The Confederate States of America (CSA) passed its own tariff of about 15% on most items, including many items that previously were duty-free from the North. Previously tariffs between states were prohibited. The Confederates believed that they could finance their government by tariffs. The anticipated tariff revenue never appeared as the Union Navy blockaded their ports and the Union army restricted their trade with the Northern states. The Confederacy collected a mere $3.5 million in tariff revenue from the Civil War start to end and had to resort to inflation and confiscation instead for revenue.

Most historians in recent decades have minimized the tariff issue as a cause of the war, noting that few people in 1860–61 said it was of central importance to them. Compromises were proposed in 1860–61 to save the Union, but they did not involve the tariff. Arguably, the effects of a tariff enacted in March 1861 could have made little effect upon any delegation which met prior to its signing. It is indicative of the Northern industrial supported and anti-agrarian position of the 1861 Republican-controlled congress. Some secessionist documents do mention a tariff issue, though not nearly as often as the preservation of the institution of slavery. However, a few libertarian economists place more importance on the tariff issue.

According to economist Douglas Irwin, tariffs played little to no role in causing the Civil War. After the 1828 Tariff of Abominations, South Carolina threatened secession, but the crisis was resolved through the Compromise of 1833, which led to a steady decline in tariffs. Further reductions followed in 1846 and 1857, bringing the average tariff below 20% on the eve of the war—one of the lowest levels in the antebellum period. Irwin notes that Southern Democrats had substantial influence over trade policy until the Civil War. He rejects the revisionist claim — often associated with the Lost Cause narrative—that the Morrill Tariff triggered the conflict. Instead, Irwin argues that the Morrill Tariff only passed because Southern states had already seceded and their representatives were no longer in Congress to oppose it. It was signed by President James Buchanan, a Democrat, before Lincoln took office. In short, Irwin finds no evidence that tariffs were a major cause of the Civil War.

== 1866–1912 ==
The Civil War shifted political power from the South to the North, benefiting the Republican Party, which favored protective tariffs. As a result, trade policy focused more on restriction than revenue, and average tariffs increased. From 1861 to 1932, the Republicans dominated American politics and drew their political support from the North, where manufacturing interests were concentrated. Republicans supported high tariffs to limit imports, leading to rates rising to 40–50% during the Civil War and remaining at that level for several decades. During this time, there were 35 sessions of Congress, including 21 under unified government (17 Republican, 4 Democratic) and 14 under divided control. Over the span of 72 years, Democrats had only two opportunities to reduce tariffs, which occurred in 1894 and 1913. In both instances, the reductions were promptly reversed when Republicans returned to power. Throughout these periods, existing trade policy was strongly contested by the opposing party. The status quo was consistently challenged, with critics on both sides warning of national harm if tariffs were not raised or lowered. Nevertheless, despite frequent political disputes, existing trade policies proved difficult to overturn once enacted. Dominant party control and institutional rules contributed to a status quo bias that kept trade policy relatively stable during each era.

=== Reconstruction era ===
Historian Howard K. Beale argued that high tariffs were needed during the Civil War, but were retained after the war for the benefit of Northern industrialists, who would otherwise lose markets and profits. To keep political control of Congress, Beale argued, Northern Industrialists worked through the Republican Party and supported Reconstruction policies that kept low-tariff Southern whites out of power. The Beale thesis was widely disseminated by the influential survey of Charles A. Beard, The Rise of American Civilization (1927).

In the late 1950s historians rejected the Beale–Beard thesis by showing that Northern businessmen were evenly divided on the tariff, and were not using Reconstruction policies to support it.

=== Politics of protection ===
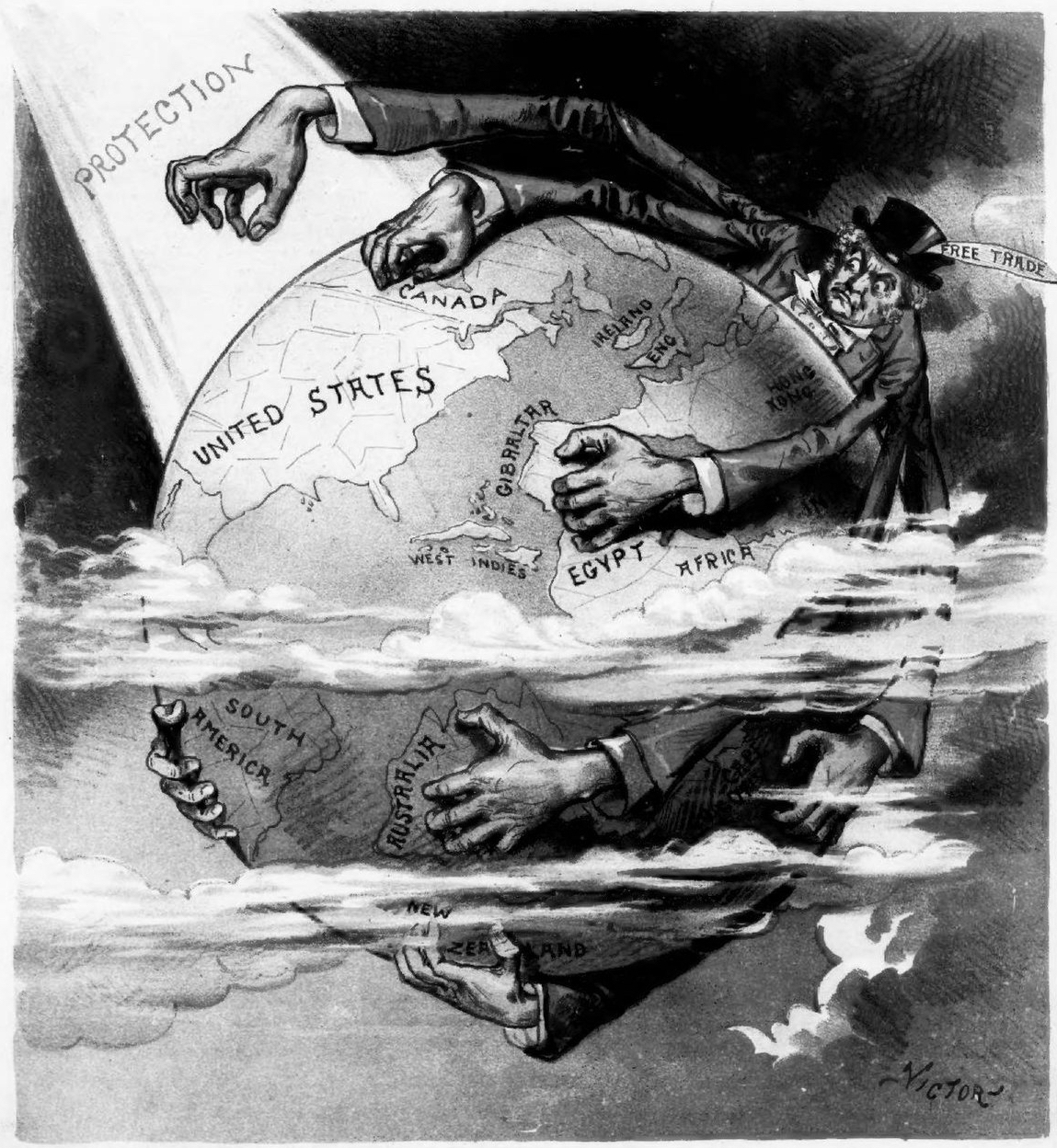
1888 anti-free trade cartoon from Judge. Caption: FREE TRADE ENGLAND WANTS THE EARTH

The iron and steel industry, and the wool industry, were the well-organized interests groups that demanded (and usually obtained) high tariffs through support of the Republican Party. Industrial workers had much higher wages than their European counterparts, and they credited it to the tariff and voted Republican.

Democrats were divided on the issue, in large part because of pro-tariff elements in the Pennsylvania party who wanted to protect the growing iron industry, as well as pockets of high tariff support in nearby industrializing states. However President Grover Cleveland made low tariffs the centerpiece of Democratic Party policies in the late 1880s. His argument was that high tariffs were an unnecessary and unfair tax on consumers. The South and West generally supported low tariffs, and the industrial East high tariffs. Republican William McKinley was the outstanding spokesman for high tariffs, promising it would bring prosperity for all groups. The McKinley Tariff of 1890 raised import prices by 50%.

=== Farmers and wool ===
The Republican high-tariff advocates appealed to farmers with the theme that high-wage factory workers would pay premium prices for foodstuffs. This was the "home market" idea, and it won over most farmers in the Northeast, but it had little relevance to the southern and western farmers who exported most of their cotton, tobacco and wheat. In the late 1860s the wool manufacturers (based near Boston and Philadelphia) formed the first national lobby, and cut deals with wool-growing farmers in several states. Their challenge was that fastidious wool producers in Britain and Australia marketed a higher quality fleece than the Americans, and that British manufacturers had costs as low as the American mills. The result was a wool tariff that helped the farmers by a high tariff rate on imported wool—a tariff the American manufacturers had to pay—together with a high tariff on finished woolens and worsted goods.

=== Cleveland tariff policy ===
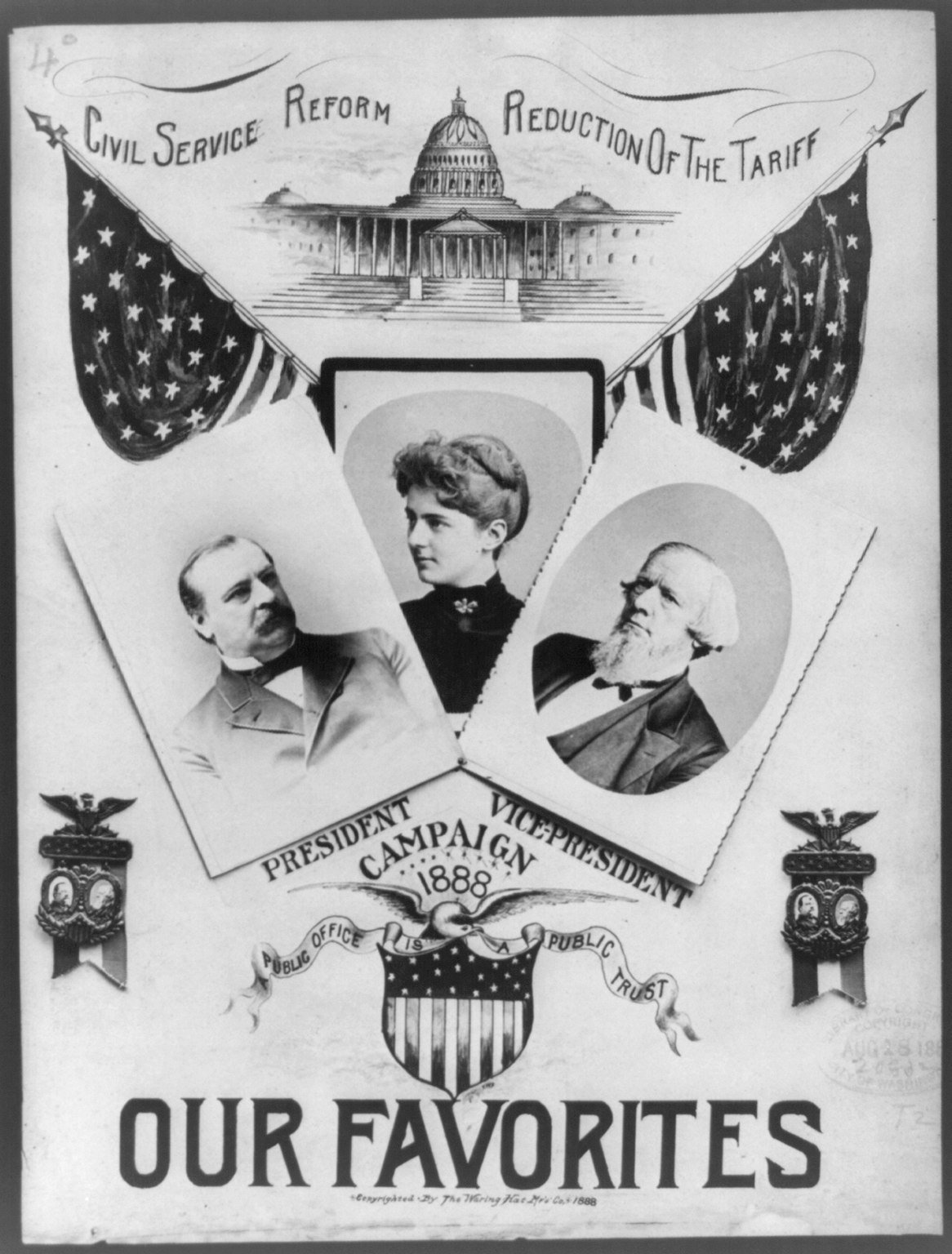
1888 Democratic presidential campaign poster featuring Grover Cleveland promoting tariff reduction and civil service reform.

Democratic President Grover Cleveland redefined the issue in 1887, with his stunning attack on the tariff as inherently corrupt, opposed to true republicanism, and inefficient to boot: "When we consider that the theory of our institutions guarantees to every citizen the full enjoyment of all the fruits of his industry and enterprise... it is plain that the exaction of more than [minimal taxes] is indefensible extortion and a culpable betrayal of American fairness and justice." The election of 1888 was fought primarily over the tariff issue, and Cleveland lost. Republican Congressman William McKinley argued,

Free foreign trade gives our money, our manufactures, and our markets to other nations to the injury of our labor, our tradespeople, and our farmers. Protection keeps money, markets, and manufactures at home for the benefit of our own people.

Democrats campaigned energetically against the high McKinley tariff of 1890, and scored sweeping gains that year; they restored Cleveland to the White House in 1892. The severe depression that started in 1893 ripped apart the Democratic party. Cleveland and the pro-business Bourbon Democrats insisted on a much lower tariff. His problem was that Democratic electoral successes had brought in Democratic congressmen from industrial districts who were willing to raise rates to benefit their constituents. The Wilson–Gorman Tariff Act of 1894 did lower overall rates from 50 percent to 42 percent, but contained so many concessions to protectionism that Cleveland refused to sign it (it became law anyway).

=== McKinley tariff policy ===
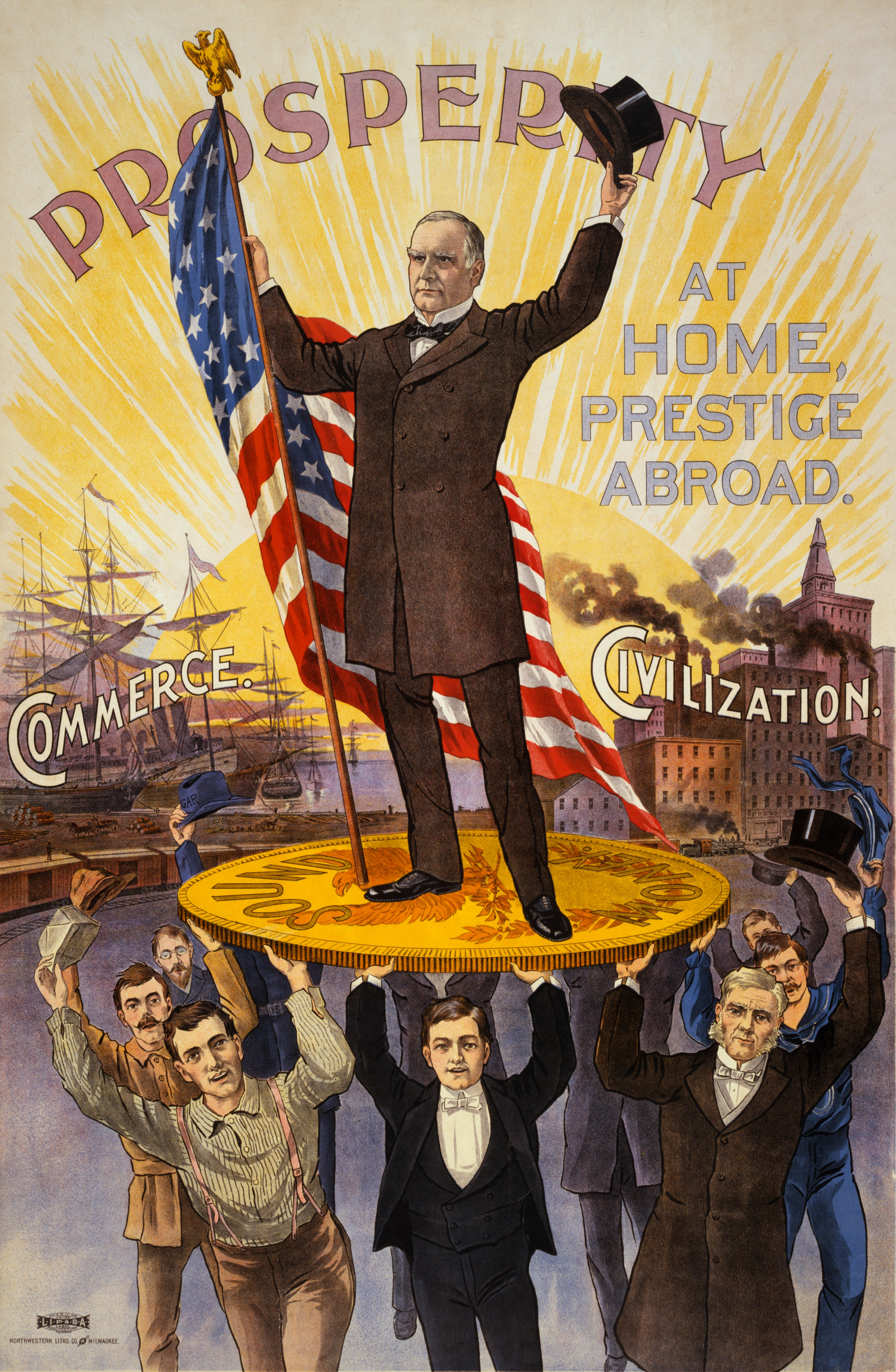
McKinley campaigns in 1900 on gold coin (gold standard) with support from soldiers, businessmen, farmers and professionals, claiming he had secured prosperity at home and victory abroad

The McKinley Tariffs were a major topic of fierce debate in the 1890 congressional elections, which gave a Democratic landslide. Democrats replaced the McKinley Tariff with the Wilson–Gorman Tariff Act in 1894, which lowered tariff rates. The economy plunged into a deep depression 1893 to 1896.

McKinley won the 1896 presidential election arguing for the high tariff as a positive solution to the depression. In 1897, the Republicans rushed through the Dingley tariff, boosting rates back to the 50 percent level. Democrats responded that the high rates created government sponsored "trusts" (monopolies) and led to higher consumer prices. McKinley won reelection by an even bigger landslide and started talking about a post-tariff era of reciprocal trade agreements.

The Republicans split bitterly on the Payne–Aldrich Tariff of 1909. Republican President Theodore Roosevelt (1901–1909) saw the tariff issue was ripping his party apart, so he postponed any consideration of it. The delicate balance flew apart on under Republican William Howard Taft. He campaigned for president in 1908 for tariff "reform", which everyone assumed meant lower rates. The House lowered rates with the Payne Bill, then sent it to the Senate where Nelson Wilmarth Aldrich mobilized high-rate Senators.

Aldrich was a New England businessman and a master of the complexities of the tariff, the Midwestern Republican insurgents were rhetoricians and lawyers who distrusted the special interests and assumed the tariff was "sheer robbery" at the expense of the ordinary consumer. Rural America believed that its superior morality deserved special protection, while the dastardly immorality of the trusts—and cities generally—merited financial punishment. Aldrich’s version of the Payne–Aldrich Tariff Act of 1909 lowered the protection on Midwestern farm products, while raising rates favorable to his Northeast.

By 1913 with the new income tax generating revenue, the Democrats in Congress were able to reduce rates even further with the Underwood Tariff. The outbreak of war in 1914 made the impact of tariffs of much less importance compared to war contracts. When the Republicans returned to power they returned the rates to a high level in the Fordney–McCumber Tariff of 1922. The next raise came with the Smoot–Hawley Tariff Act of 1930 at the start of the Great Depression.

=== Tariff with Canada ===
The Canadian–American Reciprocity Treaty increased trade after 1855. When it ended 1866, Canada turned to tariffs. The National Policy was a Canadian economic program introduced by John A. Macdonald's Conservative Party in 1879 after it returned to power. It had been an official policy, however, since 1876. It was based on high tariffs to protect Canada's manufacturing industry. Macdonald campaigned on the policy in the 1878 election, and handily beat the Liberal Party, which supported free trade.

Efforts to restore free trade with Canada collapsed when Canada rejected a proposed reciprocity treaty in fear of American imperialism in the 1911 federal election. Taft negotiated a reciprocity agreement with Canada, that had the effect of sharply lowering tariffs. Democrats supported the plan but Midwestern Republicans bitterly opposed it. Barnstorming the country for his agreement, Taft undiplomatically pointed to the inevitable integration of the North American economy, and suggested that Canada should come to a "parting of the ways" with Britain. Canada's Conservative Party, under the leadership of Robert Borden, now had an issue to regain power from the low-tariff Liberals. After a surge of pro-imperial anti-Americanism, the Conservatives won.

Ottawa rejected reciprocity, reasserted the National Policy and went to London first for new financial and trade deals. The Payne Aldrich Tariff of 1909 actually changed little and had slight economic impact one way or the other, but the political impact was enormous. The insurgents felt tricked and defeated and swore vengeance against Wall Street and its minions Taft and Aldrich. The insurgency led to a fatal split down the middle in 1912 as the GOP lost its balance wheel.

== 1913 to 1929 ==
Starting in the Civil War, protection was the ideological cement holding the Republican coalition together. High tariffs were used to promise higher sales to business, higher wages to industrial workers, and higher demand for their crops to farmers. Democrats said it was a tax on the little man. After 1900 Progressive insurgents said it promoted monopoly. It had greatest support in the Northeast, and greatest opposition in the South and West. The Midwest was the battle ground.

The tariff issue was pulling the GOP apart. Roosevelt tried to postpone the issue, but Taft had to meet it head on in 1909 with the Payne–Aldrich Tariff Act. Eastern conservatives led by Nelson W. Aldrich wanted high tariffs on manufactured goods (especially woolens), while Midwesterners called for low tariffs. Aldrich outmaneuvered them by lowering the tariff on farm products, which outraged the farmers. The great battle over the high Payne–Aldrich Tariff Act in 1910 ripped the Republicans apart and set up the realignment in favor of the Democrats.

Woodrow Wilson made a drastic lowering of tariff rates a major priority for his presidency. The 1913 Underwood Tariff cut rates, but the coming of World War I in 1914 radically revised trade patterns. Reduced trade and, especially, the new revenues generated by the federal income tax made tariffs much less important in terms of economic impact and political rhetoric. The Wilson administration desired a 'revamping' of the current banking system, "... so that the banks may be the instruments, not the masters, of business and of individual enterprise and initiative.".

President Wilson achieved this in the Federal Reserve Act of 1913. Working with the bullish Senator Aldrich and former presidential candidate William Jennings Bryan, he perfected a way to centralize the banking system to allow Congress to closely allocate paper money production.

The Federal Reserve Act, with the Sixteenth Amendment of the Constitution, would create a trend of new forms of government funding. The Democrats lowered the tariff in 1913 but the economic dislocations of the First World War made it irrelevant. When the Republicans returned to power in 1921 they again imposed a protective tariff. They raised it again with the Smoot–Hawley Tariff Act of 1930 to meet the Great Depression in the United States. But that made the depression worse. This time it backfired, as Canada, Britain, Germany, France and other industrial countries retaliated with their own tariffs and special, bilateral trade deals. American imports and exports both went into a tailspin.

The Democrats promised an end to protection on a reciprocal country-by-country basis (which they did), hoping this would expand foreign trade (which it did not). By 1936 the tariff issue had faded from politics, and the revenue it raised was small. In World War II, both tariffs and reciprocity were insignificant compared to trade channeled through Lend-Lease.

== Smoot–Hawley Tariff Act and the Great Depression ==
The Tariff Act of 1930, commonly known as the Smoot–Hawley Tariff, is considered one of the most controversial tariff laws ever enacted by the United States Congress. The act raised the average tariff on dutiable imports from approximately 40% to 47%, though price deflation during the Great Depression caused the effective rate to rise to nearly 60% by 1932. The Smoot–Hawley Tariff was implemented as the global economy was entering a severe downturn. The Great Depression of 1929–1933 represented an economic collapse for both the United States—where real GDP declined by about 25% and unemployment exceeded 20%—and much of the world. As international trade contracted, trade barriers multiplied, unemployment increased, and industrial output declined worldwide, leading many to attribute part of the global economic crisis to the Smoot–Hawley Tariff. The extent to which this legislation contributed to the depth of the Great Depression has remained a subject of ongoing debate.

Economist Douglas Irwin assesses the impact of the Smoot–Hawley Tariff Act of 1930: in the two years following the imposition of the Smoot-Hawley tariff in June 1930, the volume of U.S. imports fell by over 40%. He shows that part of this collapse in trade is attributed to the tariff itself, and not to other factors such as falling incomes or foreign retaliation. Partial and general equilibrium evaluations indicate that the Smoot-Hawley tariff reduced imports by between 4% and 8% (ceteris paribus). In addition, a counterfactual simulation suggests that almost a quarter of the observed 40% drop in imports can be attributed to the increase in the effective tariff (i.e. Smoot-Hawley plus deflation).

Irwin argues that while the Smoot-Hawley Tariff Act was not the primary cause of the Great Depression, it contributed to its severity by provoking international retaliation and reducing global trade. The Smoot-Hawley Tariff Act raised the average level of tariffs on dutiable imports by 15 to 18 percent. What mitigated the impact of Smoot-Hawley was the small size of the trade sector at the time. Only a third of total imports to the United States in 1930 were subject to duties, and those dutiable imports represented only 1.4 percent of GDP. According to Irwin, there is no evidence that the legislation achieved its goals of net job creation or economic recovery. Even from a Keynesian perspective, the policy was counterproductive, as the decline in exports exceeded the reduction in imports. While falling foreign incomes were a key factor in the collapse of U.S. exports, the tariff also limited foreign access to U.S. dollars, appreciating the currency and making American goods less competitive abroad. Irwin emphasizes that one of the most damaging consequences of the Act was the deterioration of the United States' trade relations with key partners. Enacted at a time when the League of Nations was seeking to implement a global "tariff truce", the Smoot-Hawley Tariff was widely perceived as a unilateral and hostile move, undermining international cooperation. In his assessment, the most significant long-term impact was that the resentment it generated encouraged other countries to form discriminatory trading blocs. These preferential arrangements, diverted trade away from the United States and hindered the global economic recovery.

== Trade liberalization ==
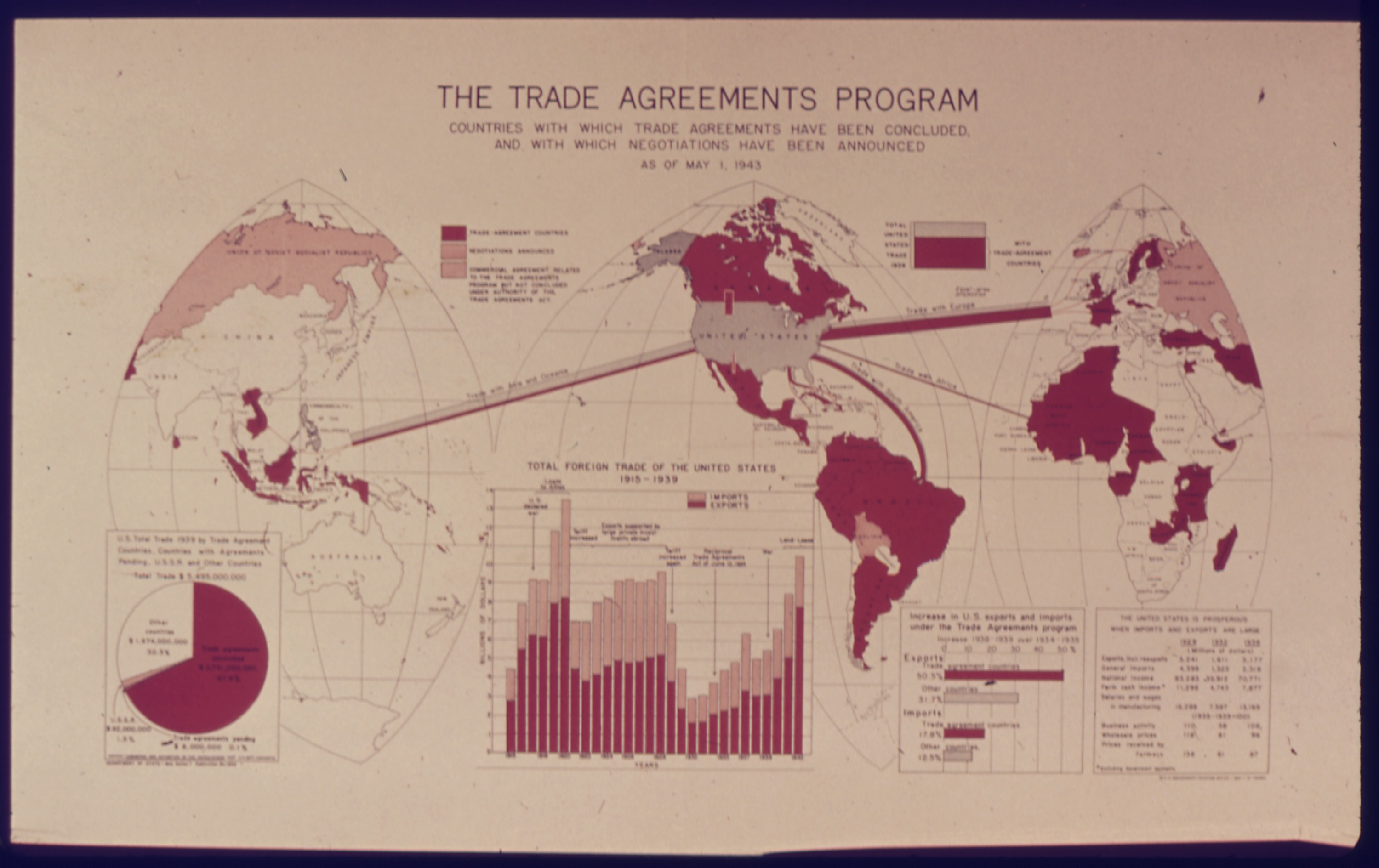
The trade agreements program of the United States (1943)

Tariffs up to the Smoot–Hawley Tariff Act of 1930, were set by Congress after many months of testimony and negotiations. In 1934, the U.S. Congress, in a rare delegation of authority, passed the Reciprocal Tariff Act of 1934, which authorized the executive branch to negotiate bilateral tariff reduction agreements with other countries. The prevailing view then was that trade liberalization may help stimulate economic growth. However, no one country was willing to liberalize unilaterally.

Between 1934 and 1945, the executive branch negotiated over 32 bilateral trade liberalization agreements with other countries. The belief that low tariffs led to a more prosperous country became the predominant belief with some exceptions.

== Post World War II ==
After the war the U.S. promoted the General Agreement on Tariffs and Trade (GATT) established in 1947, to minimize tariffs and other restrictions, and to liberalize trade among all capitalist countries. In 1995 GATT became the World Trade Organization (WTO); with the collapse of Communism its open markets/low tariff ideology became dominant worldwide in the 1990s. Multilateralism has been embodied in the seven tariff reduction rounds between 1948 and 1994. In each of these "rounds", all (GATT) members came together to negotiate mutually agreeable trade liberalization packages and reciprocal tariff rates. In the Uruguay round in 1994, the World Trade Organization (WTO) was established to help establish uniform tariff rates.

American industry and labor prospered after World War II, but hard times set in after 1970. For the first time there was stiff competition from low-cost producers around the globe. Many rust belt industries faded or collapsed, especially the manufacture of steel, TV sets, shoes, toys, textiles and clothing. Toyota and Nissan threatened the giant domestic auto industry. In the late 1970s Detroit and the auto workers union combined to fight for protection. They obtained not high tariffs, but a voluntary restriction of imports from the Japanese government.

Quotas were two-country diplomatic agreements that had the same protective effect as high tariffs, but did not invite retaliation from third countries. By limiting the number of Japanese automobiles that could be imported, quotas inadvertently helped Japanese companies push into larger, and more expensive market segments. The Japanese producers, limited by the number of cars they could export to America, opted to increase the value of their exports to maintain revenue growth. This action threatened the American producers' historical hold on the mid- and large-size car markets.

The Chicken tax was a 1964 response by President Lyndon B. Johnson to tariffs placed by Germany (then West Germany) on importation of US chicken. Beginning in 1962, during the President Kennedy administration, the US accused Europe of unfairly restricting imports of American poultry at the request of West German chicken farmers. Diplomacy failed, and in January 1964, two months after taking office, President Johnson retaliated by imposing a 25 percent tax on all imported light trucks. This directly affected the German built Volkswagen vans.

Officially, it was explained that the light trucks tax would offset the dollar amount of imports of Volkswagen vans from West Germany with the lost American sales of chickens to Europe. But audio tapes from the Johnson White House reveal that in January 1964, President Johnson was attempting to convince United Auto Workers's president Walter Reuther not to initiate a strike just prior to the 1964 election and to support the president's civil rights platform. Reuther in turn wanted Johnson to respond to Volkswagen's increased shipments to the United States.

Until 2025 only about 30% of all import goods were subject to tariffs in the United States, the rest were on the free list. The "average" tariffs charged by the United States were at a historic low. The list of negotiated tariffs are listed on the Harmonized Tariff Schedule as put out by the United States International Trade Commission.

== 1980s to 2000 ==
President Reagan addresses the nation on free and fair trade from Camp David, Maryland; April 25, 1987

During the Ronald Reagan and George H. W. Bush administrations Republicans abandoned protectionist policies, and came out against quotas and in favor of the GATT/WTO policy of minimal economic barriers to global trade. Free trade with Canada came about as a result of the Canada–U.S. Free Trade Agreement of 1987, which led in 1994 to the North American Free Trade Agreement (NAFTA). It was based on Reagan's plan to enlarge the scope of the market for American firms to include Canada and Mexico. President Bill Clinton, with strong Republican support in 1993, pushed NAFTA through Congress over the vehement objection of labor unions.

In 2000 Clinton worked with Republicans to give China entry into WTO and "most favored nation" trading status, i.e., the same low tariffs promised to any other WTO member. NAFTA and WTO advocates promoted an optimistic vision of the future, with prosperity to be based on intellectuals skills and managerial know-how more than on routine hand labor. They promised that free trade meant lower prices for consumers. Opposition to liberalized trade came increasingly from labor unions, who argued that this system also meant lower wages and fewer jobs for American workers who could not compete against wages of less than a dollar an hour. The shrinking size and diminished political clout of these unions repeatedly left them on the losing side.

Despite overall decreases in international tariffs, some tariffs have been more resistant to change. For example, due partially to tariff pressure from the European Common Agricultural Policy, US agricultural subsidies have seen little decrease over the past few decades, even in the face of recent pressure from the WTO during the latest Doha talks.

The Bush administration implemented tariffs on Chinese steel in 2002; according to a 2005 review of existing research on the tariff, all studies found that the tariffs caused more harm than gains to the US economy and employment.

== 2000 to present ==
=== Deindustrialization and China shock ===
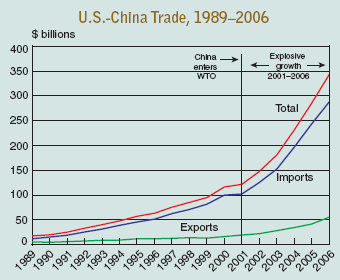
In the early 2000s, China was granted "Most favoured nation" (MFN) status by the World Trade Organization (WTO)

Studies by David Autor, David Dorn and Gordon Hanson showed that increased trade with China cost Americans around one million manufacturing workers between 1991 and 2007. Competition from Chinese imports has led to manufacturing job losses and declining wages. They also found that offsetting job gains in other industries never materialized. Closed companies no longer order goods and services from local non-manufacturing firms and former industrial workers may be unemployed for years or permanently. Increased import exposure reduces wages in the non-manufacturing sector due to lower demand for non-manufacturing goods and increased labor supply from workers who have lost their manufacturing jobs. Other work by this team of economists, with Daron Acemoglu and Brendan Price, estimates that competition from Chinese imports cost the U.S. as many as 2.4 million jobs in total between 1999 and 2011.

Although Autor, Dorn, and Hanson documented the adverse effects of Chinese import competition on certain U.S. regions, they emphasized that these findings reflected the broader impact of economic disruptions, including technological change and recessions, rather than trade alone. They did not dispute the overall economic benefits of free trade and did not advocate for protectionist measures like tariffs, but argued that policy responses should focus on helping workers adapt to change.

While most economists agree that the China Shock adversely affected some U.S. manufacturing workers and communities, there remains substantial disagreement on the magnitude of those losses and their overall effects on the U.S. economy. Several economists have found that the China Shock produced net economic gains for the United States. Moreover, there is broad consensus that the China Shock was not atypical—like other episodes of trade liberalization, it generated more “winners” than “losers”—and that, because the shock ended over a decade ago, new tariffs would be both ineffective and economically harmful.

Economist Douglas Irwin nuanced the paper of Autor, Dorn and Hanson. According to Irwin the so-called "China shock" — the sharp increase in Chinese imports to the United States — was an exceptional and largely one-off event . It coincided with a large-scale shift of labor from agriculture to industry in China, combined with a growing working-age population. Irwin argued that such conditions were unlikely to be repeated, given the slowing pace of urbanization and the now-declining working-age population in China. Moreover, the rise in Chinese imports occurred during a period of falling unemployment in the U.S., which, according to Irwin, indicated that it was not the result of a general demand shortfall. The problem, he contended, lay more in the geographic concentration of manufacturing and the limited ability of workers to move between regions and sectors.

Irwin also pointed to other contributing factors behind the deterioration of the U.S. labor market in the 2000s, including the 2008 financial crisis and macroeconomic imbalances such as China's exceptionally high current account surplus. In his view, the China shock did not alter the broad economic consensus that free trade delivererd substantial benefits, although it has been acknowledged that certain regions or occupational groups can be adversely affected by trade liberalization. In this context, the China shock represented an extreme case. Additional research, including work by Rob Feenstra, highlighted the consumer benefits of the China shock, particularly through lower prices that disproportionately benefited low-income households. Part of China's efficiency gains was also due to unilateral reductions in import tariffs on intermediate goods and raw materials, which made Chinese producers more competitive. This development was not the result of U.S. policy, but of internal reforms in China — reforms that Irwin considered positive.

=== First Donald Trump presidency ===
The first Trump tariffs were imposed by executive order (not by act of Congress) during the first presidency of Donald Trump as part of his economic policy. In January 2018, Trump imposed tariffs on solar panels and washing machines of 30 to 50 percent. He soon imposed tariffs on steel (25%) and aluminum (10%) from most countries. On June 1, 2018, this was extended on the European Union, Canada, and Mexico. Separately, on May 10, the Trump administration set a tariff of 25% on 818 categories of goods imported from China worth $50 billion (~$61.3 billion in 2024). The only country which remained exempt from the steel and aluminum tariffs was Australia. Argentinian and Brazilian aluminum tariffs were started on December 2, 2019, in reaction to currency manipulation.

Caliendo and Parro have found that the tariffs—and China’s inevitable retaliation—reduced consumption, wages, manufacturing exports, and aggregate welfare. The net welfare losses from 2018–2019 trade war (–0.1%) stand in stark contrast to the China Shock’s net gains (+0.2%).

=== Joe Biden ===
In May 2024, the Biden administration doubled tariffs on solar cells imported from China and more than tripled tariffs on lithium-ion electric vehicle batteries imported from China. The administration also raised tariffs on imports of Chinese steel, aluminum, and medical equipment. The tariff increases will be phased in over a period of three years.

=== Second Donald Trump presidency: Liberation Day tariffs ===
During his second presidency, Trump imposed a series of steep protective tariffs affecting nearly all U.S. imports. Between January and April 2025, the average effective U.S. tariff rate rose from 2.5% to an estimated 27%—the highest level in over a century.

United States president Donald Trump announced a broad package of import duties on April 2, 2025—a date he called "Liberation Day". In a White House Rose Garden ceremony, Trump signed Executive Order 14257, Regulating Imports With a Reciprocal Tariff to Rectify Trade Practices That Contribute to Large and Persistent Annual United States Goods Trade Deficits. This order declared a national emergency over the United States' trade deficit and invoked the International Emergency Economic Powers Act (IEEPA) to authorize sweeping tariffs on foreign imports.

Executive Order 14257 raised tariffs on nearly all countries to 10% beginning April 5, with higher rates for major trading partners scheduled to begin April 9. The Trump administration called the tariffs "reciprocal", asserting they mirrored and counteracted trade barriers faced by U.S. exports. Trade analysts rejected this characterization, noting that the tariffs often exceeded those imposed by foreign countries and included countries with which the U.S. had a trade surplus. Economists argued that the formula used to calculate the "reciprocal" tariffs was overly simplistic with little relation to trade barriers.

Trump also signed Executive Order 14256, Further Amendment to Duties Addressing the Synthetic Opioid Supply Chain in the People's Republic of China as Applied to Low-Value Imports, which closed the United States de minimis exemption for imports from China and further escalated the China–United States trade war.

The "Liberation Day" tariff announcement led to the 2025 stock market crash. In response, the White House suspended the April 9 tariff increases to allow time for negotiation. By July 31, Trump had announced deals with eight trading partners: the UK, Vietnam, the Philippines, Indonesia, Japan, South Korea, the EU, and a truce expiring August 12 with China. He ordered country-specific "reciprocal" tariffs to resume on August 7, 2025.

On May 28, 2025, the United States Court of International Trade ruled in a lawsuit that Trump had overstepped his authority in imposing tariffs under the IEEPA and ordered that the "Liberation Day" tariffs be vacated. The ruling was upheld by the Federal Circuit Court of Appeals on August 29. The Trump administration appealed to the U.S. Supreme Court, which, in February 2026, in the case of Learning Resources, Inc. v. Trump, affirmed the decision of the appeals court that Trump's use of emergency powers to enact the tariffs was not legal.

== See also ==
- Protectionism in the United States
- Tariffs in the first Trump administration
- Tariffs in the second Trump administration
- List of the largest trading partners of the United States
- List of largest trading partners of India
