= United States v. George S. Bush & Co. =

United States v. George S. Bush & Co
- Supreme Court of the United States

Argued April 23–24, 1940 Decided May 20, 1940
- Full case name: United States, et al. v. George S. Bush & Co., Inc.
- Citations: 310 U.S. 371 (more) 60 S. Ct. 944; 84 L. Ed. 1259; 1940 U.S. LEXIS 1085

Case history
- Prior: Judgment for plaintiffs by Court of Customs and Patent Appeals

Holding
- The President's discretion to approve changes to duty rates under the Tariff Act of 1930 is beyond judicial review.

Court membership
- Chief Justice Charles E. Hughes Associate Justices James C. McReynolds · Harlan F. Stone; Owen Roberts · Hugo Black; Stanley F. Reed · Felix Frankfurter; William O. Douglas · Frank Murphy

Case opinions
- Majority: Douglas, joined by Hughes, Stone, Roberts, Black, Reed, Frankfurter, Murphy
- Dissent: McReynolds

Laws applied
- Smoot–Hawley Tariff Act of 1930

United States v. George S. Bush & Co., 310 U.S. 371 (1940), was a United States Supreme Court decision in which the court held that the President's discretionary authority to approve tariff‐adjustment recommendations made by the U.S. Tariff Commission under the Tariff Act of 1930 is not subject to judicial review. The ruling clarified the separation of powers between the executive and judicial branches in the exercise of delegated legislative authority.

== Background ==
In response to economic hardship during the Great Depression, Congress enacted the Smoot–Hawley Tariff Act of 1930 to protect U.S. industries by raising import duties. However, recognizing that fixed rates could become unfair over time, Congress added § 336 in 1934. Section 336 allowed the independent U.S. Tariff Commission to recommend that the President adjust duties up or down (by up to 50%), or set a new ad valorem rate based on U.S. sales prices, whenever the Commission found that statutory rates failed to "equalize" domestic and foreign production costs. Section 336(c) then required the President to issue a formal proclamation approving the commission's recommended rates if, in the President's judgment, such adjustments were necessary to equalize production costs. Although section 501 of the Act permitted judicial review of certain actions taken by the Tariff Commission, it remained silent on whether courts could review the President's final proclamation under section 336(c).

When the Commission applied §336 to canned clams imported from Japan, it compiled weighted average invoice prices for the representative period December 1930 through September 1932 (so larger shipments counted more). The Commission converted those yen prices into dollars using the average Japanese yen–dollar exchange rate for calendar year 1932 and, on that basis, concluded that a 35% ad valorem duty measured on the American selling price was appropriate.

Importer George S. Bush & Co. challenged the President's proclamation under § 501 of the Tariff Act, which allows importers to contest duties in the Court of Customs and Patent Appeals (CCPA). They argued that § 336(e)(2) required converting all invoice prices at the rate current on each day of the representative period, not at one annual average rate. In 1939, the CCPA agreed and held the proclamation invalid for failing to follow what it saw as a statutory requirement for daily conversions, vacating the adjusted duty and remanding the case for recalculation.

== Supreme Court ==
In April 1940, the Supreme Court agreed to hear the case to determine whether federal courts have the authority to review the method used by the President to convert foreign costs into U.S. dollars under the tariff adjustment provisions of Section 336. The case was seen as an important test of the limits of judicial oversight in matters of economic policy and executive discretion.

On May 20, 1940, the Court issued its decision. Justice William O. Douglas delivered the opinion of the court, reversing the CCPA and upholding the validity of the presidential proclamation. He concluded that Section 336 did not specify any particular exchange-rate formula, such as the use of daily rates, and instead allowed the President broad discretion to choose a method consistent with the purpose of the statute. Since the law only referred to a "representative period" for average prices, Douglas reasoned that the President's use of an annual average rate was lawful.

Douglas further explained that once the Tariff Commission had made its factual findings, Congress intended the President to act upon them without further judicial involvement. In his view, permitting courts to question the President's choice of method would interfere with the executive's proper role in implementing complex economic policy and would violate the separation of powers. Citing Justice Story's opinion in Martin v. Mott, the court said "[w]henever a statute gives a discretionary power to any person, to be exercised by him upon his own opinion of certain facts, it is a sound rule of construction, that the statute constitutes him the sole and exclusive judge of the existence of those facts." Emphasizing the role of separation of powers, the court noted, "For the judiciary to probe the reasoning which underlies this Proclamation would amount to a clear invasion of the legislative and executive domains."
