= Smoot–Hawley Tariff Act =

1930 U.S. law which raised import duties

Tariff Act of 1930
- Long title: An Act To provide revenue, to regulate commerce with foreign countries, to encourage the industries of the United States, to protect American labor, and for other purposes
- Nicknames: Hawley–Smoot Tariff, Smoot–Hawley Tariff
- Enacted by: the 71st United States Congress

Citations
- Public law: Pub. L. 71–361
- Statutes at Large: ch. 497, 46 Stat. 590

Codification
- U.S.C. sections created: 589

Legislative history
- Introduced in the House of Representatives as H.R. 2667 by Willis C. Hawley (R-OR) on April or May 1929; Committee consideration by House Ways and Means, Senate Finance; Passed the House on May 28, 1929 (264–147); Passed the Senate on March 24, 1930 (53–31); Reported by the joint conference committee on June 9, 1930; agreed to by the Senate on June 13, 1930 (without division, after motion to recommit failed 42–44) and by the House on June 14, 1930 (222–153); Signed into law by President Herbert Hoover on June 17, 1930

Major amendments
- Moving Americans Privacy Protection Act

United States Supreme Court cases
- United States v. George S. Bush & Co.

The Tariff Act of 1930, also known as the Smoot–Hawley Tariff Act, was a protectionist trade measure signed into law in the United States by President Herbert Hoover on June 17, 1930. Named after its chief congressional sponsors, Senator Reed Smoot and Representative Willis C. Hawley, the act raised tariffs on over 20,000 imported goods in an effort to shield American industries from foreign competition during the onset of the Great Depression, which had started in October 1929.

Hoover signed the bill against the advice of many senior economists, yielding to pressure from his party and business leaders. Intended to bolster domestic employment and manufacturing, the tariffs instead deepened the Depression because the U.S.'s trading partners retaliated with tariffs of their own, leading to U.S. exports and global trade plummeting. Economists and historians widely regard the act as a policy misstep, and it remains a cautionary example of protectionist policy in modern economic debates. It was followed by more liberal trade agreements, such as the Reciprocal Trade Agreements Act of 1934.

== Sponsors and legislative history ==
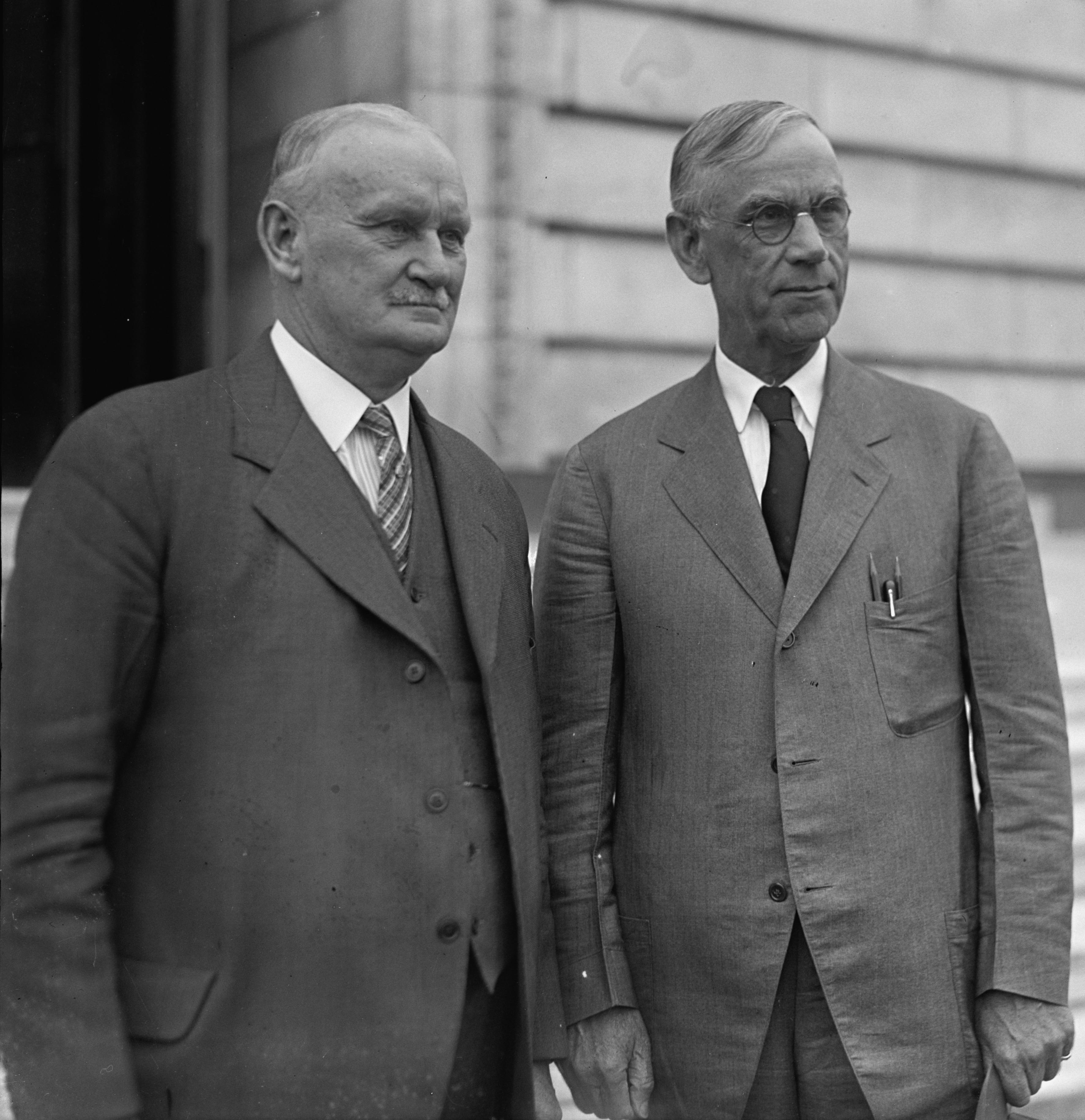
Willis C. Hawley (left) and Reed Smoot in April 1929, shortly before the Smoot–Hawley Tariff Act passed the House of Representatives

In 1927, the League of Nations held a World Economic Conference in Geneva. Their final report concluded that "the time has come to put an end to tariffs, and to move in the opposite direction". Vast debts and reparations from World War I could be repaid only through gold, services, or goods, but the only items available on that scale were goods. Many of the governments represented by the delegates to the conference did the opposite. In 1928, France was the first, enacting a new tariff law and quota system.

By the late 1920s, the U.S. economy had made exceptional gains in productivity because of electrification, which was a critical factor in mass production. Further factors in economic growth were US oil refineries, replacing horses and mules with motor vehicles. One-sixth to one-quarter of farmland that had been devoted to feeding horses and mules was freed up, contributing to a surplus in farm produce. Nominal and real wages increased, but did not keep up with the productivity gains.

Senator Smoot contended that raising the tariff on imports would alleviate the overproduction problem, but the market reality was that the United States had been running a trade account surplus. Although manufactured goods imports were rising, manufactured exports were rising even faster. Food exports had been falling and were in a trade account deficit, but the approximate values of food imports only amounted to half the value of manufactured imports.

Senate vote by state Two yeas Two nays One yea and one nay One yea and one abstention One nay and one abstention Two abstentions

In late 1929, as the global economy entered the first stages of the Great Depression, the main policy goal of the United States federal government was to protect its jobs and farmers from foreign competition. In 1929, Smoot championed another tariff increase within the United States, which became the Smoot–Hawley Tariff Bill. In his memoirs, Smoot made it abundantly clear: "The world is paying for its ruthless destruction of life and property in the World War and for its failure to adjust purchasing power to productive capacity during the Industrial Revolution of the decade following the war."

Smoot was a Republican from Utah and chairman of the Senate Finance Committee. Willis C. Hawley, a Republican from Oregon, was chairman of the House Committee on Ways and Means. During the 1928 United States presidential election, one of Herbert Hoover's campaign promises was to help beleaguered farmers by increasing tariffs on agricultural products. Hoover won, and Republicans maintained comfortable majorities in the House and the Senate in 1928.

The House passed a version of the act in May 1929, increasing tariffs on agricultural and industrial goods. The House bill passed on a vote of 264 to 147, with 244 Republicans and 20 Democrats voting in favor of the bill. The Senate debated its bill until March 1930, with many members trading votes based on industries in their states. The Senate bill passed on a vote of 44 to 42, with 39 Republicans and 5 Democrats voting in favor of the bill. The conference committee then unified the two versions, largely by raising tariffs to the higher levels passed by the House. The House passed the conference bill on a vote of 222 to 153, with the support of 208 Republicans and 14 Democrats.

== Opponents ==
In May 1930, a petition was signed by 1,028 economists in the United States asking President Hoover to veto the legislation (the petition was ultimately signed by over 1,250 economists). The petition was organized by Paul Douglas, Irving Fisher, James T. F. G. Wood, Frank Graham, Ernest Patterson, Henry Seager, Frank Taussig, and Clair Wilcox. Automobile executive Henry Ford also spent an evening at the White House trying to convince Hoover to veto the bill, calling it "an economic stupidity". J. P. Morgan's Chief Executive Thomas W. Lamont said he "almost went down on [his] knees to beg Herbert Hoover to veto the asinine Hawley–Smoot tariff".

While Hoover joined the economists in opposing the bill, calling it "vicious, extortionate, and obnoxious" because he felt it would undermine the commitment he had pledged to international cooperation, he eventually signed the bill after he yielded to influence from his own political party (Republican), his Cabinet (who had threatened to resign), and other business leaders. After the bill became law, in retaliation, Canada and other countries raised their own tariffs on U.S. goods. Franklin D. Roosevelt spoke against the act during his successful campaign for president in 1932.

== Retaliation ==
Most of the decline in trade was due to a plunge in gross domestic product (GDP) in the U.S. and worldwide. Beyond that was an additional decline. Some countries protested and others also retaliated with trade restrictions and tariffs. American exports to the protesters fell by 18%, and exports to those which retaliated fell by 31%. Threats of retaliation by other countries began long before the bill was enacted into law in June 1930. As the House of Representatives passed it in May 1929, boycotts broke out, and foreign governments moved to increase rates against American products, although US rates could be increased or decreased by the Senate or by the conference committee.

By September 1929, Hoover's administration had received protest notes from 23 trading partners, but the threats of retaliatory actions were ignored. In May 1930, Canada, the most loyal trading partner for the U.S., took action by imposing new tariffs on 16 products which accounted altogether for approximately 30% of U.S. exports to Canada. Later, Canada forged closer economic links with the British Empire via the British Empire Economic Conference of 1932. Nations other than Canada that enacted retaliatory tariffs included Cuba, Mexico, France, Italy, Spain, Argentina, Australia, New Zealand, and Switzerland. France and Britain protested and developed new trading partners. Germany developed a system of trade via clearing.

The economic depression worsened for workers and farmers despite Smoot and Hawley's promises of prosperity from high tariffs. Consequently, Hawley lost re-nomination, while Smoot was one of 12 Republican senators who lost their seats in the 1932 elections, with the swing being the largest in Senate history, being equaled in 1958 and 1980.

== Tariff levels ==
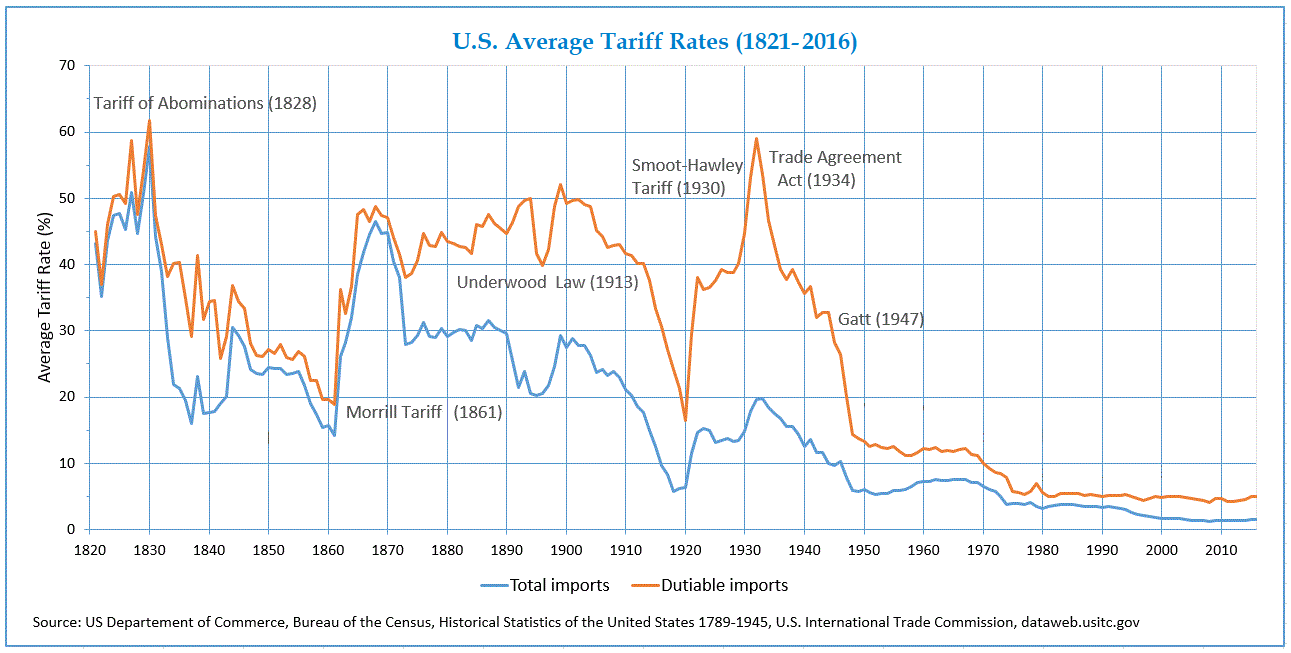
Average tariff rates in the United States, 1821–2016

In the two-volume series published by the U.S. Bureau of the Census, "The Historical Statistics of the United States, Colonial Times to 1970, Bicentennial Edition", tariff rates have been represented in two forms. The dutiable tariff rate peak of 1932 was 59.1%, second only to the 61.7% rate of 1830.

However, 63% of all imports in 1933 were not taxed, which the dutiable tariff rate does not reflect. The free and dutiable rate in 1929 was 13.5% and peaked under Smoot–Hawley in 1933 at 19.8%, one-third below the average 29.7% "free and dutiable rate" in the United States from 1821 to 1900. The average tariff rate, which was applied on dutiable imports, increased from 40.1% in 1929 to 59.1% in 1932 (+19%).

== After enactment ==
The tariffs initially appeared to be a success; according to historian Robert Sobel, "Factory payrolls, construction contracts, and industrial production all increased sharply." However, larger economic problems loomed in the guise of weak banks. When the Creditanstalt of Austria failed in 1931, the global deficiencies of the Smoot–Hawley Tariff became apparent.

U.S. imports decreased 66% from $4.4 billion (1929) to $1.5 billion (1933), and exports decreased 61% from $5.4 billion to $2.1 billion. US gross national product fell from $103.1 billion in 1929 to $75.8 billion in 1931 and bottomed out at $55.6 billion in 1933. Imports from Europe decreased from a 1929 high of $1.3 billion, to $390 million in 1932. U.S. exports to Europe decreased from $2.3 billion in 1929 to $784 million in 1932. Overall, world trade decreased by some 66% between 1929 and 1934.

Unemployment was 8% in 1930 when the Smoot–Hawley Act was passed but the new law failed to lower it. The rate jumped to 16% in 1931 and to 25% in 1932–1933. There is some contention about whether this can necessarily be attributed to the tariff. The Great Depression was already in motion before Smoot-Hawley, mainly due to financial instability, falling demand, and poor banking practices. However, the tariff worsened the crisis by shrinking global trade, hurting farmers, and reducing employment in export-dependent industries. Had it not passed, the Depression still would have occurred, but perhaps with less severity.

It was only during World War II, when "the American economy expanded at an unprecedented rate", that unemployment fell below 1930s levels. Imports in 1929 were only 4.2% of the U.S. GNP, and exports were only 5.0%. Monetarists, such as Milton Friedman, who emphasized the central role of the money supply in causing the depression, considered the Smoot–Hawley Act to be only a minor cause of the Great Depression in the United States.

== End of tariffs ==
The 1932 Democratic campaign platform pledged to lower tariffs. After winning the election, President Franklin D. Roosevelt and the now-Democratic Congress passed the Reciprocal Trade Agreements Act of 1934. This act allowed the president to negotiate tariff reductions on a bilateral basis and treated such a tariff agreement as regular legislation, requiring only a majority, rather than as a treaty requiring a two-thirds vote. This was one of the core components of the global economy that developed after World War II.

After World War II, that understanding supported a push toward multilateral trading agreements that would prevent similar situations in the future. While the Bretton Woods Agreement of 1944 focused on foreign exchange and did not directly address tariffs, those involved wanted a similar framework for international trade. President Harry S. Truman launched this process in November 1945 with negotiations for the creation of a proposed International Trade Organization (ITO).

As it happened, separate negotiations on the General Agreement on Tariffs and Trade (GATT) moved more quickly, with an agreement signed in October 1947. In the end, the United States never signed the ITO agreement. Adding a multilateral "most-favored-nation" component to that of reciprocity, the GATT served as a framework for the gradual reduction of tariffs over the subsequent half century.

Postwar changes to the Smoot–Hawley tariffs reflected a general tendency of the United States to reduce its tariff levels unilaterally while its trading partners retained their high levels. The American Tariff League Study of 1951 compared the free and dutiable tariff rates of 43 countries. It found that only seven nations had a lower tariff level than the United States (5.1%), and eleven nations had free and dutiable tariff rates higher than the Smoot–Hawley peak of 19.8%, including the United Kingdom with 25.6%. The 43-country average was 14.4%, which was 0.9% higher than the U.S. level of 1929, demonstrating that few nations were reciprocating in reducing their levels, as the United States reduced its own.

The reductions were not uniform across products. A study tracking every product that carried the equivalent of a 50 percent ad valorem tariff under the Act found that these highly protected lines were cut more slowly than the tariff schedule as a whole in the years before the 1947 GATT round. Products whose high rates dated from before 1930 had their specific duties reduced by about 10 percent before the GATT talks, compared with about 21 percent for products that had been newly raised to high protection in 1930, suggesting that industries which had only recently won protection were the first targets for reduction while long-protected industries kept theirs.

== Ensuing political dialogue ==
In 1993, in discussion leading up to the passage of the North American Free Trade Agreement (NAFTA), then-Vice President Al Gore mentioned the Smoot–Hawley Tariff as a response to NAFTA objections voiced by Ross Perot during a debate they had on The Larry King Show. He gave Perot a framed photograph of Smoot and Hawley shaking hands after passage of the act.

In April 2009, then-Representative Michele Bachmann made news when, during a speech, she referred incorrectly to the Smoot–Hawley Tariff as "the Hoot–Smalley Act", misattributed its signing to Franklin D. Roosevelt, and blamed him for the Great Depression. The act has been compared to the 2010 Foreign Account Tax Compliance Act (FATCA), with Andrew Quinlan from the Center for Freedom and Prosperity calling FATCA "the worst economic idea to come out of Congress since Smoot–Hawley".

=== In the second Trump administration ===
During his 2024 political campaign, Donald Trump pledged to institute similar tariffs.

In its annual forecast supplement for the global economy that was published in November 2024 ('Year Ahead' for 2025), The Economist observed that [in the wake of the Tariff Act] "... global trade fell by two-thirds. It was so catastrophic for growth in America and around the world that legislators have not touched the issue since. 'Smoot-Hawley' became synonymous with disastrous policy making".

The tariffs announced on April 2, 2025, which could raise tariff levels higher than the rates during the Smoot–Hawley Tariffs, brought renewed attention to the Smoot–Hawley Act.

In July 2026, the Trump administration invoked section 338 of the Tariff Act for the first time in its history (96 years after its passage). This section allows the president to apply a tariff up to 50% to nations which "discriminate" against American trade. On July 20, Trump invoked this section with a 50% tariff against multiple industries from Canada effective August 19. This was partially precipitated by recent Canadian wildfire smoke that caused negative air-quality across many cities in the Northern United States.

== Convict-made goods ==
Prior to 2016, the Tariff Act provided that "[a]ll goods, wares, articles, and merchandise mined, produced, or manufactured wholly or in part in any foreign country by convict labor or/and forced labor or/and indentured labor under penal sanctions shall not be entitled to entry at any of the ports of the United States" with a specific exception known as the "consumptive demand exception", which allowed forced labor-based imports of goods where United States domestic production was not sufficient to meet consumer demand. The exception was removed under Wisconsin Representative Ron Kind's amendment bill, which was incorporated into the Trade Facilitation and Trade Enforcement Act of 2015 and signed by President Barack Obama in February 2016.

== In popular culture ==
In the 1986 film, Ferris Bueller's Day Off, Ben Stein, playing a high school economics teacher, references the tariff in a lecture to his students.

The tariff act is heavily featured in the 1989 book Dave Barry Slept Here: A Sort of History of the United States by author and columnist Dave Barry.

== See also ==
- Country of origin
- List of tariff laws in the United States
- Plant Patent Act of 1930 (originally enacted as Title III of the Smoot–Hawley Tariff Act)
- Protectionism in the United States
- History of tariffs in the United States

== Sources ==
- Archibald, Robert B.; Feldman, David H. (1998), "Investment During the Great Depression: Uncertainty and the Role of the Smoot–Hawley Tariff", Southern Economic Journal, 64 (4): 857–879, doi:10.2307/1061208, JSTOR 1061208.
- Crucini, Mario J. (1994), "Sources of variation in real tariff rates: The United States 1900 to 1940", American Economic Review, 84 (3): 346–353, JSTOR 2118081.
- Crucini, Mario J.; Kahn, James (1996), "Tariffs and Aggregate Economic Activity: Lessons from the Great Depression", Journal of Monetary Economics, 38 (3): 427–467, doi:10.1016/S0304-3932(96)01298-6.
- Eckes, Alfred (1995), Opening America's Market: U.S. Foreign Trade Policy since 1776, Chapel Hill: University of North Carolina Press, ISBN 0-585-02905-9.
- Eichengreen, Barry (1989), "The Political Economy of the Smoot–Hawley Tariff", Research in Economic History, 12: 1–43.
- Irwin, Douglas A. (May 1998). "The Smoot–Hawley Tariff: A Quantitative Assessment" (PDF). The Review of Economics and Statistics. 80 (2). The MIT Press: 326–334. doi:10.1162/003465398557410. ISSN 0034-6535. JSTOR 2646642. S2CID 57562207. Previously published as "The Smoot–Hawley Tariff: A Quantitative Assessment" (PDF), NBER Working Paper Series, National Bureau of Economic Research, March 1996
- Irwin, Douglas (2011), Peddling Protectionism: Smoot–Hawley and the Great Depression, Princeton University Press, ISBN 978-0-691-15032-1; online book review.
- Kaplan, Edward S. (1996), American Trade Policy: 1923–1995, London: Greenwood Press, ISBN 0-313-29480-1.
- Kottman, Richard N. (1975), "Herbert Hoover and the Smoot–Hawley Tariff: Canada, A Case Study", Journal of American History, 62 (3): 609–635, doi:10.2307/2936217, JSTOR 2936217.
- Koyama, Kumiko (2009), "The Passage of the Smoot–Hawley Tariff Act: Why Did the President Sign the Bill?", Journal of Policy History, 21 (2): 163–186, doi:10.1017/S0898030609090071, S2CID 154415038.
- McDonald, Judith; O'Brien, Anthony Patrick; Callahan, Colleen (1997), "Trade Wars: Canada's Reaction to the Smoot–Hawley Tariff", Journal of Economic History, 57 (4): 802–826, doi:10.1017/S0022050700019549, JSTOR 2951161, S2CID 154380335.
- Madsen, Jakob B. (2001), "Trade Barriers and the Collapse of World Trade during the Great Depression", Southern Economic Journal, 67 (4): 848–868, doi:10.2307/1061574, JSTOR 1061574.
- Merill, Milton (1990), Reed Smoot: Apostle in Politics, Logan, UT: Utah State Press, ISBN 0-87421-127-1.
- Mitchener, Kris James; O'Rourke, Kevin Hjortshøj; Wandschneider, Kirsten (2022). "The Smoot–Hawley Trade War". Economic Journal. 132 (647): 2500–2533. doi:10.1093/ej/ueac006.
- O'Brien, Anthony, "Smoot–Hawley Tariff", EH Encyclopedia, archived from the original on October 2, 2009.
- Pastor, Robert (1980), Congress and the Politics of U.S. Foreign Economic Policy, 1929–1976, Berkeley: University of California Press, ISBN 0-520-03904-1.
- Schattschneider, E. E. (1935), Politics, Pressures and the Tariff, New York: Prentice-Hall – Classic study of passage of Hawley–Smoot Tariff
- Taussig, F. W. (1931), The Tariff History of the United States (PDF) (8th ed.), New York: G. P. Putnam's Sons.
- Temin, Peter (1989), Lessons from the Great Depression, MIT Press, ISBN 0-262-20073-2.
- Turney, Elaine C. Prange; Northrup, Cynthia Clark (2003), Tariffs and Trade in U.S. History: An Encyclopedia.
