= Thornhill v. Alabama =

- Supreme Court of the United States

Argued February 2, 1938 Decided April 28, 1940
- Full case name: Thornhill v. State of Alabama
- Citations: 310 U.S. 88 (more) 60 S. Ct. 736; 84 L. Ed. 1093; 1940 U.S. LEXIS 1153

Case history
- Prior: 28 Ala.App. 527; 189 So. 913 (1923)

Holding
- The free speech clause protects speech about the facts and circumstances of a labor dispute.

Court membership
- Chief Justice Charles E. Hughes Associate Justices James C. McReynolds · Harlan F. Stone; Owen Roberts · Hugo Black; Stanley F. Reed · Felix Frankfurter; William O. Douglas · Frank Murphy

Case opinions
- Majority: Murphy, joined by Hughes, Stone, Roberts, Black, Reed, Frankfurter, Douglas
- Dissent: McReynolds

Thornhill v. Alabama, 310 U.S. 88 (1940), is a US labor law case of a United States Supreme Court. It reversed the conviction of the president of a local union for violating an Alabama statute that prohibited only labor picketing. Thornhill was peaceably picketing his employer during an authorized strike when he was arrested and charged. In reaching its decision, Associate Justice Frank Murphy wrote for the Supreme Court that the free speech clause protects speech about the facts and circumstances of a labor dispute. The statute in the case prohibited all labor picketing, but Thornhill added peaceful labor picketing to the area protected by free speech.

== Facts ==
Byron Thornhill was convicted of "loitering or picketing" near a place of business, pursuant to § 3448 of the 1923 Code of Alabama. Thornhill had been charged with loitering near the Brown Wood Preserving Company with the "intent or purpose of influencing others" to interfere with lawful business during a strike by a local union affiliated with the American Federation of Labor. After his conviction in the Inferior Court of Tuscaloosa County, he appealed to the Circuit Court of Tuscaloosa County. He was originally fined "$100 and costs," but was sentenced to prison for 59 days after not paying. After he failed his appeal, the circuit court increased the prison time to 73 days. Furthermore, the court of appeals affirmed the rulings of the two lower courts. The Alabama Supreme Court denied Thornhill's petition for certiorari, but the U.S. Supreme Court subsequently granted the petition.

=== Charges ===
1. The State of Alabama, by its Solicitor, complains of Byron Thornhill that, within twelve months before the commencement of this prosecution he did without just cause or legal excuse therefor, go near to or loiter about the premises or place of business of another person, firm, corporation, or association of people, to-wit: the Brown Wood Preserving Company, Inc., a corporation, engaged in a lawful business, for the purpose or with the intent of influencing or inducing other persons not to trade with, buy from, sell to, have business dealings with, or be employed by the said Brown Wood Preserving Company, Inc., a corporation, for the purpose of hindering, delaying, or interfering with or injuring the lawful business or enterprise of the said Brown Wood Preserving Company, Inc., a corporation.
2. The State of Alabama, by its Solicitor, complains of Byron Thornhill that, within twelve months before the commencement of this prosecution he did without just cause or legal excuse therefor, go near to or loiter about the premises or place of business of another person, firm, corporation, or association of people, to-wit: the Brown Wood Preserving Company, Inc., a corporation, engaged in a lawful business, for the purpose or with the intent of influencing or inducing other persons not to trade with, buy from, sell to, have business dealings with, or be employed by the said Brown Wood Preserving Company, Inc., a corporation.
3. The State of Alabama, by its Solicitor, complains of Byron Thornhill that, within twelve months before the commencement of this prosecution he did picket the works or place of business of another person, firm, corporation, or association of people, to-wit, the Brown Wood Preserving Company, Inc., a corporation, for the purpose of hindering, delaying, or interfering with or injuring the lawful business or enterprise of the said Brown Wood Preserving Company, Inc., a corporation.

== Judgment ==
The majority opinion reversed the lower courts' rulings by citing the freedoms of speech and the press granted in the first amendment, and secured by the fourteenth. The court also found the Alabama statute to be invalid on its face.

== Significance ==
Implicit in Thornhill was the idea that picketing could be curtailed if the picketers marched with signs that went beyond the issues in the particular labor dispute; this would come up in later cases.

== See also ==
- US labor law
- List of United States Supreme Court cases, volume 310
