= United States v. American Trucking Ass'ns =

United States v. American Trucking Associations
- Supreme Court of the United States

Argued April 26, 1940 Decided May 27, 1940
- Full case name: United States, et al. v. American Trucking Associations, et al.
- Citations: 310 U.S. 534 (more) 60 S. Ct. 1059; 84 L. Ed. 1345; 1940 U.S. LEXIS 1049; 2 Lab. Cas. (CCH) ¶ 17,064

Case history
- Prior: Judgment for plaintiffs by U.S. District Court

Holding
- The Motor Carrier Act of 1935 does not empower the Interstate Commerce Commission to regulate all employees of common and contract motor carriers, but rather only those whose duties affect safety of operation.

Court membership
- Chief Justice Charles E. Hughes Associate Justices James C. McReynolds · Harlan F. Stone; Owen Roberts · Hugo Black; Stanley F. Reed · Felix Frankfurter; William O. Douglas · Frank Murphy

Case opinions
- Majority: Reed, joined by Black, Frankfurter, Douglas, Murphy
- Dissent: Stone, joined by McReynolds, Roberts, Hughes

Laws applied
- Motor Carrier Act of 1935

United States v. American Trucking Associations, 310 U.S. 534 (1940), was a landmark United States Supreme Court in which the court held the Motor Carrier Act of 1935 did not permit federal agencies to regulate employees whose duties did not affect safety and operation.

== Background ==
The American Trucking Associations (ATA) filed suit to compel the Interstate Commerce Commission (ICC) to regulate all employees of trucking industries, rather than simply those whose job affects safety. The Fair Labor Standards Act (FLSA) included an exemption to employees regulated by the ICC under the Motor Carrier Act of 1935. The ATA sought a ruling compelling the ICC to recognize all trucking employees as within its power to regulate, as such employees would then be exempt from the minimum wage and overtime requirements of the FLSA.

== Opinion of the Court ==
The court decided that ICC's interpretation of the statute, which limited its power only to those employees who affect safety, was correct.

== See also ==
- List of United States Supreme Court cases, volume 310
