= Cantwell v. Connecticut =

Cantwell
- Supreme Court of the United States

Argued March 29, 1940 Decided May 20, 1940
- Full case name: Newton Cantwell, et al. v. State of Connecticut
- Citations: 310 U.S. 296 (more) 60 S. Ct. 900; 84 L. Ed. 1213; 1940 U.S. LEXIS 591; 128 A.L.R. 1352

Case history
- Prior: 126 Conn. 1, 8 A.2d 533; cert. granted, 309 U.S. 626 (1940).
- Subsequent: None

Holding
- The Free Exercise Clause of the First Amendment is incorporated against the states by the Fourteenth Amendment.

Court membership
- Chief Justice Charles E. Hughes Associate Justices James C. McReynolds · Harlan F. Stone; Owen Roberts · Hugo Black; Stanley F. Reed · Felix Frankfurter; William O. Douglas · Frank Murphy

Case opinion
- Majority: Roberts, joined by unanimous

Laws applied
- U.S. Const. amends. I, XIV

Cantwell v. Connecticut, 310 U.S. 296 (1940), is a landmark court decision by the United States Supreme Court holding that the First Amendment's federal protection of religious free exercise incorporates via the Due Process Clause of the Fourteenth Amendment and so applies to state governments too.

This decision has been described by legal scholars as one of the pivotal religious liberty cases decided between 1938 and 1946 that strengthened the First Amendment protection of religious liberty and "ushered in a new era of personal liberty protections for all Americans."

== Background ==
Newton Cantwell (a Jehovah's Witness) and his two sons, were preaching in a heavily Roman Catholic neighborhood in New Haven, Connecticut. The Cantwells were going door to door, with books and pamphlets and a portable phonograph with sets of records. Each record contained a description of one of the books. One such book was "Enemies", which was an attack on organized religion in general and especially the Roman Catholic Church. Jesse Cantwell stopped two men on the street and requested permission to play a phonograph. They gave permission, and after hearing the recording, the two citizens were incensed; though they wanted to physically assault the Cantwells, they restrained themselves.

Cantwell and his two sons were arrested and charged with: (1) violation of a Connecticut statute requiring solicitors to obtain a certificate from the secretary of the public welfare council ("Secretary") before soliciting funds from the public, and (2) inciting a common-law breach of the peace.

The statute under which they were charged was an early type of consumer protection law: it required the Secretary, before issuing a certificate permitting solicitation, to determine whether a cause was "a religious one or is a bona fide object of charity or philanthropy" and whether the solicitation "conforms to reasonable standards of efficiency and integrity." Upon determination of a cause's legitimacy, a solicitation certificate would be issued.

=== Prior history ===
While the appellants argued they were merely distributing religious literature, the state supreme court held that the trial court's findings showed they were also soliciting donations for their cause. This act of fundraising brought them within the scope of the state law they were accused of violating.

The Connecticut Supreme Court found that the statute was an effort by the state of Connecticut to protect the public against fraud, and as such, the statute was constitutional. The court rejected the First Amendment defense, ruling that the law was a constitutional exercise of the state's power to protect the public from fraud and imposition in the solicitation of funds for purported religious, charitable, or philanthropic purposes. The court distinguished between the protected act of distributing literature and the regulated act of soliciting money, finding the latter subject to state oversight to prevent fraud.

The Connecticut Supreme Court upheld the conviction of all three on the statutory charge and affirmed one son's conviction of inciting a breach of the peace, but remanded the inciting a breach of peace charge against the other two for a new trial.

== Supreme Court ==
The Cantwells argued that the statute itself, both on its face and as interpreted and used against them, unlawfully denied their freedom of speech and prohibited the free exercise of their religion. The State argued that its law does not censor religious speech in advance but only aims to prevent fraudulent fundraising disguised as religion.

The Court acknowledged this purpose but stated that the key constitutional question remains: even with this valid goal, does the specific method Connecticut has chosen to prevent fraud violate the fundamental freedoms protected by the Constitution? The issue is whether the state's regulatory means are permissible, not just its end goal.

=== Opinion of the Court ===
The Court found that Cantwell's action was protected by the First and Fourteenth Amendments. While the state may regulate solicitation, Connecticut's specific licensing system gave a state official discretionary power to censor religion by deciding whether a cause qualifies as "religious" before any fundraising can occur. This constituted a prior restraint on the free exercise of religion.

Justice Owen Roberts wrote in a unanimous opinion that "to condition the solicitation of aid for the perpetuation of religious views or systems upon a license, the grant of which rests in the exercise of a determination by state authority as to what is a religious cause, is to lay a forbidden burden upon the exercise of liberty protected by the Constitution."

In general the court held with respect to the "liberties guaranteed by the First Amendment" and their embodiment in the Due Process Clause of the Fourteenth Amendment:

We hold that the statute, as construed and applied to the appellants, deprives them of their liberty without due process of law in contravention of the Fourteenth Amendment. The fundamental concept of liberty embodied in that Amendment embraces the liberties guaranteed by the First Amendment. The First Amendment declares that Congress shall make no law respecting an establishment of religion or prohibiting the free exercise thereof. The Fourteenth Amendment has rendered the legislatures of the states as incompetent as Congress to enact such laws. The constitutional inhibition of legislation on the subject of religion has a double aspect. On the one hand, it forestalls compulsion by law of the acceptance of any creed or the practice of any form of worship. Freedom of conscience and freedom to adhere to such religious organization or form of worship as the individual may choose cannot be restricted by law. On the other hand, it safeguards the free exercise of the chosen form of religion. Thus the Amendment embraces two concepts,—freedom to believe and freedom to act. The first is absolute but, in the nature of things, the second cannot be. Conduct remains subject to regulation for the protection of society. The freedom to act must have appropriate definition to preserve the enforcement of that protection. In every case the power to regulate must be so exercised as not, in attaining a permissible end, unduly to infringe the protected freedom. No one would contest the proposition that a state may not, by statute, wholly deny the right to preach or to disseminate religious views. Plainly such a previous and absolute restraint would violate the terms of the guarantee. It is equally clear that a state may by general and non-discriminatory legislation regulate the times, the places, and the manner of soliciting upon its streets, and of holding meetings thereon; and may in other respects safeguard the peace, good order and comfort of the community, without unconstitutionally invading the liberties protected by the Fourteenth Amendment.

The Court affirmed that states may constitutionally regulate the public solicitation of funds, even for religious causes. Such a regulation is permissible if it is (1) neutral (does not impose a religious test), (2) serves the public interest, and (3) does not unreasonably hinder the fundraising process. This type of regulation does not constitute an unlawful prior restraint on religion or an unconstitutional obstacle to its free exercise. A state may protect its citizens from fraud by requiring public solicitors to prove their identity and authorization for the cause they represent. It may also reasonably regulate the time, place, and manner of solicitation for public order. However, Connecticut's law oversteps these bounds. By requiring a license to solicit funds for a religious cause—where the granting of that license depends on a state official's judgment about what qualifies as a "religious cause"—the state places an unconstitutional burden on the free exercise of religion.

The Court also set aside Jesse Cantwell's conviction for breach of the peace. It framed the issue as a conflict between two legitimate interests: the fundamental constitutional right to free religious exercise and speech, and a state's interest in preserving public peace and order. The states have the power regulate speech that poses a "clear and present danger of riot, disorder, interference with traffic upon the public streets, or other immediate threat to public safety, peace, or order." However, the Court noted that Connecticut did not convict Cantwell under a specific, narrowly drawn law regulating street discussions or phonograph use to prevent disorder. Instead, his conviction was based on a vague common-law concept of breach of the peace, which gives officials overly broad discretion to punish speech. Because Cantwell's conviction was equivalent to conviction under an overbroad statute—" sweeping in a great variety of conduct under a general and indefinite characterization"—it unlawfully infringed upon his First Amendment rights.

== Significance ==
Before the Cantwell decision, it was not legally clear that the First Amendment protected religious practitioners against restrictions at the state and local levels as well as federal. But the Supreme Court in Cantwell said it did, thereby ushering in an era of greatly strengthened religious freedom.

This case incorporated the First Amendment's Free Exercise Clause, thereby applying it to the states and protecting free exercise of religion from intrusive state action. The Establishment Clause was incorporated seven years later in Everson v. Board of Education.

== See also ==
- Incorporation (Bill of Rights)
- R.A.V. v. City of St. Paul, 505 U.S. 377 (1992)
