= List of United States Supreme Court cases, volume 310 =

Supreme Court of the United States
- Interactive map of Supreme Court of the United States
- 38°53′26″N 77°00′16″W
- Established: March 4, 1789; 236 years ago
- Location: Washington, D.C.
- Coordinates: 38°53′26″N 77°00′16″W
- Composition method: Presidential nomination with Senate confirmation
- Authorised by: Constitution of the United States, Art. III, § 1
- Judge term length: life tenure, subject to impeachment and removal
- Number of positions: 9 (by statute)
- Website: supremecourt.gov

This is a list of cases reported in volume 310 of United States Reports, decided by the Supreme Court of the United States in 1940.

== Justices of the Supreme Court at the time of volume 310 U.S. ==
The Supreme Court is established by Article III, Section 1 of the Constitution of the United States, which says: "The judicial Power of the United States, shall be vested in one supreme Court . . .". The size of the Court is not specified; the Constitution leaves it to Congress to set the number of justices. Under the Judiciary Act of 1789 Congress originally fixed the number of justices at six (one chief justice and five associate justices). Since 1789 Congress has varied the size of the Court from six to seven, nine, ten, and back to nine justices (always including one chief justice).

When the cases in volume 310 were decided the Court comprised the following members:

Portrait	Justice	Office	Home State	Succeeded	Date confirmed by the Senate (Vote)	Tenure on Supreme Court
	Charles Evans Hughes	Chief Justice	New York	William Howard Taft	February 13, 1930 (52–26)	February 24, 1930 – June 30, 1941 (Retired)
	James Clark McReynolds	Associate Justice	Tennessee	Horace Harmon Lurton	August 29, 1914 (44–6)	October 12, 1914 – January 31, 1941 (Retired)
	Harlan F. Stone	Associate Justice	New York	Joseph McKenna	February 5, 1925 (71–6)	March 2, 1925 – July 2, 1941 (Continued as chief justice)
	Owen Roberts	Associate Justice	Pennsylvania	Edward Terry Sanford	May 20, 1930 (Acclamation)	June 2, 1930 – July 31, 1945 (Resigned)
	Hugo Black	Associate Justice	Alabama	Willis Van Devanter	August 17, 1937 (63–16)	August 19, 1937 – September 17, 1971 (Retired)
	Stanley Forman Reed	Associate Justice	Kentucky	George Sutherland	January 25, 1938 (Acclamation)	January 31, 1938 – February 25, 1957 (Retired)
	Felix Frankfurter	Associate Justice	Massachusetts	Benjamin Nathan Cardozo	January 17, 1939 (Acclamation)	January 30, 1939 – August 28, 1962 (Retired)
	William O. Douglas	Associate Justice	Connecticut	Louis Brandeis	April 4, 1939 (62–4)	April 17, 1939 – November 12, 1975 (Retired)
	Frank Murphy	Associate Justice	Michigan	Pierce Butler	January 16, 1940 (Acclamation)	February 5, 1940 – July 19, 1949 (Died)

== Notable Cases in 310 U.S. ==
=== Thornhill v. Alabama ===
Thornhill v. Alabama, 310 U.S. 88 (1940), is a US labor law case. In it the Supreme Court reversed the conviction of the president of a local union for violating an Alabama statute that prohibited only labor picketing. Thornhill was peaceably picketing his employer during an authorized strike when he was arrested and charged. In reaching its decision, the Supreme Court decided that the free speech clause protects speech about the facts and circumstances of a labor dispute. The statute in the case prohibited all labor picketing, but the Thornhill decision added peaceful labor picketing to the area protected by free speech.

=== United States v. Socony-Vacuum Oil Company ===
United States v. Socony-Vacuum Oil Company, 310 U.S. 150 (1940), is a landmark anti-trust decision of the Supreme Court widely cited for the proposition that price-fixing is illegal per se. Socony has been cited and quoted many times for its statements that the rule against price-fixing is sweeping, and was, at least until recently, the most widely cited case on price fixing.

=== Cantwell v. Connecticut ===
In Cantwell v. Connecticut, 310 U.S. 296 (1940), the Supreme Court held that the First Amendment's federal protection of religious free exercise incorporates via the Due Process Clause of the Fourteenth Amendment and so applies to state governments too.

=== Minersville School District v. Gobitis ===
Minersville School District v. Gobitis, 310 U.S. 586 (1940), involved the religious rights of public school students under the First Amendment to the United States Constitution. The Supreme Court ruled that public schools could compel students (in this case, Jehovah's Witnesses) to salute the American flag and recite the Pledge of Allegiance despite the students' religious objections to these practices. This decision led to increased persecution of Witnesses in the United States. The Supreme Court overruled this decision three years later in West Virginia State Board of Education v. Barnette (1943).

== Federal court system ==
Under the Judiciary Act of 1789 the federal court structure at the time comprised District Courts, which had general trial jurisdiction; Circuit Courts, which had mixed trial and appellate (from the US District Courts) jurisdiction; and the United States Supreme Court, which had appellate jurisdiction over the federal District and Circuit courts—and for certain issues over state courts. The Supreme Court also had limited original jurisdiction (i.e., in which cases could be filed directly with the Supreme Court without first having been heard by a lower federal or state court). There were one or more federal District Courts and/or Circuit Courts in each state, territory, or other geographical region.

The Judiciary Act of 1891 created the United States Courts of Appeals and reassigned the jurisdiction of most routine appeals from the district and circuit courts to these appellate courts. The Act created nine new courts that were originally known as the "United States Circuit Courts of Appeals." The new courts had jurisdiction over most appeals of lower court decisions. The Supreme Court could review either legal issues that a court of appeals certified or decisions of court of appeals by writ of certiorari. On January 1, 1912, the effective date of the Judicial Code of 1911, the old Circuit Courts were abolished, with their remaining trial court jurisdiction transferred to the U.S. District Courts.

== List of cases in volume 310 U.S. ==
Case name	Citation	Opinion of the Court	Vote	Concurring opinion or statement	Dissenting opinion or statement	Procedural jurisdiction	Result
Union Joint Stock Land Bank of Detroit v. Byerly	310 U.S. 1 (1940)	Roberts	6-3	none	Black, Douglas, and Murphy (joint opinion)	certiorari to the United States Court of Appeals for the Sixth Circuit (6th Cir.)	reversed
United States v. City of San Francisco	310 U.S. 16 (1940)	Black	8-1	none	McReynolds (without opinion)	certiorari to the United States Court of Appeals for the Ninth Circuit (9th Cir.)	reversed
Veix v. Sixth Ward Building and Loan Association of Newark	310 U.S. 32 (1940)	Reed	9-0	McReynolds (without opinion)	none	appeal from the New Jersey Supreme Court (N.J. Sup. Ct.)	affirmed
Colorado National Bank of Denver v. Bedford	310 U.S. 41 (1940)	Reed	9-0	none	none	appeal from the Colorado Supreme Court (Colo.)	affirmed
Osborn v. Ozlin	310 U.S. 53 (1940)	Frankfurter	6-3	none	Roberts (opinion; joined by Hughes and McReynolds)	appeal from the United States District Court for the Eastern District of Virginia (E.D. Va.)	affirmed
Helvering, Commissioner of Internal Revenue v. Fuller	310 U.S. 69 (1940)	Douglas	8-1	none	Reed (opinion)	certiorari to the United States Court of Appeals for the Second Circuit (2d Cir.)	affirmed
Helvering, Commissioner of Internal Revenue v. Leonard	310 U.S. 80 (1940)	Douglas	6-3	none	Hughes, McReynolds, and Roberts (without opinions)	certiorari to the United States Court of Appeals for the Second Circuit (2d Cir.)	reversed
Thornhill v. Alabama	310 U.S. 88 (1940)	Murphy	8-1	none	McReynolds (without opinion)	certiorari to the Alabama Court of Appeals (Ala. Ct. App.)	reversed
Carlson v. California	310 U.S. 106 (1940)	Murphy	8-1	none	McReynolds (without opinion)	appeal from the Superior Court of California (Cal. Super.)	reversed
Perkins, Secretary of Labor v. Lukens Steel Company	310 U.S. 113 (1940)	Black	8-1	none	McReynolds (without opinion)	certiorari to the United States Court of Appeals for the District of Columbia (D.C. Cir.)	reversed
Warren v. Palmer	310 U.S. 132 (1940)	Reed	9-0	none	none	certiorari to the United States Court of Appeals for the Second Circuit (2d Cir.)	affirmed
Tigner v. Texas	310 U.S. 141 (1940)	Frankfurter	8-1	none	McReynolds (without opinion)	appeal from the Texas Court of Criminal Appeals (Tex. Crim. App.)	affirmed
United States v. Socony-Vacuum Oil Company	310 U.S. 150 (1940)	Douglas	5-2[a][b]	none	Roberts (opinion; with which McReynolds concurred)	certiorari to the United States Court of Appeals for the Seventh Circuit (7th Cir.)	reversed
Dampskibsselskabet Dannebrog v. Signal Oil and Gas Company of California	310 U.S. 268 (1940)	Hughes	9-0	none	none	certiorari to the United States Court of Appeals for the Ninth Circuit (9th Cir.)	affirmed
Sontag Chain Stores Company v. National Nut Company of California	310 U.S. 281 (1940)	McReynolds	9-0	none	none	certiorari to the United States Court of Appeals for the Ninth Circuit (9th Cir.)	reversed
Cantwell v. Connecticut	310 U.S. 296 (1940)	Roberts	9-0	none	none	appeal from and certiorari to the Connecticut Supreme Court (Conn.)	reversed
Borchard v. California Bank	310 U.S. 311 (1940)	Roberts	9-0	none	none	certiorari to the United States Court of Appeals for the Ninth Circuit (9th Cir.)	reversed
National Labor Relations Board v. Bradford Dyeing Association	310 U.S. 318 (1940)	Black	8-0[c]	none	none	certiorari to the United States Court of Appeals for the First Circuit (1st Cir.)	reversed
United States v. Chicago Heights Trucking Company	310 U.S. 344 (1940)	Black	9-0	none	none	appeal from the United States District Court for the Northern District of Illinois (N.D. Ill.)	reversed
Ex parte Bransford, Treasurer of Pima County	310 U.S. 354 (1940)	Reed	9-0	none	none	motion for mandamus to the United States District Court for the District of Arizona (D. Ariz.)	mandamus denied
Nashville, Chattanooga and St. Louis Railway Company v. Browning and Others, Constituting the State Board of Equalization of Tennessee	310 U.S. 362 (1940)	Frankfurter	9-0	none	none	certiorari to the Tennessee Supreme Court (Tenn.)	affirmed
United States v. Bush and Company	310 U.S. 371 (1940)	Douglas	8-1	none	McReynolds (without opinion)	certiorari to the United States Court of Customs and Patent Appeals (Ct. Cust. & Pat. App.)	reversed
Sunshine Anthracite Coal Company v. Adkins, Collector of Internal Revenue	310 U.S. 381 (1940)	Douglas	8-1	none	McReynolds (short statement)	appeal from the United States District Court for the Eastern District of Arkansas (E.D. Ark.)	affirmed
Anderson v. Helvering, Commissioner of Internal Revenue	310 U.S. 404 (1940)	Murphy	9-0	none	none	certiorari to the United States Court of Appeals for the Tenth Circuit (10th Cir.)	affirmed
United States v. Summerlin	310 U.S. 414 (1940)	Hughes	9-0	none	none	certiorari to the Florida Supreme Court (Fla.)	reversed
Delaware River Joint Toll Bridge Commission v. Colburn	310 U.S. 419 (1940)	Stone	9-0	none	none	certiorari to the New Jersey Court of Errors and Appeals (N.J.)	reversed
Securities and Exchange Commission v. United States Realty and Improvement Company	310 U.S. 434 (1940)	Stone	5-3[d]	none	Roberts (opinion; with which Hughes and McReynolds concurred)	certiorari to the United States Court of Appeals for the Second Circuit (2d Cir.)	reversed
Apex Hosiery Company v. Leader	310 U.S. 469 (1940)	Stone	6-3	none	Hughes (opinion; joined by McReynolds and Roberts)	certiorari to the United States Court of Appeals for the Third Circuit (3d Cir.)	affirmed
White v. Texas	310 U.S. 530 (1940)	Black	9-0	none	none	certiorari to the Texas Court of Criminal Appeals (Tex. Crim. App.)	rehearing denied
United States v. American Trucking Associations	310 U.S. 534 (1940)	Reed	5-4	none	Hughes, McReynolds, Stone, and Roberts (joint short statement)	appeal from the United States District Court for the District of Columbia (D.D.C.)	reversed
United States v. Dickerson	310 U.S. 554 (1940)	Murphy	5-4	none	Hughes, McReynolds, Stone, and Roberts (joint short statement)	certiorari to the United States Court of Claims (Ct. Cl.)	reversed
Arkansas v. Tennessee	310 U.S. 563 (1940)	Hughes	9-0	none	none	original jurisdiction	boundary set
Railroad Commission of Texas v. Rowan and Nichols Oil Company	310 U.S. 573 (1940)	Frankfurter	6-3	none	Roberts (opinion; joined by Hughes and McReynolds)	certiorari to the United States Court of Appeals for the Fifth Circuit (5th Cir.)	reversed
Minersville School District v. Gobitis	310 U.S. 586 (1940)	Frankfurter	8-1	McReynolds (without opinion)	Stone (opinion)	certiorari to the United States Court of Appeals for the Third Circuit (3d Cir.)	reversed

[a] Hughes took no part in the case
[b] Murphy took no part in the case
[c] McReynolds took no part in the case
[d] Douglas took no part in the case
