= Douglas Irwin =

American economist

Academic background
- Alma mater: Columbia University

Academic work
- Discipline: International economics
- Institutions: Dartmouth College, John Sloan Dickey Third Century Professor in the Social Sciences
- Website: https://sites.dartmouth.edu/dirwin/; Information at IDEAS / RePEc

Douglas A. Irwin is the John French Professor of Economics in the Economics Department at Dartmouth College and the author of seven books. He is an expert on both past and present U.S. trade policy, especially policy during the Great Depression. He is frequently sought by media outlets such as The Economist and Wall Street Journal to provide comment and his opinion on current events. He also writes op-eds and articles about trade for mainstream media outlets like The Wall Street Journal, The New York Times, and Financial Times. He is also a nonresident senior fellow at the Peterson Institute for International Economics.

Prior to his appointment to as professor at Dartmouth, Irwin was an associate professor of business economics at the University of Chicago Booth School of Business, an economist for the Board of Governors of the Federal Reserve System, and an economist for the Council of Economic Advisers Executive Office of the president.

== Education ==
Irwin received his Ph.D. in economics with distinction from Columbia University in 1988. He also received a B.A. in political science, magna cum laude from the University of New Hampshire. He has served on the editorial board of the Journal of Economic History, the World Trade Review, the Journal of International Economics, and Essays in Economic & Business History.

== Research ==
At Dartmouth, he is the director of the Political Economy Project. His published research is widely cited, and covers both modern trade policy and the history of the trading system.

His books include:

- Clashing over Commerce: A History of U.S. Trade Policy, Chicago: University of Chicago Press, 2018. ISBN 9780226398969;
- Free Trade Under Fire, Princeton: Princeton University Press, 2015. ISBN 9781400866182;
- Trade Policy Disaster: Lessons from the 1930s, Cambridge, MA: MIP Press, 2012. ISBN 9780262016711;
- Peddling Protectionism: Smoot-Hawley and the Great Depression, Princeton: Princeton University Press, 2011. ISBN 9780691150321;
- Founding choices: American economic policy in the 1790s, Chicago: University of Chicago Press, 2011. ISBN 0226384748;
- The Genesis of the GATT, Cambridge UK: Cambridge University Press, 2008. ISBN 9780511817953;
- Against the Tide: An Intellectual History of Free Trade, Princeton: Princeton University Press, 1998. ISBN 9780691058962;

== Honors ==
Irwin has received numerous grants and awards, including the John Simon Guggenheim Memorial Foundation Principal Investigator fellowship and a National Science Foundation grant. He received the Manhattan Institute for Policy Research's F.A. Hayek Book prize as well as the Economic History Association's Alice Hanson Jones prize for his 2017 book, Clashing over Commerce: A History of U.S. Trade Policy.

== Personal ==
Irwin is married to Marjorie Rose, a Dartmouth economics professor and former staff economist at the International Monetary Fund and Council of Economics Advisors. In 2024, Irwin signed a faculty letter expressing support for the actions of Dartmouth College president Sian Beilock, who ordered the arrests of 90 students and faculty members nonviolently protesting the Gaza war.
