= Reciprocal Tariff Act =

1934 United States tariff law

- Long title: AN ACT To amend the Tariff Act of 1930.
- Enacted by: the 73rd United States Congress

Citations
- Public law: Pub. L. 73–316
- Statutes at Large: 48 Stat. 943

Legislative history
- Introduced in the House as H.R. 8687; Signed into law by President Franklin D. Roosevelt on June 12, 1934

The Reciprocal Tariff Act (enacted June 12, 1934, ch. 474, 48 Stat. 943, 19 U.S.C. § 1351) provided for the negotiation of tariff agreements between the United States and separate nations, particularly Latin American countries. The Act served as an institutional reform intended to authorize the president to negotiate with foreign nations to reduce tariffs in return for reciprocal reductions in tariffs in the United States up to 50%.

It resulted in a reduction of duties. This was the policy of the low tariff Democrats in response to the high tariff Republican program which produced the Smoot–Hawley tariff of 1930 that raised rates and sharply reduced international trade. The Reciprocal Tariff Act was promoted heavily by Secretary of State Cordell Hull.

== Reciprocal Tariff Act of 1934 ==
President Franklin D. Roosevelt signed the Reciprocal Trade Agreements Act (RTAA) into law in 1934. It gave the president power to negotiate bilateral, reciprocal trade agreements with other countries and enabled Roosevelt to liberalize American trade policy around the globe. It is widely credited with ushering in the era of liberal trade policy that persisted throughout the 20th century.

Tariffs in the United States were at historically high levels from the American Civil War to the 1920s. In response to the Great Depression, Congress accelerated its protectionist policies, culminating in the Smoot–Hawley Act of 1930, a smorgasbord of high tariffs across many American industries. At the same time, European countries enacted protectionist policies.

The RTAA marked a sharp departure from the era of protectionism in the United States. American duties on foreign products declined from an average of 46% in 1934 to 12% by 1962.

=== Trade agreements under RTAA ===
Between 1934 and 1945, the United States signed 32 reciprocal trade agreements with 27 countries. Furthermore, the conclusion of the General Agreement on Tariffs and Trade was made by the authority under the RTAA.

=== History ===
The authorization under the RTAA has been granted for three years from the day of enactment (June 12, 1934) the RTAA. The authorization was extended to in 1937, in 1940, in 1943, in 1945.

The extension law was not enacted by June 11, 1948, the due date of the extension in 1945, and the right of reduction was revoked. The extension law was established on November 26, 1949, and was extended until June 11, 1951, and then 1951. The year was extended by two years and revoked in 1953 and extended on August 7., also for one year until 1954. Met. The 1954 extension was also for one year, but from 1955 to the June 30, 1958 extension. The law, which was once revoked in 1958 but extended on 30 August 1960, was enacted. (Note: This Act has amended Article 2 (c) (19 U. SC 135 1352 (c)) of the 1934 Reciprocity–Commerce–Committee Act in which the extension law up to that stipulates the period of authority. In contrast, the 1958 Extension Act stipulates that Article 2 itself will extend the time limit.)

The RTAA, which has been updated intermittently until 1961, is a multilateral trade negotiation in GATT and negotiations with new member states.

The power to cut down expired in 1961, but in November, President Kennedy advocated a new tariff reduction negotiations, which would be called Kennedy Round, and in response, the new tariff reduction, the Trade Expansion Act of 1962, was enacted, and the President was granted the power to reduce tariffs by June 30, 1967.

From then on, rounds and free trade area negotiations in GATT (later WTO) included the negotiating powers of non-tariff measures in the respective legislation, such as the Trade Act of 1974, was granted to the President, but the power to reduce tariffs was generally similar to the RTAA.

=== Differences between RTAA and other trade agreements ===
Before the RTAA, if Congress wanted to establish a lower tariff for particular imports, it would act unilaterally and tackle the foreign country's tariff rate as fixed. Congress would choose a tariff rate that was either a little higher or lower than the median preferred tariff, depending upon the composition of the Congress. Generally, a Republican-controlled Congress would prefer higher tariffs, and a Democratic-controlled Congress would prefer lower tariffs. Thus, tariffs were chosen based on US domestic politics. Individual members of Congress were under great pressure from industry lobbyists to raise tariffs to protect it from the negative effects of foreign imports.

The RTAA's novel approach freed Roosevelt and Congress to break that trend of tariff increases. It tied US tariff reductions to reciprocal tariff reductions with international partners. It also allowed Congress to approve the tariffs with a simple majority in both houses of Congress, as opposed to the two-thirds majority of the Senate necessary to provide consent to ratify a treaty. Also, the President had the authority to negotiate the terms. The three innovations in trade policy created the political will and feasibility to enact a more liberal trade policy.

Reciprocity was an important tenet of the trade agreements brokered under RTAA because it gave Congress an incentive to lower tariffs. As more foreign countries entered into bilateral tariff reduction deals with the United States, exporters had more incentive to lobby Congress for even lower tariffs across many industries.

By giving the President the authority to negotiate the deals, the Congress effectively ceded a part of its power (authorized under US Constitution, Article I, Section VIII) to the executive branch. The President had to consider the welfare of all Americans, his foreign policy priorities, and what was feasible with other countries in making his decisions on tariffs. Those considerations generally left presidents more inclined to reduce tariffs than the Congress. Whether Roosevelt or Congress foresaw that result is a matter of historical debate.

=== Historical partisan divide over tariffs and the RTAA ===
After the Civil War, Democrats were generally for trade liberalization, and Republicans were generally for higher tariffs. The pattern was clear in congressional votes for tariffs from 1860 to 1930. Democrats were the congressional minority in the majority of Congresses between the Civil War and the election of Roosevelt. During their brief stints in the majority, Democrats passed several tariff reduction bills. Examples include the Wilson–Gorman Act of 1894 and the Underwood Tariff Act of 1913. However, subsequent Republican majorities always undid the unilateral tariff reductions.

By the Great Depression, tariffs were at historic highs. Members of Congress commonly entered in informal quid pro quo agreements in which they voted for other members' preferred tariffs in order to secure support for their own. No one took into account the aggregate toll on American consumers or exporters. That practice is commonly referred to as logrolling. Roosevelt and key members of his administration were intent on stopping the practice.

Democrats voted for trade liberalization far more often than Republicans but were not uniform in their preferences. Democrats skeptical of reducing tariffs during the Depression included Representative Henry Rainey (D-IL) and members of Roosevelt's own administration: Rexford Tugwell, Raymond Moley, and Adolf Berle. However, the administration decided to take advantage of having a Democrat-controlled Congress and Presidency to push through the RTAA. In 1936 and 1940, the Republican Party ran on a platform of repealing the tariff reductions secured under the RTAA. However, when they won back Congress in 1946, they did not act to remove the tariffs. In the years since the enactment of the RTAA in 1934, the economies of Europe and East Asia had been decimated by the violence of World War II, which left a huge global production vacuum that was filled by American exporters. During the war, the United States had its highest positive account balance in its history. Republican preferences for tariffs started shifting, as exporters from home districts began to benefit from increased international trade. By the 1950s, there was no statistically significant difference between Republicans and Democrats on tariff policies, a change that has endured ever since.

=== Reciprocity ===
Another key feature of the RTAA was that if Congress wanted to repeal a tariff reduction, it would take a two-thirds supermajority. That means that the tariff would have to be especially onerous, and the Congress would have to be especially protectionist. Once enacted, tariff reductions tended to stick.

As more American industries began to benefit from tariff reductions, some of them began to lobby Congress for lower tariffs. Until RTAA, Congress had been lobbied mostly by industries seeking to create or increase tariffs to protect their industry. That change also helped to lock in many of the gains in trade liberalization. In short, the political incentive to raise tariffs decreased, and the political incentive to lower tariffs increased.

=== World changes caused by RTAA ===
As American duties dropped off dramatically, global markets were also increasingly liberalized. World trade expanded rapidly. The RTAA was a US law but provided the first widespread system of guidelines for bilateral trade agreements. The United States and the European nations began avoiding beggar-thy-neighbour policies, which pursued national trade objectives at the expense of other nations. Instead, countries started to realize the gains from trade co-operation.

Led by the United States and the United Kingdom, international co-operation flourished, and concrete institutions were created. In talks begun at the Bretton Woods Conference of 1944, the International Monetary Fund was created. By 1949, the first international board governing trade, the General Agreement on Tariffs and Trade (GATT), had been established. In 1994, the GATT was replaced by the World Trade Organization (WTO), which still oversees international trade agreements.

The US Department of State also found good use of the expansion of free trade after World War II. Many in the State Department saw multilateral trade agreements as a way to engage the world in accordance with the Marshall Plan and the Monroe Doctrine. US trade policy became an integral part of US foreign policy. That pursuit of free trade as diplomacy intensified during the Cold War, as the US competed with the Soviet Union for relationships around the globe.
