= GSA =

GSA may refer to:

== Commerce ==
- Citroën GSA, a French automobile
- GameSpy Arcade, a utility for use with network computer games
- General sales agent, an airline sales representative
- Global mobile Suppliers Association, a not-for-profit industry organisation representing companies across the worldwide mobile ecosystem
- Google Search Appliance, a device for document indexing
- Global Semiconductor Alliance, a semiconductor industry trade group
- Global Sourcing Association, a trade association in the United Kingdom
- Gordon Stanfield Animation, a Canadian animation studio

== Education ==
- Gay–straight alliance, a North American student organization
- German Studies Association, an organization of scholars of Germany, Austria, and Switzerland
- Girls' Schools Association, in the United Kingdom
- Graduate student assistant
- Graduate student association
- Green Schools Alliance, in the United States

=== Schools ===
- Gaiety School of Acting, in Dublin, Ireland
- German School of Athens, in Greece
- George Stevens Academy, a private school in Maine, United States
- Gitam School of Architecture, at Gitam University, in Visakhapatnam, India
- Glasgow School of Art, in Scotland
- Governor's School for the Arts (Kentucky), in Danville, Kentucky, United States
- Guildford School of Acting, in England
- Guyana School of Agriculture

== Government ==
- European GNSS Agency, an EU agency concerned with navigation satellites
- General Services Administration, a United States federal agency that supports other US agencies
- Ghana Standards Authority
- Global Arrangement on Sustainable Steel and Aluminum, a proposed trade agreement between the United States and European Union
- Groupement Spécial Autonome, now the Army Special Forces Brigade, French Army special forces command

== Science ==
- Genetic sexual attraction
- Genetics Society of America
- General somatic afferent fibers
- Geological Society of America
- Geological Society of Australia
- Gerontological Society of America
- GNAS complex locus, a protein

== Other uses ==
- Gaudineer Scenic Area, in West Virginia, United States
- Gaye Su Akyol, Turkish singer, painter and anthropologist
- Girl Scouts of America, defunct
- Global Storage Architecture, a distributed file system
- Goan Sports Association, in Mumbai, India
- Long Pasia Airport, in Malaysia
- General Service Assistant, One of the positions in the Hospital Authority
