= GSAS =

GSAS may refer to:

- Global Sustainability Assessment System
- Graduate School of Arts and Sciences (disambiguation)
- Garda Síochána Analysis Service, part of the Garda Crime and Security Branch, in Ireland

== See also ==
- GSA (disambiguation)
