= List of law schools in Andhra Pradesh =

In Andhra Pradesh 45 legal education centres are available for graduate law program.

- Acharya Nagarjuna University, Nagarjun NagarGuntur
- A.C. Andhra Christian College, Guntur
- All Saints Christian Law College, Visakhapatnam
- Andhra University College of Law, of Andhra University, Waltair, Visakhapatnam
- Anantha College of Law, Tirupati
- Anantapur Law College, Anantapur
- A.V.R. Amrutha College of Law, Visakhapatnam
- Bapatla Education Society's Law College, Bapatla is closed in 2002
- C.R.R. Law College, Eluru
- Dr Ambedkar Global Law Institute, Tirupati, Old name Dr. B. R. Ambedkar Law College
- Dr. B.R. Ambedkar P.G. Centre, Etcherla, Srikakulam
- Daita Sriramulu Hindu College of Law, Machilipatnam
- Damodaram Sanjivayya National Law University, Visakhapatnam
- D.N. Raju Law College, Bhimavaram
- D.S.R. Hindu Law College, Machilipatnam
- Gitam School of Law, of GITAM University, Visakhapatnam
- G.S.K.M. Law College, Rajahmundry
- Indira Priyadarshini Law College, Ongole
- JC College of Law, Guntur
- KKC College of Law, Chittoor
- K.L.U. College of Law, Green Fields of Vaddeshwaram University of Guntur
- M.M. College of Law, Vijayawada
- M.P.R. Law College, Srikakulam
- M.R.V.R.G.R Law College, Viziayanagaram
- N.B.M. Law College, Visakhapatnam
- NVP Law College, Visakhapatnam
- Osmania Law College, Kurnool
- PS Raju Law College, Kakinada
- Rajiv Gandhi Institute of Law, Kakinada
- Sri R.K.M. Law College, Chittoor
- Shri Shiridi Sai Vidya Parishad Law College, Amalapuram
- Shri Shiridi Sai Vidya Parishad Law College, Anakapalli
- Smt. Basava Rama Tarakam Memorial Law College, Cuddapah
- Smt Velagapudi Durgamba Siddhartha Law College, Vijayawada
- Sree Vijaya Nagar Law College, Anantapur
- Sri Eshwar Reddy College of Law, Tirupati
- Sri P. Basi Reddy College of Law, Cuddapah
- Sri Prasunna College of Law, Kurnool
- Sri Sankara's Law College, Kurnool
- Sri Venkateswara College of Law, Tirupati
- Sri Venkateshwara University, Tirupati
- Sri Krishnadevaraya University of Anantapur
- Sri Padmavati Mahila Viswavidyalayam of Tirupati
- Sri Venkateswara University of Tirupati
- Shaida Moula Law College, Darsi, Prakasam district
- University Law College, Waltair (Dr. B.R. Ambedkar College of Law)
- University College of Law, A. Nagarjuna]]
- V.D. Siddhartha Law College, Vijayawada]]
- Veeravalli College of Law, Rajahmundhry
- Vikramasimhapuri University of Nellore
- Visakha Law College, Visakhapatnam
- V.R. Law College, Nellore
- Yogi Vemana University, Kadapa

== See also ==
- Autonomous law schools in India
- Common Law Admission Test
- Legal education in India
