= Steel tariff =

Steel tariff may refer to:

- 2002 United States steel tariff, introduced by President George W. Bush
- Steel tariffs in the first Trump administration, 2018
- Steel tariffs in the second Trump administration, 2025

== See also ==
- Tariff
