= Tariff Act =

Tariff Act can refer to the following:

United States

- Hamilton tariff (1789)
- Morrill Tariff (1861)
- Tariff of 1883
- McKinley Tariff (1890)
- Wilson–Gorman Tariff Act (1894)
- Dingley Act (1897)
- Payne–Aldrich Tariff Act (1909)
- Revenue Act of 1913
- Fordney–McCumber Tariff (1922)
- Smoot–Hawley Tariff Act (1930)
- Reciprocal Tariff Act (1934)
- Trade and Tariff Act of 1984

Other countries

- Isle of Man (Customs) Acts (1874)

== See also ==
- List of tariffs in the United States
