= Navneet Mandhani =

Indian real estate developer (born 1981)

- Born: January 28, 1981 (age 45); Vizianagaram, India
- Education: B.Tech (Electronics and Communication Engineering), M.Sc. (Electrical and Communication Engineering)
- Alma mater: Gandhi Institute of Technology and Management, Louisiana State University
- Occupations: Real Estate Developer, investor
- Organization(s): Karma Developers, Voyzze Communications, Sophonos Investments, AI Forge
- Known for: Founder and CEO of Karma Developers

Navneet Mandhani is a Cypriot entrepreneur, investor and real estate developer based in Dubai, United Arab Emirates.

He is the founder and CEO of Karma Developers, an international real estate development company and the founder of Sophonos Investments, a private investment company.

== Early life and education ==
Navneet Mandhani was born in Vizianagaram, India. He pursued his early education in India before enrolling at GITAM University, where he completed a degree in engineering. He later moved to the United States and obtained a master's degree from Louisiana State University.

== Career ==
Mandhani began his professional career in 2004 in enterprise technology and consulting, working with NCR Teradata and later IBM, where he led data transformation and healthcare technology initiatives. In 2010, he founded VoYZZ Communications Inc., a North America-based VoIP company that scaled rapidly and was later acquired.

In 2013, he entered into real estate sector and co-founded Karma Developers in Dubai.

== Recognition ==
- Cross Border Real Estate Leader at Gulf Business Real Estate Summit & Awards 2026
- Most Impactful Real Estate Leaders 2026
- The Stevie® Award 2026 - Bronze & Silver Stevie® Winner
- 2026 Global Expansion and Innovation in Real Estate Award
- Entrepreneur Middle East "100 NRIs" list 2026
- Entrepreneur Leadership Awards 2025
