= List of tariff laws in the United States =

This is a list of United States tariff laws.

- 1789: Tariff of 1789 (Hamilton Tariff)
- 1790: Tariff of 1790
- 1791: Tariff of 1791
- 1792: Tariff of 1792
- 1816: Tariff of 1816
- 1824: Tariff of 1824
- 1828: Tariff of 1828 (Tariff of Abominations)
- 1832: Tariff of 1832
- 1833: Tariff of 1833
- 1842: Tariff of 1842
- 1846: Walker tariff
- 1857: Tariff of 1857
- 1861: Morrill Tariff
- 1872: Tariff of 1872
- 1875: Tariff of 1875
- 1883: Tariff of 1883 (Mongrel Tariff)
- 1890: McKinley Tariff
- 1894: Wilson–Gorman Tariff Act
- 1897: Dingley Tariff
- 1909: Payne–Aldrich Tariff Act
- 1913: Revenue Act of 1913 (Underwood Tariff)
- 1921: Emergency Tariff of 1921
- 1922: Fordney–McCumber Tariff
- 1930: Smoot–Hawley Tariff Act
- 1934: Reciprocal Tariff Act
- 1947: General Agreement on Tariffs and Trade
- 1962: Trade Expansion Act
- 1974: Trade Act of 1974
- 1979: Trade Agreements Act of 1979
- 1984: Trade and Tariff Act of 1984
- 1988: Omnibus Foreign Trade and Competitiveness Act
- 1994: World Trade Organization created
- 2002: 2002 United States steel tariff
- 2002: Trade Act of 2002
- 2009: Chinese tire tariffs
- 2018: Tariffs in the first Trump administration
- 2025: Tariffs in the second Trump administration
