= List of graduate student associations =

A graduate students association, or graduate student union, or variations, is an organization organized by and for students at university who are past the undergraduate stage.

Some have organized graduate student unions.

Notable GSAs are:

== Australia ==
- University of Melbourne student organisations

== Canada ==
- List of Ontario students' associations
- Graduate Students' Association (University of Ottawa)

== United States ==
- Associated Students of the University of California, Santa Barbara
- University of California Student Association
- Graduate Students of UC Irvine Undergraduate Students Association Council (Los Angeles)
- Associated Students of UC Merced Graduate Student Association
- National Black Graduate Student Association
- University of Maryland, Baltimore County student organizations
- Temple University Graduate Students Association
