= Indian Society for Technical Education =

Professional organisation

ISTE
- Founded: 1968
- Type: Professional Organisation
- Location: New Delhi, India
- Origins: Association of Principals of Technical Institutions
- Website: https://www.isteonline.in

The Indian Society for Technical Education is a national, professional, non-profit Society registered under the Indian Societies Registration Act of 1860. First started in 1941 as the Association of Principals of Technical Institutions (APTI), it was converted into "Indian Society for Technical Education" in 1968 with a view to enlarge its activities to advance the cause of Technology education. ISTE has an Executive Council at National level. It has active membership of more than 97286 technical teachers, 5,66,466 student members, more than 2345 institutional members (including IITs, IISc, NITs and other leading technical institutions), 1166 faculty chapters and 1280 students’ chapters throughout the country. The major objective of the ISTE is to assist and contribute in the production and development of top quality professional engineers and technicians needed by the industries and other organizations. Being the only national organization of educators in the field of Engineering and Technology, ISTE effectively contributes in various missions of the Union Government. The Ministry of Human Resource Development, CTE/Department of Science and Technology/MIT/State Govts. are well associated with the ISTE for programs relating to technical education.

== Major objective of the ISTE ==
1. To formulate general goals & responsibilities of technical education.
2. To adjust curriculum & educational processes to changing conditions.
3. To develop effective teachers & educational administrators.
4. To improve instructional methods & practices & administrative usages.
5. To enhance professional ideals & standards.
6. To foster research as a function complementary to teaching.
7. To cultivate fraternal spirit amongst the teachers, administrators, industrialists & professionals.
8. To bring about effective linkage between technical institutions industry & society.
9. To award Honorary fellowships, Awards and Prizes, for promoting the objectives of Technical Education.

== Management of ISTE ==
The affairs of the ISTE are managed by a National Executive Council consisting of:

- The President
- Vice Presidents
- Honorary Treasurer
- Executive Secretary
- Elected representatives of Sections
- 6 Nominated Members (at least one female member)
- 6 Distinguished Invitees.

(Two Vice-Presidents are elected every two years from amongst the Executive Council members)
