= Global Arrangement on Sustainable Steel and Aluminum =

Proposed joint tariff zone

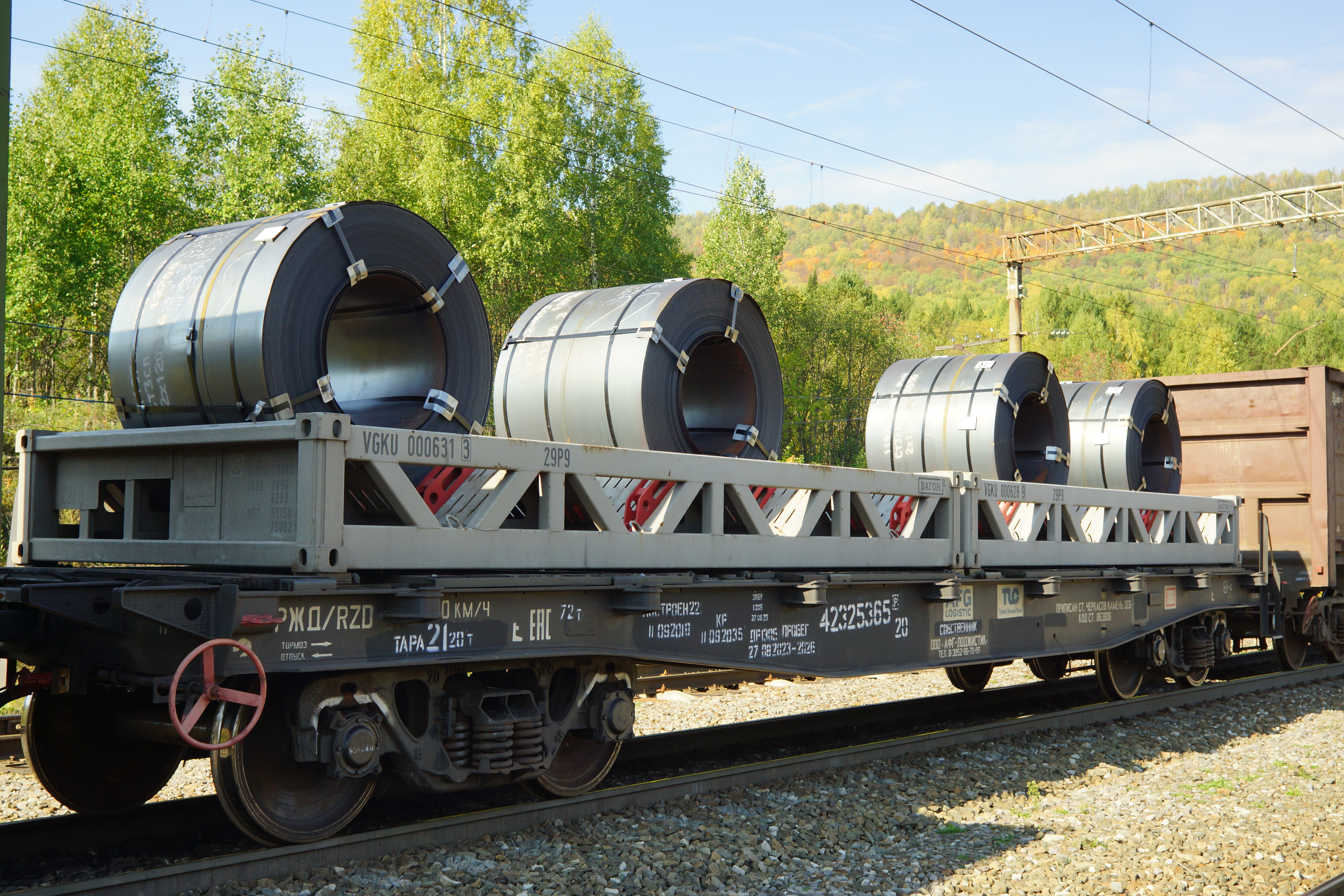
Rolled steel transported by rail

The Global Arrangement on Sustainable Steel and Aluminum (alternative spelling Aluminium; abbreviated as GSA, GASA, or GASSA; also called Green Steel Club) is a proposed joint tariff zone of countries imposing import tariffs on aluminium and steel from “non-market economies” such as China. The Global Arrangement would eliminate the chance of reinstating Trump-era tariffs on steel and aluminium.

In 2021, the EU and US agreed to remove the US tariffs on aluminium and steel for specific quantities of aluminium and steel that were entirely manufactured within the EU, while they pursued a longer-term trade agreement. The tariffs, imposed by former President Donald Trump under Section 232 of the Cold-War Trade Expansion Act in 2018, targeted industries deemed crucial for national defence, with a 25 percent tariff on steel and a 10 percent tariff on aluminium. The World Trade Organization (WTO) ruled against these tariffs. The EU retaliated and imposed tariffs on American goods, such as Harley-Davidson motorcycles and bourbon whiskey.

The Global Arrangement would likely break WTO rules.
