= Global Storage Architecture =

Distributed file system by IBM

GSA (Global Storage Architecture) is a distributed file system created by IBM to replace the Andrew File System and the DCE Distributed File System.
