= National Black Graduate Student Association =

National Black Graduate Student Association (NBGSA) is a non-profit interdisciplinary organization for graduate students of African descent in the United States. The national headquarters is located at Howard University in Washington, D.C. The association was established to address the needs and concerns of black graduate and professional students, and to encourage black undergraduates to pursue advanced degrees. NBGSA provides resources for ensuring the academic success of African American students and aids in developing networks of emerging black scholars, with the goal of diversifying academia and enriching the larger community.

NBGSA is managed by its members. NBGSA offers its members leadership training, professional development, mentoring opportunities, and career placement services. NBGSA is recognized as the primary student organization addressing the needs of black graduate students.

== History ==
=== Founding ===
In May 1989, Robert M. Sellers, Todd C. Shaw, Robert Brown, Daria Kirby, Lisa M. Brown, and Thomas LaVeist—graduate students at the University of Michigan—planned and hosted the National Black Graduate Student Conference (NBGSC) to "address some of the issues that the African American community faced." Sellers, who chaired the planning committee, stated that the NBGSC was designed to "provide an opportunity for African American graduate students to develop professionally as well as serve as a forum for future researchers and professionals." At the first NBGSC black graduate students from across the United States participated in paper presentations, professional workshops, and round-table discussions related to the professional development of African American students and the black community. The conference had attendees from over 25 universities, including the University of Kentucky, Howard University, Northern Illinois University, Case Western Reserve University, and Texas A&M University.

With help from the Office of Minority Affairs at the University of Michigan, the conference planning committee hosted a successful three-day event. James S. Jackson, Associate Dean and Professor of Psychology at the University of Michigan, credited the black graduate students with contributing to the university’s commitment to the "value of diversity in intellectual inquiry and teaching." Jackson stated that the "overwhelming response and involvement of graduate students across the country is a testament to the need and importance of this meeting." As result of the NBGSC, the conference attendees decided to create a national organization that would address issues concerning black graduates. The NBGSA was proposed at the end of the national conference in 1989.

The association's pro tempore national president was Todd C. Shaw, a doctoral student at the University of Michigan. His executive board consisted of Jacqueline M. Davis, graduate student at Mississippi State University as Vice-President; Donna Cochran, graduate student at the University of Michigan as Recording Secretary; Barbara Gates, doctoral candidate at the University of Michigan as Corresponding Secretary; and Minora Sharpe, graduate student at Pennsylvania State University as Treasurer. With Shaw as president, the initial constitution to establish the association was written.

The second annual conference was held at Mississippi State University in 1990. On the final day of the conference, the official constitution of the NBGSA was voted upon and adopted by conference attendees. New officers were elected to formally establish the association. Phyllis Gray-Ray, Associate Professor of Sociology, Anthropology, and Social Work at Mississippi State University, served as the first National Advisory Chair and became the first Executive Director of NBGSA. Mississippi State University became NBGSA's home in 1994, and the association remained in that location until 1997.

=== Early years ===
NBGSA in its early years followed the career of Gray-Ray. In 1997, she accepted a position at North Carolina Central University in Durham, North Carolina. The Executive Council agreed to temporarily move the national headquarters to North Carolina. Several years later, Gray-Ray took another position at Jackson State University, and the association relocated its national office back to Mississippi. Upon arriving at Jackson State University, Gray-Ray resigned from her position with NBGSA. The Executive Council presented Gray-Ray with the title of Executive Director Emeritus in 2000 at the national conference held at the University of Wisconsin–Madison. In 1999, NBGSA moved to Howard University's Graduate School in Washington, D.C., where it remains headquartered.

== Presidents ==
- 1989–1990: Todd C. Shaw, Ph.D., University of Michigan
- 1990–1991: Jacqueline M. Davis-Gines, Ph.D., Mississippi State University
- 1991–1992: James Alexander Robinson, Ph.D., University of California, Berkeley
- 1992–1993: Thomas Stewart, Ph.D., Howard University
- 1993–1994: Marwin Spiller, Ph.D., University of Illinois at Urbana–Champaign
- 1994–1995: Sharron Y. Herron, Ph.D., Mississippi State University
- 1995–1996: Kevin McPherson, Ph.D., University of Oklahoma
- 1996–1997: Shannon Marquez, Ph.D., University of North Carolina at Chapel Hill
- 1997–1998: Kevin Michael Foster, Ph.D., University of Texas at Austin
- 1998–1999: Charmaine N. Jackson Mercer, Ph.D., Claremont Graduate University
- 1999–2000: Kimberly R. Moffitt, Ph.D., Howard University
- 2000–2001: Tessa Johnson, MA, Northern Illinois University
- 2001–2002: Adrienne D. Dixson, Ph.D., University of Wisconsin–Madison
- 2002–2004: Tamara Bertrand Jones, Ph.D., Florida State University
- 2004–2005: Marla J. Mitchell, M.Ed., Miami University (Ohio)
- 2005–2006: Kaye Thompson-Rogers, Ph.D., Jackson State University
- 2006–2007: Ivan B. Turnispeed, Ph.D., University of Nevada, Las Vegas
- 2007–2009: Nameka R. Bates, MS, University of Illinois at Urbana–Champaign
- 2009–2010: Tina L. Ligon, MA, MLS, University of Maryland, College Park
- 2010–2011: Antonio White, MA, Morgan State University
- 2011–2012: Lauren Williams, MPA, Clark Atlanta University
- 2012–2014: Anta Sane, MBA, MSL, Howard University
- 2014–present: John Nwosu, M.Ed, Georgia Southern University

== Conferences ==
=== National ===
- 1989: Social Science Research on Black America, University of Michigan
- 1990: Global Perspective on Black Cultures, Mississippi State University
- 1991: Research and Service: Black Intellectual Activism on the Horizon of the Twenty First Century, University of California, Berkeley
- 1992: The Research Problem: Black Scholarly Activism on the Horizon of the 21st Century, Howard University
- 1993: Cultivating a Vision: The Black Community in the Midst of Global Change, University of Minnesota
- 1994: Promoting the African Diaspora through Education, Mississippi State University
- 1995: From Many, One: People of the African Diaspora, University of Florida
- 1996: Bridging the Gap between Academia and the African Community, Claremont Graduate University
- 1997: Making our Future by the Best Use of Our Present, Alliance of Black Graduate and Professional Students of the University of North Carolina, Chapel Hill in collaboration with the North Carolina Triangle Area Black Graduate Student Alliance
- 1998: The Future of Diversity in Higher Education, University of Texas at Austin
- 1999: Expanding Our Ranks: Black Scholars in the New Millennium, Louisiana State University
- 2000: Facing the Challenge: Black Leadership 2000 and Beyond, University of Wisconsin–Madison
- 2001: Building the Vision Black Scholars in the World of Education and Beyond, Texas Tech University
- 2002: Black Scholars: Connecting Community and Scholarship, Howard University
- 2003: Celebrating 15 Years of the NBGSC: Making a Difference in the Community through Leadership, Scholarship and Service, Atlanta, Georgia
- 2004: Higher Education in Changing Times, University of Cincinnati
- 2005: Mission Possible: Taking Back the Black Community, Charlotte, North Carolina
- 2006: Positively 'Facing the Rising Sun', Las Vegas, Nevada
- 2007: Heirs of the Dream: Building on a Tradition of Intellectual Excellence, Baltimore, Maryland
- 2008: Brilliance in Black, Chicago, Illinois
- 2009: Empowered. Engaged. Expect It!, Houston, Texas
- 2010: Pioneering the Change Within, San Diego, California
- 2011: Transforming Roads Ahead, Columbia, South Carolina
- 2012: Claiming Your Place in Uncommon Spaces, Valley Forge, Pennsylvania
- 2013: Honoring The Past, Defining The Future, Dearborn, Michigan

=== Regional ===
- 2004: Mobilizing the West: Achieving Success and Making a Difference!, University of Nevada, Las Vegas
- 2006: Continuing the Dream of Intellectual Excellence, Norfolk State University
- 2006: Putting the Dream Together, Howard University
- 2006: Birthrights and Blueprints: Black Intellectualism in the American West, University of California, Los Angeles
- 2006: Growing with NBGSA, University of Illinois at Urbana-Champaign
- 2007: Fulfilling the Legacy of Black Achievements, University of Maryland College Park
- 2007: Revitalizing the Black Intellectual Movement, Durham, North Carolina
- 2007: Establishing the Vision for the Future, Purdue University
  2007: Reflection of Black Renaissance: Continuing their Legacy, Fuller Theological Seminary
- 2008: Yes We Can: Decreasing the Disparity of Blacks in Academia, Minnesota State University, Mankato
- 2008: His Dream, His Legacy, Our Destiny, University of Arizona
- 2008: The Fierce Urgency of Now: Black Scholars in a Rapidly Changing World, Bloomsburg University of Pennsylvania
  2009: B.R.I.D.G.E. Building Relationships by Instilling Diversity in Graduate Education, Jackson State University
- 2009: A Community of Scholars: Re-Establishing Purpose Remembering our Identities, Re-Stating our Commitments, University of Illinois at Urbana-Champaign
- 2009: Still We Rise: Only through Sharing History can You Empower Yourself, Arizona State University
- 2009: The Power of Definition: Navigating from Invisible Places to Visible Spaces, Morgan State University
- 2009: Metamorphosis: Changing Yourself by Changing Your Motives, University of South Carolina
- 2010: Finding the Perfect Fit: Keys to Unlocking Self-Potential, Mississippi State University
- 2010: Empowering and Integrating Black Scholars: Looking Back, Reaching Out, Moving Forward in Institutions of Higher Learning, University of Oregon
- 2010: Engagement, Consciousness and Pride: Leadership in the Pan African Community, University of Cincinnati
