= Gordon Stanfield Animation =

Canadian animation studio

Gordon Stanfield Animation Ltd.
- Type: Owned by Gordon Stanfield
- Industry: Motion pictures
- Founded: 1987
- Headquarters: Vancouver, British Columbia, Canada
- Key people: Gordon Stanfield (creative head and president)
- Products: Motion pictures Television style programs
- Number of employees: Varies
- Website: http://www.gordycreative.com

Gordon Stanfield Animation (formerly GSA) is a Canadian animation studio based in Vancouver, British Columbia, with many years of development, pre-production, production, and licensing experience. GSA/Digitoon was the first digital studio in western Canada and is active with various animated productions. Since 2022, GSA has operated under "Gordy Creative". GSA/Gordy produces children's' content, while its sister company, Gordy/Pristine Entertainment, is producing films and series for adults.
