= GITAM School of Law =

Law college in Andhra Pradesh

GITAM School of Law (GSL) a private law school is one of the constituent institutions of GITAM (Deemed to be University), situated at Rushikonda in Visakhapatnam in the Indian state of Andhra Pradesh. The law school offers 5 Year Integrated BA.LLB (Hons), BBA.LLB (Hons) and One Year LL.M programmes with specialization in IPR & Cyber Law, Corporate Law and International Law & WTO approved by the Bar Council of India (BCI), New Delhi.

== History ==
This School of Law was established in 2012 by the Gandhi Institute of Technology and Management.
