= Gandhi Institute of Technology and Management =

Deemed university in India

- Motto in English: Nurturing Valuable Futures
- Type: Deemed to be University
- Established: 1980
- Founder: M. V. V. S. Murthi
- Chancellor: Virander Singh Chauhan
- Vice-Chancellor: Dr. Errol D'Souza
- President: Sribharat Mathukumilli
- Location: Bengaluru (Karnataka), Hyderabad (Telangana), Visakhapatnam (Andhra Pradesh), India
- Campus: Urban
- Website: www.gitam.edu

Gandhi Institute of Technology and Management (GITAM) is a private deemed university located in Visakhapatnam, Hyderabad and Bengaluru. The university was founded by the late M. V. V. S. Murthi in Visakhapatnam in 1980. It was previously affiliated with Andhra University as GITAM College before gaining autonomous status in the year 2007.

The campus in Visakhapatnam is one of the oldest, and spans over 80 acres. Collectively, the three campuses host 19 institutions under their wing.

== Campuses ==
=== Visakhapatnam ===
Gandhi Institute of Technology and Management Visakhapatnam Campus (GITAM Vishakapatnam Campus) established in 1980, the campus sits on the shores of Rushikonda Beach. It accommodates over 6000 students and boasts 6 auditoriums, along with 5 hostels for boys and 3 for girls.

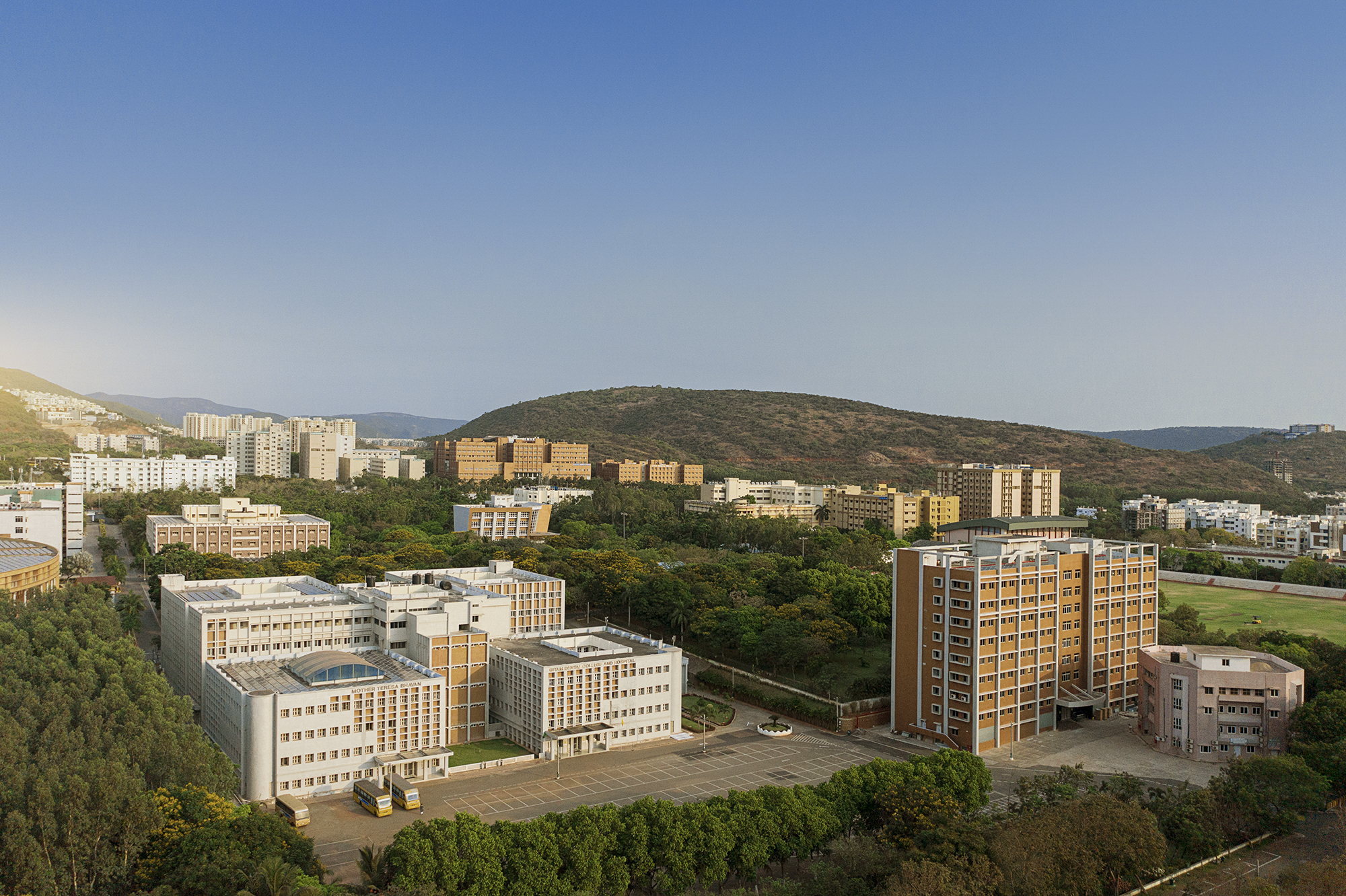
Visakhapatnam Campus

=== Hyderabad ===
Gandhi Institute of Technology and Management Hyderabad Campus (GITAM Hyderabad Campus) is located in Hyderabad, Telangana. The campus admitted its first batch of students in 2009. It has been accredited by NAAC with ‘A+’ grade and AICTE approved. ICRA, a rating agency, gives a national grade of "ICRA EB3 IN" and a state grade of " ICRA EB3+ AP" to the MBA program of Hyderabad Business School.

The GITAM Hyderabad campus has seven schools - GITAM School of Technology, GITAM School of Business, GITAM School of Pharmacy, GITAM School of Architecture, GITAM School of Science, GITAM School of Humanities & Social Sciences and Kautilya School of Public Policy. The co-curricular and extra-curricular activities create a platform for various student bodies and chapters such as Indian Society for Technical Education, IEEE, Computer Society of India, IETE, IEI, ISOI and Engineers Without Borders. The campus hostel has 2 blocks each, for girls and boys with other student support services. They can accommodate 1600 students.

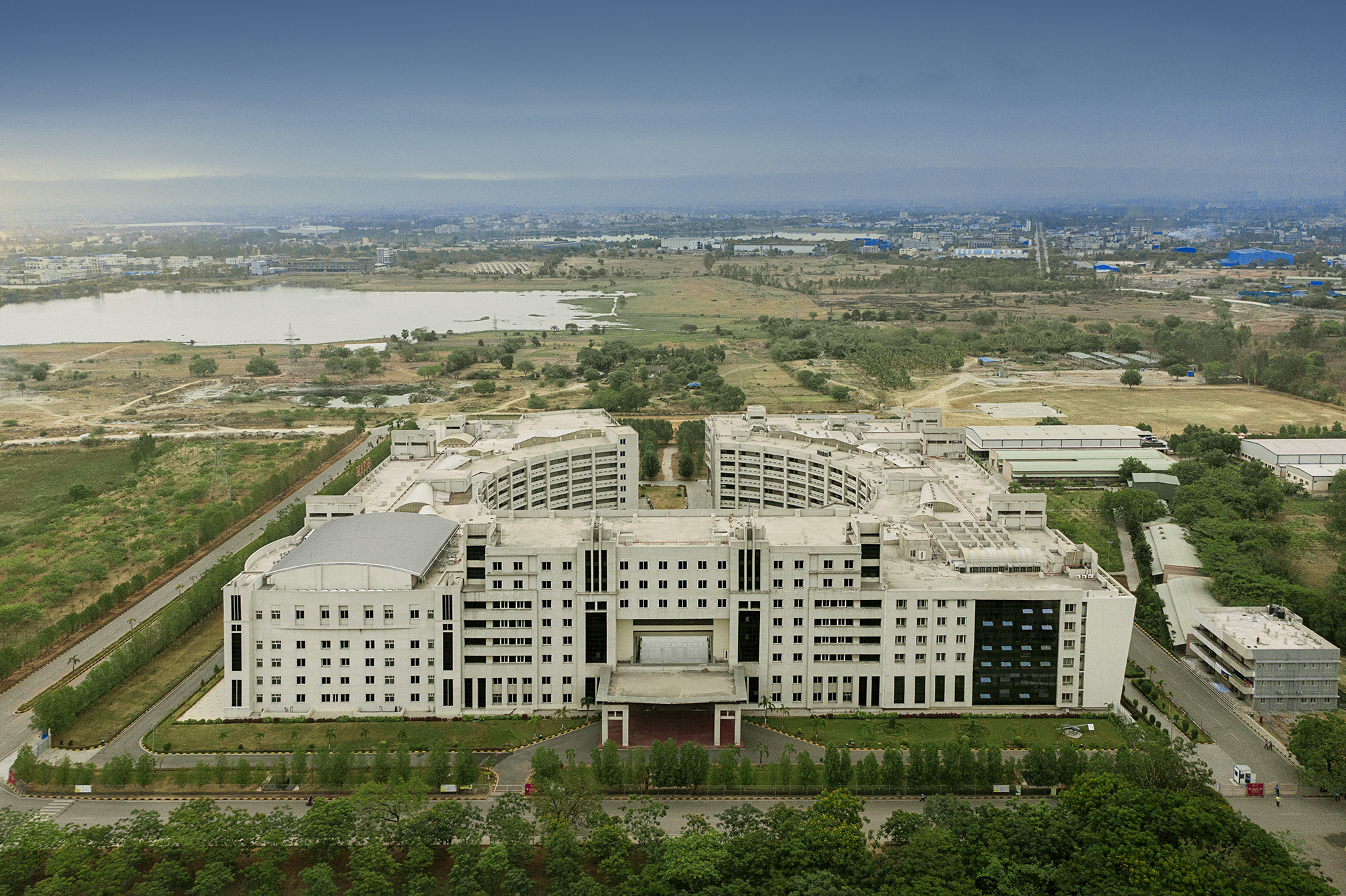
Hyderabad Campus

Senior industry executives visit the campus to deliver guest lectures.

==== Kibbutz 2010 ====
GITAM Institute of Management located at Rudraram in Medak district, organized Kibbutz 2010, a techno-management fest, in March 2010.

Kibbutz (ki-boots), a word of Hebrew origin, denotes 'a community settlement organized under collectivist principles' and connotes the spirit of working together as a team.

The competitive events of the fest included Blueprint Blues (business plan presentation), In 'Quiz' itive (quiz), Entre-prerana (entrepreneurship), Ad-X-press (advertisement designing), Tit 4 Tat (debating), Sea Program (programming and de-bugging), Chakra View (treasure hunt), Splurge (face painting), Dance-pe-Chance (dance), Dyno-Mike (singing), and Ishtyle-O-Meter (fashion show).

About 450 students from 75 colleges across the twin cities took part in the events.

==== Pramana ====
The annual techno-cultural-management fest of GITAM Hyderabad which is held in the first week of Feb every year. Pramana attracts 7000+ students from all across the country and is the largest fest in GITAM. It has witnessed some international stars like DJ Mariana Bo (Top 68 DJ in the World), Shaan, Zeaden, Sunburn Campus, VH1 Supersonic, The Lost Triplets, and some singers like LV Revanth, Yazin Nizar, Saketh Komanduri, Sony Komanduri and many more. The fest also has many events like Battle of Bands that featured the Threory Band.

=== GIMSR Visakhapatnam campus ===
In 2015, the GITAM Institute of Medical Sciences and Research (GIMSR) was founded as a private medical college and teaching hospital.

GIMSR enrolls 150 students annually for the MBBS undergraduate programme based on the National Eligibility cum Entrance Test (NEET) and 52 postgraduate students in various medical specialties. The college currently has around 200 medical faculty members, 170 paramedical staff, 350 nursing, administrative and support staff. GITAM has its main campus located in Visakhapatnam, Andhra Pradesh, with additional campuses in Hyderabad, Telangana and Bengaluru, Karnataka.

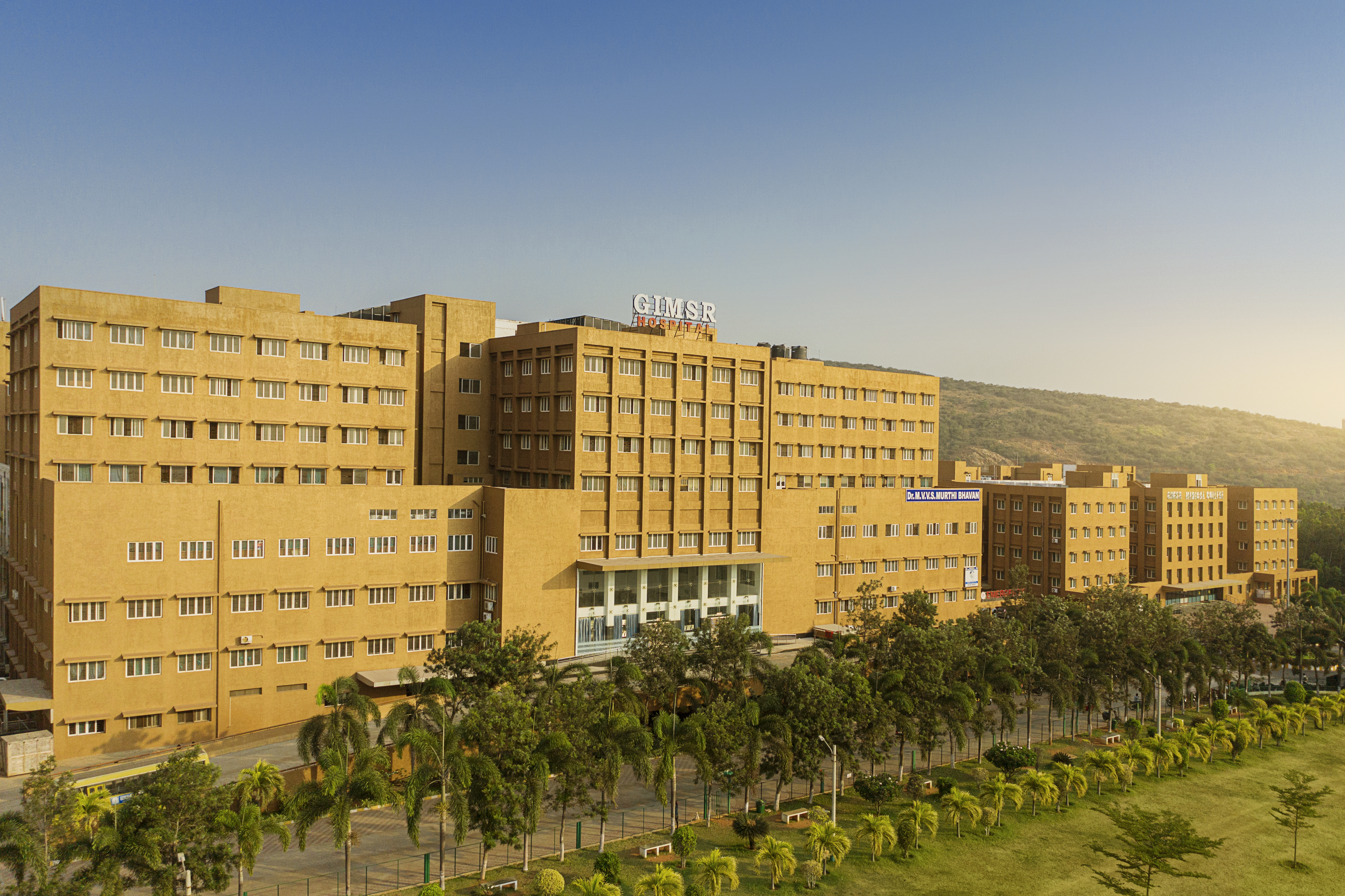
GIMSR Visakhapatnam Campus

=== Bengaluru ===
The GITAM Bengaluru Campus was established in 2012 and is located near the IT hub of the city. The campus is provided with smart classrooms, laboratories, auditoria, seminar halls, playfields, student hostels and other student support services. This campus consists of four schools: GITAM School of Technology, GITAM School of Business, GITAM School of Science and GITAM School of Humanities & Social Sciences.

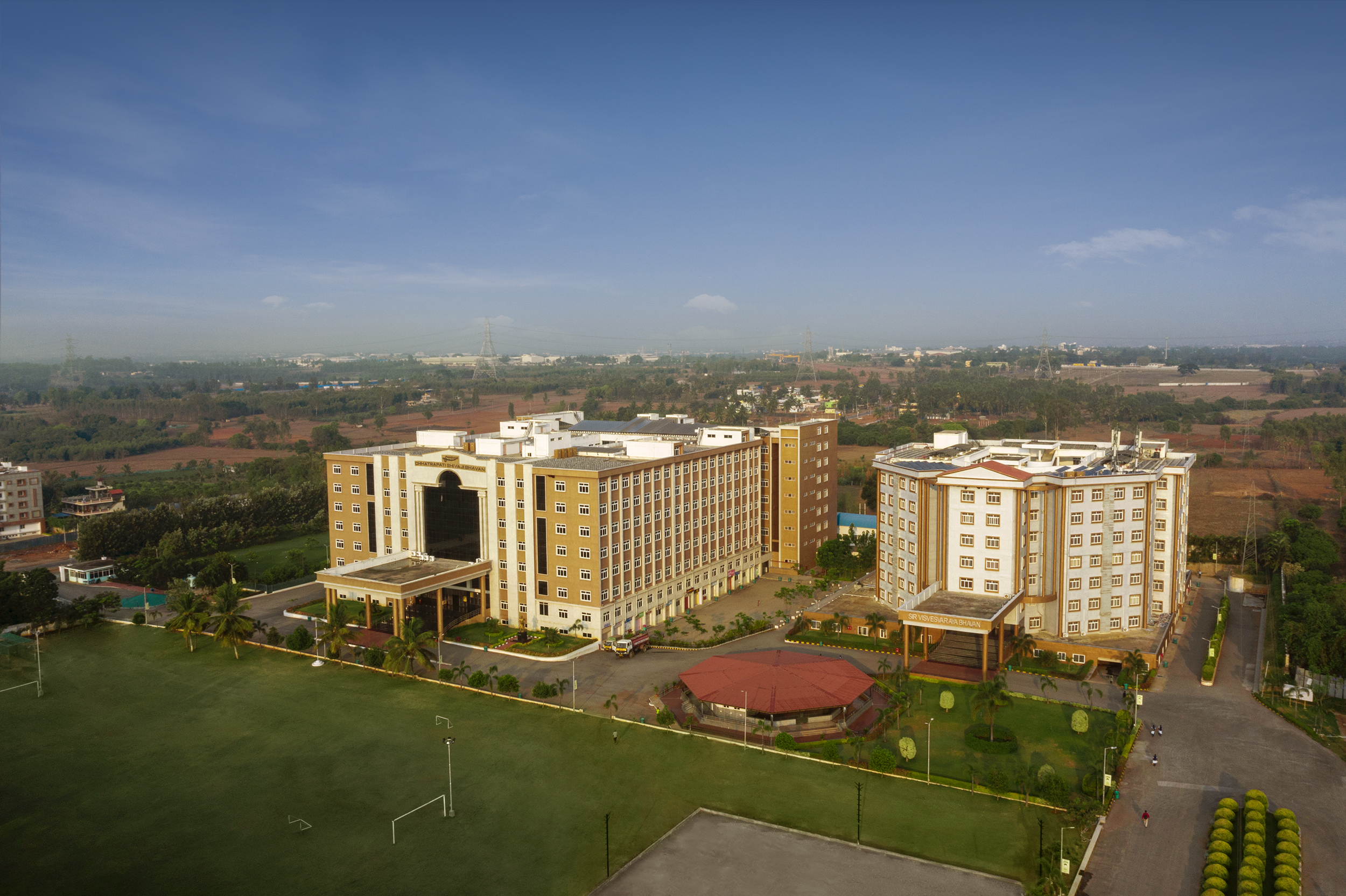
Bengaluru Campus

== Academics ==
The university offers courses in the fields of engineering, science, and business at undergraduate and postgraduate levels.

=== Visakhapatnam campus ===
- GITAM School of Architecture
- GITAM School of Law
- GITAM School of Technology
- GITAM School of Science
- GITAM School of Business
- GITAM School of Humanities & Social Sciences
- GITAM School of Pharmacy

=== GIMSR Visakhapatnam campus ===
Institutes in GIMSR Campus, Visakhapatnam

- GITAM Institute of Medical Sciences and Research
- GITAM School of Paramedical Sciences
- GITAM School of Physiotherapy
- GITAM Institute of Nursing
- GITAM Hospital

=== Hyderabad campus ===
- GITAM School of Technology
- GITAM School of Business
- GITAM School of Science
- GITAM School of Pharmacy
- GITAM School of Architecture
- GITAM School of Humanities & Social Sciences
- Kautilya School of Public Policy (KSPP)

=== Bengaluru campus ===
- GITAM School of Business
- GITAM School of Humanities and Social Sciences
- GITAM School of Science
- GITAM School of Technology

== Accreditations and rankings ==
University and College rankings

General – India
- NIRF (Overall) (2022): 101-150
- NIRF (Universities) (2022): 95

Architecture – India
- NIRF (2024): 39

In March 2023, the National Assessment and Accreditation Council (NAAC) granted GITAM an 'A++' grade after it secured a 3.54 CGPA out of 4 in the third cycle of accreditation, for an extended duration of seven years. GITAM is accredited by AICTE for Engineering, Management and MCA, COA for Architecture, PCI for pharmacy, INC for Nursing, NMC for medical and BCI for law programs.

GITAM is ranked as a Category-‘I’ University by the Ministry of Human Resource Development, Govt. of India. It is also accredited by the NAAC with an ‘A++’ grade and is ranked 95th in the University category in NIRF Ranking 202 of MHRD.

GITAM Institute of Technology and Management is ranked 95th among universities in India by the National Institutional Ranking Framework (NIRF) in 2022 and in the 101–150 band in the overall category. In 2019, The Week & Hansa Research's best B-School survey ranked GITAM's Hyderabad Business School as 5th[10] in top B-schools in Hyderabad and 20th in the Southern zone.

For the year 2022, NIRF ranked GITAM at All India #92 for University, listed in 101-150 for Overall Rankings, All India Rank #33 for Dental and All India Rank #49 for Pharmacy. THE Impact Ranking, the university was listed Work Rank #601 -800 for Good Health & Wellbeing and world rank #401 - 600 for Overall World Rankings. QS listed GITAM at position #91 for India Rank for India Universities Ranking 2023, South Asia Rank of #160, International Trade Rankings #62 with a Happiness Index Award of Top 20 Institutes in India.

Times Higher Educated listed GITAM among 1501+ in World University Rankings, 501+ in Asia University Rankings, World Rank #401+ for Young University Rankings. UI Green Metric listed GITAM at World Rank #340. On Webo Metrics Ranking (Scopus), GITAM was ranked at World Rank #2373, India Rank #84 and a South Asia Rank #114.

== Partnerships and collaborations ==
GITAM has signed MoUs with universities like Elon University, Central Michigan University, University of Nottingham, Institute polytechnique des sciences avancées (IPSA), UNITAR lnternational University, University of Melbourne, IQS School of Management, Saint Petersberg University, National Law School of India University to facilitate research collaborations and academic partnerships.

Through Twinning Programme, undergraduate students of GITAM can choose to study for two years at GITAM and then spend another two years at one of its partner universities like Central Michigan University, Florida International University, University of Nebraska, IQS School of Management to earn a degree from the partner institution.

GITAM has partnered with University of Melbourne to offer Joint BSc dual degree programme where the students will spend the initial two years studying in India and the subsequent two years on campus in Melbourne. There is an option available to be directly admitted to the University of Melbourne's Postgraduate programme. Upon completion of the programme, students will receive a Bachelor of Science degree from both GITAM University and the University of Melbourne.

Memorandum of Understanding (MoU) has been signed between GITAM and Cheongju University, Republic of Korea for their collaboration on a renewable wind energy project, facilitating the two institutions to collaborate in the areas of academics and research.

== Notable alumni ==
- Amala Chebolu, Playback Singer
- Ankith Koyya, Actor
- Chaitan Bharadwaj, Musician
- Gautami Tadimalla, Actress
- Praveen Kandregula, Director
- Sree Vishnu, Actor
- Sri Krishna Devarayalu Lavu, Member of Parliament

== Student activities ==
GITAM is a host to many student activities both professional and cultural. GITAM University Science & Activity Centre, professional societies include ASME, SAE, Indian Society for Technical Education, IEEE, Computer Society of India, IETE, IEI, ISOI and Engineers Without Borders. Cultural societies include Kalakriti, G-studio, G-Mag, E-Cell, Toastmasters International, National Cadet Corps, National Service Scheme and other community services like Rotaract and Vivan.

== Controversies ==
=== 2020 Land encroachment allegations and demolition ===
In October 2020, revenue officials and the Greater Visakhapatnam Municipal Corporation (GVMC) demolished several structures on the GITAM University campus in Visakhapatnam, including compound walls and an underpass. The state government, then led by the YSR Congress Party (YSRCP), alleged that the university had illegally encroached upon 40.51 acres of government land in the Rushikonda and Yendada areas. According to revenue officials, this land had been originally earmarked for various state departments, including social welfare hostels and training centers.

The demolition sparked a political row in Andhra Pradesh. The Telugu Desam Party (TDP)—to which GITAM's founder, the late M. V. V. S. Murthi, and its current chairman, M. Sri Bharat, are affiliated—condemned the move as a "political vendetta" by the YSRCP government. State ministers defended the action, stating that the institution was operating as a commercial entity, charging high fees without adhering to reservation rules, and that the government was reclaiming public property.

=== 2026 Land regularisation dispute ===
The land dispute resurfaced in early 2026 after the TDP returned to power. On January 30, 2026, the GVMC council passed a resolution to regularise 54.79 acres of the disputed land in Rushikonda and Endada in favor of GITAM. The council meeting was marked by protests from opposition YSRCP and Left-wing corporators, who accused Chief Minister N. Chandrababu Naidu of gifting public real estate to his relatives (GITAM Chairman M. Sri Bharat is Naidu's family member by marriage).

Activists and former civil servants, including former Union Energy Secretary E. A. S. Sarma, opposed the regularisation. Sarma sought probes by the Central Bureau of Investigation (CBI) and the Enforcement Directorate (ED), arguing that long-standing encroachments on government land cannot be legally regularised and that the university effectively operates as a for-profit business rather than a charitable trust.

In response, M. Sri Bharat denied allegations that the land was being given to the university for free. He stated that the land's value was being exaggerated by the opposition and affirmed that GITAM was prepared to pay whatever price the state government and the Chief Commissioner of Land Administration fixed for the regularisation process.
