= Tariffs in the first Trump administration =

United States trade deficits from 1997 to 2021. Deficits are over 50 billion dollars as of 2021 with the countries shown. Data from the US Census Bureau.

During his first term as president of the United States, Donald Trump enacted a series of tariffs involving protectionist trade initiatives against other countries, most notably China. It involved tariffs on foreign imports imposed by Trump. Since long before he became president in 2017, Trump had promoted tariffs on imports to retaliate against countries he believes are "ripping-off" the United States.

In January 2018, Trump imposed tariffs on solar panels and washing machines of 30–50%. In March 2018, he imposed tariffs on steel (25%) and aluminum (10%) from most countries, which, according to Morgan Stanley, covered an estimated 4.1% of U.S. imports. In June 2018, this was extended to the European Union, Canada, and Mexico. The Trump administration separately set and escalated tariffs on goods imported from China, leading to a trade war.

Trading partners implemented retaliatory tariffs on U.S. goods. In June 2018, India planned to recoup trade penalties of $241 million on $1.2 billion worth of Indian steel and aluminum, but attempted talks delayed these until June 2019 when India imposed retaliatory tariffs on $240 million worth of U.S. goods. Canada imposed matching retaliatory tariffs on July 1, 2018. China implemented retaliatory tariffs equivalent to the $34 billion tariff imposed on it by the U.S. In July 2018, the Trump administration announced it would use a Great Depression-era program, the Commodity Credit Corporation (CCC), to pay farmers up to $12 billion, increasing the transfers to farmers to $ 28 billion in May 2019. The USDA estimated that aid payments constituted more than one-third of total farm income in 2019 and 2020.

Tariff negotiations in North America were relatively more successful, with the U.S. lifting the steel and aluminum tariffs on Canada and Mexico on May 20, 2019, joining Australia and Argentina in being the only nations exempted from the regulations. However, on May 30, Trump unilaterally announced his intention to impose a five percent tariff on all imports from Mexico beginning on June 10, with tariffs increasing to 10% on July 1, and by another 5% each month for three months, "until such time as illegal migrants coming through Mexico, and into our Country, STOP", adding illegal immigration as a condition for U.S.-Mexico tariff negotiations. The move was seen as threatening the ratification of the United States–Mexico–Canada Agreement (USMCA), the North American trade deal set to replace the North American Free Trade Agreement (NAFTA). The tariffs were averted on June 7 after negotiations.

A May 2019 analysis conducted by CNBC found Trump's tariffs are equivalent to one of the largest tax increases in the U.S. in decades. Studies have found that Trump's tariffs reduced real income in the United States, as well as adversely affecting U.S. GDP. Some studies also concluded that the tariffs adversely affected Republican candidates in elections. A study found that political donations had a notable impact on the likelihood of tariff exemptions.

President Trump's successor, President Biden (succeeded by President Trump later), kept most of the tariffs in place, dropping tariffs on European steel while further expanding tariffs on goods such as EVs and semiconductors from China, resulting in more tax revenue being collected from tariffs under Biden than under the first Trump administration.

== Background ==
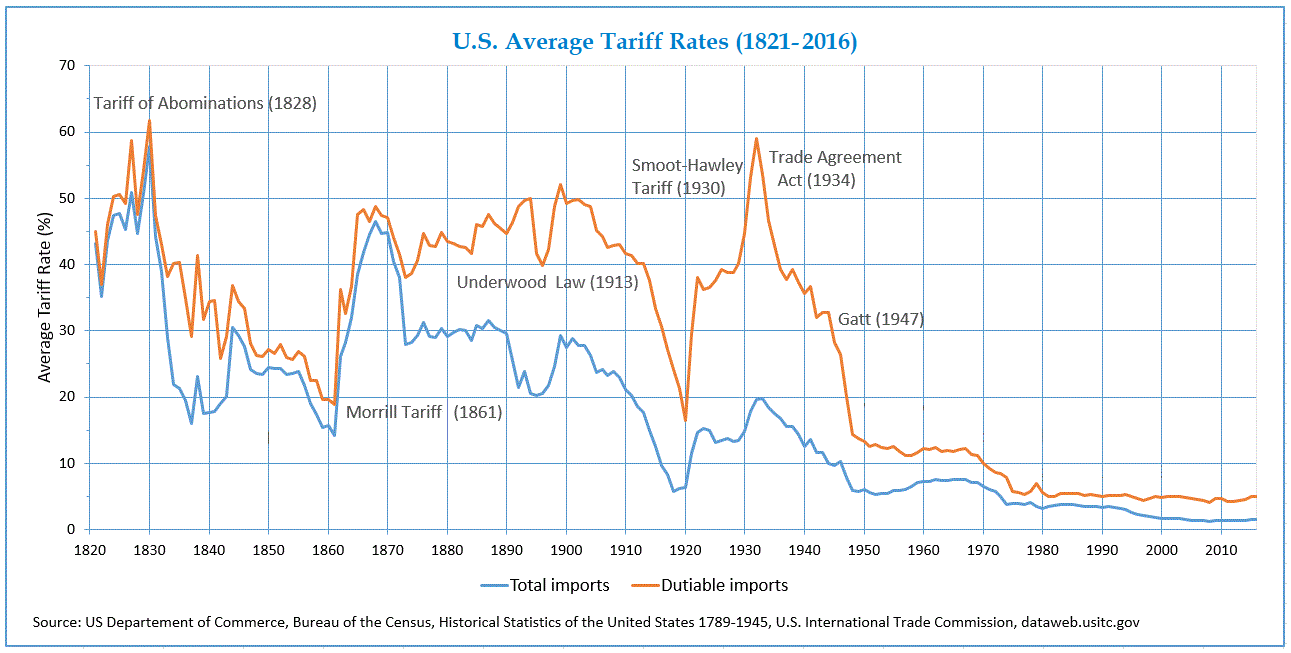
Average tariff rates in the U.S., 1821–2016

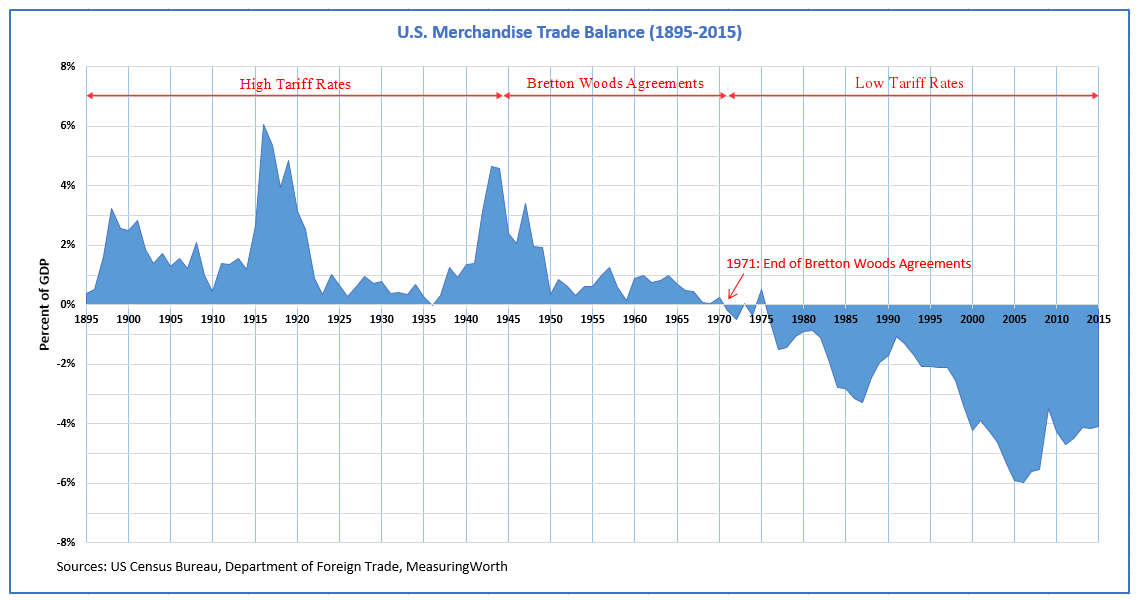
U.S. Trade Balance and Trade Policy, 1895–2015

The Republican Party was strongly pro-tariff from the days of Abraham Lincoln until the Cold War. Republicans passed record high tariffs in the 1920s and early 1930s, which were widely blamed for worsening the Great Depression. Donald Trump has argued that the GOP betrayed its roots by becoming in favor of free trade and has cited William McKinley in particular as an influence on his anti-free trade views. Trump adopted his current views on trade issues in the 1980s, saying Japan and other nations were taking advantage of the United States. During the 2016 presidential campaign, Trump repeatedly favored policy proposals that renegotiate trade agreements for the United States. His chief trade advisor during the campaign was Peter Navarro, who favored the use of tariffs, especially against China. During a meeting with The New York Times Editorial Board in January 2016, Trump said he would tax Chinese imports into the United States by 45%. Trump frequently criticized the North American Free Trade Agreement, calling it "the worst trade deal the U.S. has ever signed". He also called Trans-Pacific Partnership "the death blow for American manufacturing" and said it would "put the interests of foreign countries above our own".

=== Policy ===
On November 21, 2016, in a video message, Trump introduced an economic strategy of "putting America first", saying he would negotiate "fair, bilateral trade deals that bring jobs and industry back on to American shores". On January 23, 2017, three days after becoming president, Trump withdrew the United States from the politically divisive Trans-Pacific Partnership believing the agreement would "undermine" the U.S. economy and sovereignty.

Trump had also indicated a desire to end the North American Free Trade Agreement with Canada and Mexico. His administration renegotiated the terms of the agreement. Trump had threatened to withdraw from it if negotiations failed. He specifically criticized the Ford Motor Co., Carrier Corporation, and Mondelez International for having operations based in Mexico. In August 2015, in response to Oreo maker Mondelez International's announcement that it would move manufacturing to Mexico, Trump said he would boycott Oreos. The new deal increased the percentage of parts and manufacturing that must be done in North America for domestic automobiles, setting a minimum wage for some workers on auto parts, and expanding access for U.S. dairy sales to Canada.

Similar to his approach to trade deals, Trump also pledged, as part of the Contract with the American Voter, to impose tariffs to discourage companies from laying off workers or relocating to other countries, through an "End the Offshoring Act". No such act has been introduced in Congress, but Trump moved to impose tariffs on solar panels, washing machines, steel, and aluminum. The enforcement of the tariffs fell primarily within the purview of the Department of Commerce and Office of the United States Trade Representative.

Trump repeatedly promised to lower America's trade deficit, and argued for a renegotiation of trade deals and imposition of tariffs to that end. These efforts notwithstanding, during 2018 the trade deficit continued to increase.

In November 2018, Trump argued that the tariffs enriched the United States. He said the United States was gaining "Billions of Dollars" from "Tariffs being charged to China". He added, "If companies don't want to pay Tariffs, build in the U.S.A. Otherwise, let's just make our Country richer than ever before!" Fact-checkers and economists described the assertions made by Trump as false, with the Associated Press writing "Almost all economists say the president is wrong. That's because tariffs are taxes on imports. They can cause higher prices, reduce trade among countries and hurt overall economic growth as a result."

=== Legality ===
Article 1, Section 8 of the Constitution: "Congress shall have Power To lay and collect Taxes, Duties, Imposts and Excises." But Congress has repeatedly shifted its powers regarding tariffs to the president. Beginning in 1917 with the Trading with the Enemy Act of 1917, the president can impose any tariff while the nation is at war. The affected trade does not have to be connected to the ongoing war. Since 1974, the Trade Act of 1974 allows the president to impose a 15% tariff for 150 days if there is "an adverse impact on national security from imports." After 150 days, the tariff expires unless extended by Congress.

In 1977, the International Emergency Economic Powers Act shifted powers even more towards the White House. The Trump administration claims that it gives the President the authority to raise tariffs without any limits during a national emergency of any kind. Legal scholar Gerard Magliocca disagreed because the IEEPA does not mention tariffs at all and transfers no authority of tariffs towards the President.

== Enacted ==
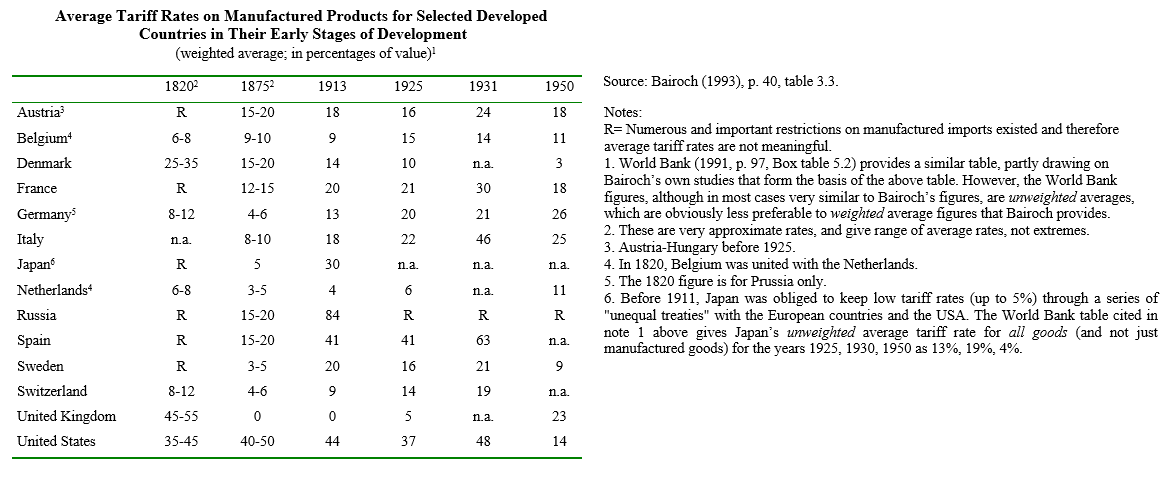
The historical average tariff rates on manufactured products

=== Solar panels ===
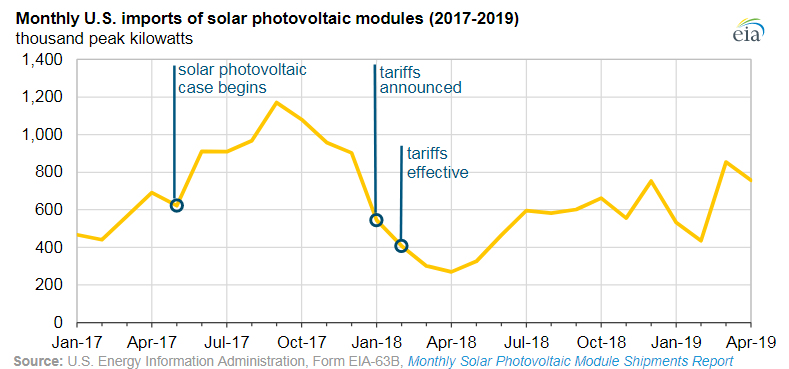
The effect of tariffs on U.S. solar panel imports

On January 23, 2018, Trump imposed tariffs on solar panels produced outside the United States. The tariffs initially started at 30% and gradually fell to 15% over the next four years. The first 2.5 gigawatts of solar cells imported each year were exempted from the tariff.

As of 2018 China was the world leader in solar panel manufacture. It decried the tariffs, with Zhong Shan, the Chinese Ministry of Commerce stating, "With regard to the wrong measures taken by the United States, China will work with other W.T.O. members to resolutely defend our legitimate interests."

In 2022, President Biden extended the now 15% tariff on solar panels another four years.

=== Washing machines ===
On January 23, 2018, in conjunction with the tariffs placed on solar panels, the Office of the U.S. Trade Representative announced tariffs on washing machines. According to the U.S. International Trade Commission (ITC), imports of large residential washers increased "steadily" from 2012 to 2016, and domestic producers' financial performance "declined precipitously". In the first year, the tariffs started at 20% for the first 1.2 million units of imported finished washers, and 50% for all further imports. In the second year the tariff was 18/45% and in the third year 16/40%.

The tariffs came after a petition was filed by Whirlpool, a U.S.-based washing machine manufacturer facing tough competition from LG Electronics and Samsung, which are both based in South Korea.

Two weeks before the tariff announcement, Samsung moved its production of washing machines to a new plant in Newberry South Carolina; they opened a second line in March 2018, doubling manufacturing capacity at the plant. In late 2018 LG opened its first washing machine manufacturing site located in the US, in Clarksville, Tennessee, as part of a "preemptive move to reduce logistics costs, tariffs and delivery time," subsequently adding a dryer line in 2023

In January 2021, President Biden extended the washing machine tariffs by two years to February 2023, when they expired. There is conflicting information about the effects of the washing machine tariffs. UBS analysts reported that US consumers were paying 42% more for washing machines in 2022 than in 2017, compared to a 3% rise over the same time period in Europe. An economic report from Duke University suggested washing machine prices changed little after the 2016 imposition of tariffs on washing machines from China as manufacturers could simply relocate to other export platform countries, but prices rose by ten per cent in the year after the 2018 imposition of the global tariffs on all imported washing machines, falling by 13 per cent after the tariffs expired in February 2023, suggesting a full passthrough of the cost of the tariffs to consumers. However an opinion piece in trade magazine IndustryWeek suggested that the price spike had been temporary, and that there had been no long term effect on prices.

=== Steel and aluminum ===
On March 1, 2018, Trump announced his intention to impose a 25% tariff on steel and a 10% tariff on aluminum imports. In a tweet the next day, Trump asserted, "Trade wars are good, and easy to win." On March 8, he signed an order to impose the tariffs effective after 15 days. The EU, Canada, Mexico, Australia, Argentina, Brazil and South Korea were temporarily exempted from the order under a carve-out provision. Canada, Mexico, and the EU became subject to the steel and aluminium tariffs later in an announcement on May 31, 2018. The U.S., Canada, and Mexico would reach a deal to remove the steel and aluminum tariffs in May 2019, almost a year after going into effect.

In December 2019, Trump tweeted that he would impose tariffs on Brazilian and Argentine metals, effective immediately, alleging the countries were manipulating their currencies to make their products more attractive in global markets. Economists disagreed the countries were devaluing their currencies, attributing the declines to global market forces. After speaking with Brazilian president Jair Bolsonaro, Trump days later backed down from his threat against Brazil, but made no mention of Argentina.

==== Exemptions and lifting of steel tariffs ====
While the 25% steel tariff applied to all countries worldwide, four countries (Argentina, Brazil, South Korea and Australia) successfully negotiated an exemption from it in 2018. In December 2019, President Trump threatened to reinstate steel and aluminium tariffs against Brazil and Argentina, although did not in the end pursue this.

On May 17, 2019, the U.S. reached a deal to lift the steel and aluminum tariffs on Mexico and Canada. Lifting the tariffs were seen as helping pave the way for further ratification of the United States–Mexico–Canada Agreement. In a joint statement, the Canadian and the U.S. governments said the U.S. will scrap the metals duties within two days of the deal. Canada will remove tariffs levied on American goods in retaliation for the steel and aluminum duties. The countries agreed to drop all pending litigation in the World Trade Organization related to the tariffs, set up measures to "prevent the importation of aluminum or steel that is unfairly subsidized and/or sold at dumped prices" and "prevent the transshipment of aluminum and steel made outside of Canada or the United States to the other country" and make an "agreed-upon process for monitoring aluminum and steel trade between them". In a separate statement, the Mexican government also said it would remove retaliatory tariffs it put on the U.S. and cease pending litigation. Mexico also said it would set up measures to stop unfair trade practices in the aluminum and steel markets and to monitor trade of the metals in North America.

In 2021, the Biden administration reached settlements with the United Kingdom and Japan to remove the tariffs. The same year, President Biden and European Union president Ursula von der Leyen suspended tariffs for specific quantities of aluminum and steel that were entirely manufactured within the EU, while they pursued a longer-term trade agreement. The Biden administration subsequently advocated for a Global Arrangement on Sustainable Steel and Aluminum, a trade pact that connects U.S. and European markets and taxes steel producers based on their membership and the environmental impact of their metal production.

=== Legal basis and challenges ===
The legal basis cited in Trump's tariff order is Section 232 of the Trade Expansion Act of 1962 which under certain circumstances allows the president to impose tariffs based on the recommendation from the U.S. Secretary of Commerce if "an article is being imported into the United States in such quantities or under such circumstances as to threaten or impair the national security." This section is rarely used, and has never been invoked since the World Trade Organization was established in 1995.

China initiated a WTO complaint against the U.S. steel and aluminum tariffs on April 9, 2018. The EU opened a similar WTO case on June 1, 2018.

On June 9, 2018, Trump tweeted a statement addressing Prime Minister of Canada Justin Trudeau in which he said American tariffs targeting Canada "are in response to his [tariffs] of 270% on dairy!" In the tweet, Trump did not cite national security, the legal basis for implementing the tariff.

In December 2022, the WTO ruled against the United States in steel and aluminum cases brought by China, Norway, Switzerland, and Turkey, saying that there was no national security emergency that justified U.S. invocation of the exception. USTR spokesperson Adam Hodge, responded that "The United States has held the clear and unequivocal position, for over 70 years, that issues of national security cannot be reviewed in WTO dispute settlement and the WTO has no authority to second-guess the ability of a WTO member to respond to a wide-range of threats to its security." The Biden administration condemned the decision and affirmed that they would not remove the tariffs Trump had imposed. The United States has blocked appointment of judges to the WTO appeals court, so its appeal prevents the ruling from being adopted. Cases brought by Russia and India remain unresolved.

=== Economic and trade analysis ===
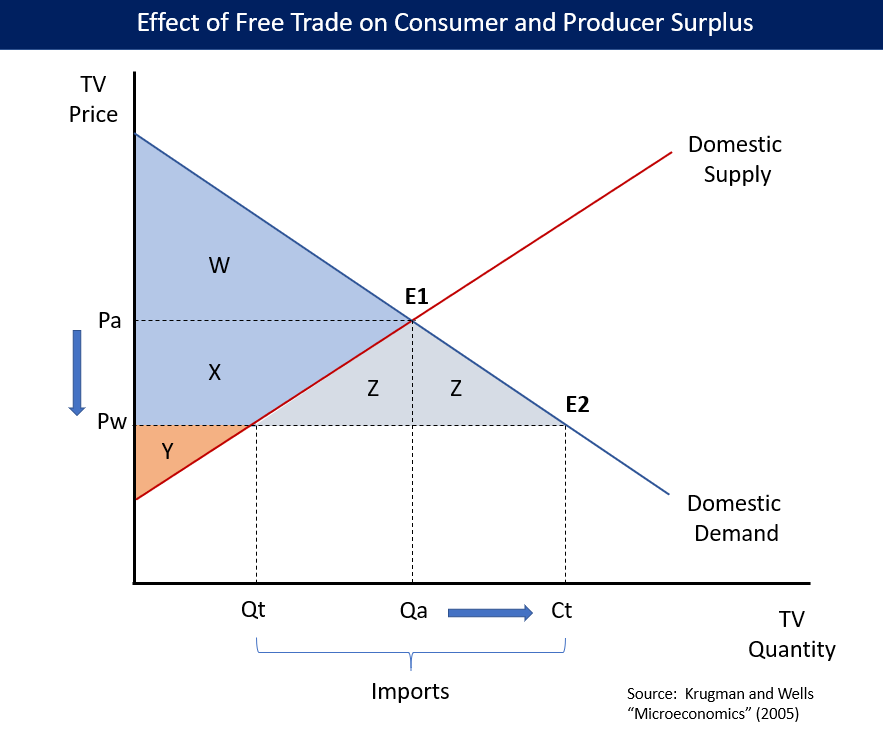
Opening trade to imports lowers the price from Pa to Pw and increases the quantity from Qa to Ct. This increases consumer surplus (the area under the demand curve but above price) by X+Z as consumers can purchase more goods at lower prices. However, it also reduces producer surplus (the area above the supply curve but below the price) by X, as domestic producers supply fewer goods at lower prices. Domestic producers will choose to produce at Qt, with the quantity gap between Qt and Ct filled by imports. This overall gain from free trade is area Z, although there are winners (consumers) and losers (domestic firms and their employees).

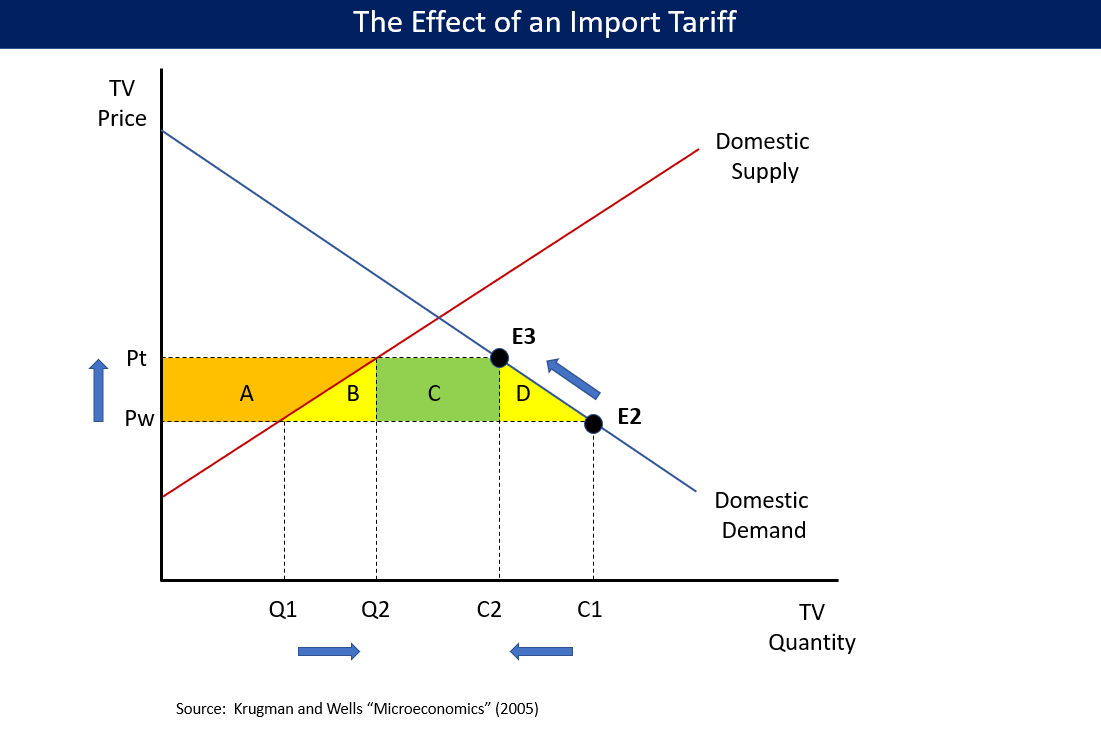
Diagram showing effects of an import tariff, which hurts domestic consumers more than domestic producers are helped. Higher prices and lower quantities reduce consumer surplus (the area above price but under the demand curve) by areas A+B+C+D, while expanding producer surplus (the area below price but above the supply curve) by A and government revenue by C (the import quantity times the tariff price.) Areas B and D are dead-weight losses, surplus lost by consumers and overall.

A survey of leading economists by the Initiative on Global Markets at the University of Chicago Booth School of Business showed a consensus that imposing new U.S. tariffs on steel and aluminum will not improve Americans' welfare. Economists say the tariffs will lead to more harm than gains, as the price for steel increases, which will harm consumers and Americans working in manufacturing industries that use steel (these jobs outnumber those who work in steel-producing sectors by 80 to 1).

The big winners of the tariffs are some American steel- and aluminum-producing industries; some of the producers (especially small- and middle-sized ones) who are reliant on foreign inputs may struggle as a result of the tariffs. A study of the proposal indicated that it would lead to an estimated loss of 146,000 jobs. Studies of the 2002 steel tariffs enacted by the Bush administration show that they caused more job losses than job gains. Jobs losses could be even greater if other countries retaliate against the United States with their own tariffs on various American products.

Scholars warned that the Trump administration's use of "national security" rationales (these have not been commonly used by past administrations) for the tariffs could undermine the international trading order, as other states could use the same rationales for their own tariffs. The WTO allows states to take actions necessary to ensure their national security, but this provision has been sparsely used, given that it could be abused. Whereas national security reasons were cited for the tariffs, it has been noted that tariffs primarily harm American allies, not enemies; the United States imports very little steel and aluminum from China directly. Trade experts furthermore noted that the United States already produces more than two-thirds of its own steel.

Forty-five U.S. trade associations are urging Trump not to impose tariffs on China, warning it would be "particularly harmful" to the U.S. economy and consumers.

The National Retail Federation has been vocal in its opposition of the tariffs. The NRF also launched an ad campaign with Ben Stein, who reprised his role as the economics teacher from "Ferris Bueller's Day Off" arguing that tariffs are bad economics and hurt consumers.

General Motors announced closure of plants in Maryland, Michigan, Ohio, and Ontario, and cutting over 14,000 jobs, citing steel tariffs as a factor. Trump expressed frustration with the decision.

=== Domestic political response ===
Domestically, reactions from elected officials often varied among regional lines rather than ideological lines. The tariffs saw widespread criticism from conservatives and Republicans. However, the Republican-controlled Congress had declined to take any action to counter Trump's imposition of tariffs. Speaker Paul Ryan said Congress would not pass any tariff legislation that Trump would veto.

Reception was mixed among Democratic officials, with Democrats from Rust Belt states voicing support for tariffs on steel and aluminum imports.

The AFL–CIO, the largest labor union in the U.S., praised Trump for the tariffs, as did Democratic Ohio Senator Sherrod Brown, who said the action would be a boon for "steel plants across Ohio". Many congressional Republicans expressed fear that the tariffs might damage the economy or lead to retaliatory tariffs from other countries. Speaker of the House Paul Ryan and Senate Majority Leader Mitch McConnell urged Trump to rethink his proposal or to target the tariffs more narrowly so as to avoid "unintended consequences and collateral damage".

House Minority Leader Nancy Pelosi, while calling for strategic and targeted actions against "trade cheaters", criticized Trump's rollout of the tariffs, calling it "chaotic" and saying it was "maximizing the collateral damage to American workers, consumers and our international alliances". The proposal drew comparisons to a tariff imposed by his Republican presidential predecessor, George W. Bush; in 2002 the U.S. imposed heavy steel tariffs that were largely seen as ineffectual or even harmful to the U.S., and were withdrawn after 18 months.

On March 6, 2018, Gary Cohn, chair of the National Economic Council, announced his intention to resign; the announcement followed Trump's cancellation of a meeting with end-users of steel and aluminum that Cohn had arranged in an attempt to dissuade the president from the planned tariffs.

A March 2018 Quinnipiac University poll showed widespread disapproval of the tariffs, with only 29% of Americans agreeing with a "25% tariff on steel imports and a 10% tariff on aluminum imports" if it raised their cost of living.

On June 13, 2019, 661 American companies sent a letter to Trump urging him to resolve the trade dispute with China. The letter was one of many sent on behalf of Tariffs Hurt the Heartland, an organization of over 150 trade groups representing agriculture, manufacturing, retailing and technology companies.

=== Chinese products ===
U.S. trade deficit, in billions, goods only, by country, 2014

On March 22, 2018, Trump signed a memorandum under the Section 301 of the Trade Act of 1974, instructing the United States Trade Representative (USTR) to apply tariffs of $50 billion on Chinese goods. Trump said the tariffs would be imposed due to Chinese theft of U.S. intellectual property. Trump said his planned tariffs on Chinese imports would make the United States "a much stronger, much richer nation". However, the steps toward imposing the tariffs led to increased concerns of a global trade war.

The Dow Jones Industrial Average fell 724 points, or 2.9%, after the tariffs were announced due to concerns over a trade war. Corporations that traded with China, such as Caterpillar Inc. and Boeing, suffered large losses in their stock price.

In response, the Ministry of Commerce of China announced plans to implement its own tariffs on 128 U.S. products. 120 of those products, such as fruit and wine, will be taxed at a 15% duty while the remaining eight products, including pork, will receive a 25% tariff. China implemented their tariffs on April 2, 2018.

On April 3, 2018, the U.S. Trade Representative's office published an initial list of 1,300+ Chinese goods to impose levies upon, including products like flat-screen televisions, weapons, satellites, medical devices, aircraft parts and batteries. Chinese Ambassador Cui Tiankai responded by warning the U.S. that they may fight back, saying "We have done the utmost to avoid this kind of situation, but if the other side makes the wrong choice, then we have no alternative but to fight back."

On April 4, 2018, China's Customs Tariff Commission of the State Council decided to announce a plan of additional tariffs of 25% on 106 items of products including automobiles, airplanes, and soybeans. Soybeans are the top U.S. agricultural export to China.

The increased tit-for-tat tariff announcements stoked fears that the two countries are inching closer to a trade war. On April 4, 2018, President Trump responded to speculation tweeting: "We are not in a trade war with China, that war was lost many years ago by the foolish, or incompetent, people who represented the U.S. Now we have a Trade Deficit of $500 Billion a year, with Intellectual Property Theft of another $300 Billion. We cannot let this continue!" The next day Trump directed the USTR to consider $100 billion in additional tariffs.

On May 9, 2018, China cancelled soybean orders exported from United States to China. Zhang Xiaoping, Chinese director for the U.S. Soybean Export Council, said Chinese buyers simply stopped buying from the U.S.

On June 15, Donald Trump released a list of $34 billion of Chinese goods to face a 25% tariff, starting on July 6. Another list with $16 billion of Chinese goods was released, with an implementation date of August 23.

On July 10, the United States Trade Representative, in reaction to China's retaliatory tariffs that took effect July 6, requested comments, gave notice of public hearings and issued a proposed list of Chinese products amounting to an annual trade value of about $200 billion that would be subjected to an additional 10% in duties on top of what those imported articles would normally pay.

In 2018 China ended its domestic ownership rules for auto companies and financial institutions. The rules required that auto companies and financial institutions in China be at least 50 percent owned by Chinese companies. The change was seen as benefitting U.S. auto companies including Tesla.

On May 9, 2019, Trump said the tariffs are "paid for mostly by China, by the way, not by us." Economic analysts concluded this was an incorrect assertion as American businesses and consumers ultimately pay the tariffs as real-world examples of tariffs working as intended are rare, and consumers of the tariff-levying country are the primary victims of tariffs, by having to pay higher prices. "It is inaccurate to say that countries pay tariffs on commercial and consumer goods—it is the buyers and sellers that bear the costs," said Ross Burkhart, a Boise State University political scientist. "Purchasers pay the tariff when they buy popular products. Sellers lose market share when their products get priced out of markets," Burkhart added.

During the June 2019 G20 Osaka summit, China and America agreed to resume stalled trade talks, with Trump announcing he would suspend an additional $300 billion in tariffs that had been under consideration after talks failed the previous month and asserting China had agreed to buy a "tremendous amount" of American farm products, although there were no specifics or confirmation of this by China. People familiar with the negotiations later said China made no explicit commitment as Trump had described.

=== South Korean products ===
On March 28, 2018, the United States and South Korea announced major changes to the bilateral United States–Korea Free Trade Agreement (KORUS FTA) in response to the numerous tariffs and the proposed North Korean-United States diplomatic meeting. The 25 percent tariff on South Korean trucks will be extended until 2041, adding twenty years to the current 2021 target phase out date. No South Korean auto manufacturer exports trucks to the United States. The United States exempted South Korea from its steel tariffs but imposed an import quota of about 2.68 million tons. South Korea was temporarily exempted from aluminum tariffs as well, but the exemption was removed effective May 1, 2018.

== Retaliatory tariffs ==
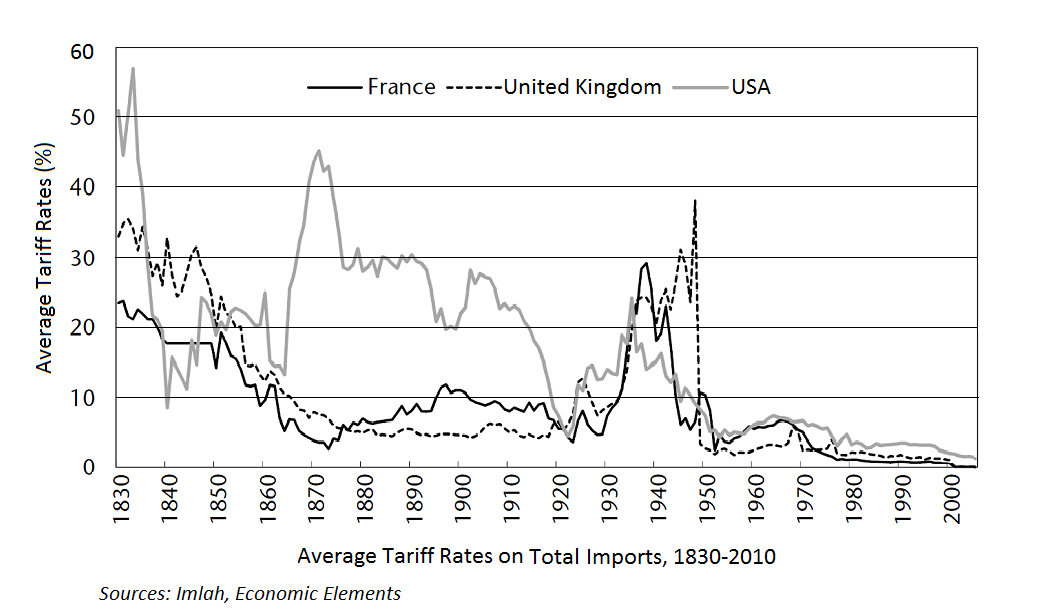
Historical average tariff rates, in France, UK, U.S.

China, Canada, and the European Union responded negatively to the initial announcement (which did not mention any temporary exemptions). Canada supplies 16% of U.S. demand for steel, followed by Brazil at 13%, South Korea at 10%, Mexico at 9%, and China at 2%.

=== Canadian ===
From 2013 to 2016, Canada was the largest source of aluminum imports to the U.S.

Trump invoked national security grounds as justification for imposing steel and aluminum tariffs on Canada. Canadian Prime Minister Justin Trudeau said the idea "that Canada could be considered a national security risk to the United States" was "absurd" and "inconceivable" and called the tariffs "totally unacceptable". Trudeau announced $16.6 billion in retaliatory tariffs, saying "American people are not the target ... We hope eventually that common sense will triumph. Unfortunately the actions taken today by the United States government do not appear headed in that direction."

On July 1, 2018, Canada implemented retaliatory tariffs on U.S. imports. The value of the Canadian tariffs were set to match the value of the U.S. tariffs dollar-for-dollar and cover 299 U.S. goods, including steel, aluminum, and a variety of other products, including inflatable boats, yogurt, whiskies, candles, and sleeping bags before the tariffs were lifted on May 20, 2019.

=== Chinese ===
The Chinese government placed retaliatory tariffs on U.S. goods. China threatened to curb imports of U.S. soybeans.

A June 2019 analysis conducted by the Peterson Institute for International Economics found that China had imposed the same 8% average tariffs on all countries in January 2018, but by June 2019 average tariffs on American exports had increased to 20.7% while those on other countries had declined to 6.7%

=== European ===
Jean-Claude Juncker, the president of the European Commission, condemned U.S. steel and aluminum tariffs and announced that a legal challenge at the World Trade Organization would follow. The EU filed the WTO challenge against the United States on June 1, once the tariffs took effect.

Retaliatory tariffs from the European Union took effect on June 22, 2018, imposing tariffs on 180 types of products, in total worth over $3 billion of U.S. goods. Affected products include steel and aluminum, agricultural goods (including orange juice and cranberry juice), clothing, washing machines, cosmetics, and boats. European Commissioner for Trade Cecilia Malmström stated: "The rules of international trade, which we have developed ... with our American partners, cannot be violated without a reaction from our side. Our response is measured, proportionate and fully in line with WTO rules." Among the U.S. manufacturers affected by the EU's responsive tariffs is Harley-Davidson, which announced that it would move some of their manufacturing out of the United States. Another is the James E. Pepper whiskey distillery in Kentucky, which, due to raised prices, lost most of its foreign business; as of mid-2021, the business had not recovered.

The ongoing conflict between American aircraft manufacturer Boeing and European manufacturer Airbus over government subsidies had been going on for more than two decades. After the World Trade Organization gave the U.S. a green light to impose tariffs because of subsidies from the governments of Spain, France, Germany, and the United Kingdom to Airbus, European Commission spokesperson Daniel Rosario threatened retaliatory measures if the United States imposes a US$7.5 billion (€6.823 billion) tariff on products such as olives, whiskey, wine, cheese, yogurt, and airplanes. The tariffs were in addition to those imposed in 2018. As of October 18, 2019 they were in effect.

Under President Joe Biden, the United States embarked on an effort to settle several trade disputes with allies, including both ones originating under President Trump and longer-standing ones. The United States and the European Union announced on October 31, 2021, in a joint statement that tariffs on steel and aluminum would be lifted under a certain volume and replaced by bilateral tariff-rate quotas that would allow for historical volumes of trade. European tariffs on American metal and iconic American exports would also end and further European retaliatory tariffs that would be implemented on December 1 were forestalled. The steel and aluminum have to be entirely produced in the EU to qualify for duty-free status.

A similar system of duty-free quotas was announced on March 22, 2022, for steel and aluminum products from the United Kingdom within historical volumes. An audit regime was agreed upon for Chinese-owned steel companies. In return British retaliatory tariffs would be lifted. The United States announced a suspension for the duration of one year placed on tariffs on Ukrainian steel on May 9, 2022, in view of the Russian invasion of Ukraine.

=== Indian ===
On June 16, 2019, India imposed retaliatory tariffs on 28 U.S. products, $240 million (~$298 million in 2025) worth of goods, with some levies reaching 70 percent. Affected products include apples, almonds, walnuts, lentils, and some chemical products; India is the largest buyer of U.S. almonds, paying $543 million for more than half of the imports. It's also the second-largest buyer of U.S. apples, buying $156 million (~$197 million in 2025) worth in 2018. The tariffs were in response to the U.S.'s refusal to exempt India from higher tariffs on steel and aluminum imports and in response to the U.S. withdrawing India from the Generalized System of Preferences on June 5. India had announced retaliatory tariff increases totaling $235 million (~$296 million in 2025) on U.S. goods in June 2018, but trade talks had delayed their implementation.

=== Mexican ===
In response to the imposition of U.S. tariffs, Mexico implemented retaliatory tariffs on around US$3 billion (MXN $58.6 billion) worth of U.S. goods. These Mexican tariffs, which went into effect on June 5, 2018, were imposed on U.S. steel, pork, cheese, whiskey, and apples, among other goods before being lifted on May 20, 2019.

== Proposed ==
=== Automobiles ===
During his first successful presidential campaign, Trump said he would impose tariffs—between 15 and 35%—on companies that moved their operations to Mexico. Trump proposed a 35% tariff on "every car, every truck and every part manufactured in Ford's Mexico plant that comes across the border". Tariffs at that level would be far higher than the international norms (which are around 2.67% for the U.S. and most other advanced economies and under 10% for most developing countries). After the European Union threatened to impose retaliatory tariffs should a tariff on steel and aluminum be imposed, on March 3, 2018, Trump countered with a threat to impose tariffs on European car manufacturers. In May 2019, Trump threatened to impose tariffs of up to 25 percent on automobiles and parts on the basis that a weakening internal U.S. economy constituted a national security threat, but delayed the imposition of the tariffs for six months to allow for trade talks with the European Union and Japan.

=== All Mexican imports ===
On May 30, 2019, Trump unexpectedly announced that he would impose a 5% tariff on all imports from Mexico on June 10, increasing to 10% on July 1, and by another 5% each month for three months, "until such time as illegal migrants coming through Mexico, and into our Country, STOP." Hours later, Republican senator Chuck Grassley, chairman of the Senate Finance Committee, commented, "This is a misuse of presidential tariff authority and counter to congressional intent. Following through on this threat would seriously jeopardize passage of USMCA, a central campaign pledge of President Trump's and what could be a big victory for the country." That same day, the Trump administration formally initiated the process to seek congressional approval of USMCA.

Trump's top trade advisor, US Trade Representative Robert Lighthizer, opposed the new Mexican tariffs on concerns it would jeopardize passage of USMCA. Treasury secretary Steven Mnuchin and Trump senior advisor Jared Kushner also opposed the action. Grassley, whose committee is instrumental in passing USMCA, was not informed in advance of Trump's surprise announcement. An array of lawmakers and business groups expressed consternation about the proposed tariffs. With 2018 imports of Mexican goods totaling $346.5 billion, a 5% tariff constitutes a tax increase of over $17 billion.

On the evening of June 7, Trump announced that the planned Mexico tariffs were "indefinitely suspended" after Mexico agreed to take stronger measures to curb immigration across the border of the U.S. According to the deal, Mexico agreed to deploy 6,000 of its National Guard troops throughout the country, with a focus on its southern border with Guatemala. Mexico also agreed to house migrants seeking asylum in the U.S.—including housing, offering jobs, health care and education—while the U.S. agreed to accelerate asylum claims. If the deal does not have the "expected results", then the two nations will meet again in 90 days. Trump also tweeted that Mexico had agreed to "immediately" begin buying agricultural products from U.S. farmers, although the communique between the countries did not mention any such deal and Mexican officials were reportedly not aware of such discussions; American officials declined to comment.

The New York Times reported the next day that Mexico had already agreed to most of the actions months prior. On June 9, as critics continued to downplay the significance of the deal, Trump called The New York Times report "false", tweeting "We have been trying to get some of these Border Actions for a long time ... but were not able to get them, or get them in full, until our signed agreement with Mexico." The Times stood by its reporting. Trump also threatened that he could return to using tariffs as a tactic if desired. Mexico's ambassador to the U.S., Martha Bárcena Coqui, addressed Trump's defense of the deal on CBS, saying "There are a lot of details that we discussed during the negotiations ... that we didn't put into the declaration because there are different paths that we have to follow," adding that adjustments will be made as the situation on the border evolves.

== Effects ==
The Trump administration's tariffs were panned by the majority of economists and analysts, with general consensus among experts—including U.S. Director of the National Economic Council Larry Kudlow—being that the tariffs either had no direct benefits on the U.S. economy and GDP growth or they had a small to moderately negative impact on the economy. In a March 2018 Reuters survey, almost 80% of 60 economists believed the tariffs on steel and aluminum imports would be a net harm to the U.S. economy, with the rest believing the tariffs would have little or no effect; none of the economists surveyed believed the tariffs would benefit the U.S. economy. In May 2018, more than 1,000 economists wrote a letter warning Trump about the dangers of pursuing a trade war, arguing that the tariffs were echoing historical policy errors, such as the Smoot–Hawley Tariff Act, which helped lead to the Great Depression.

=== Economic ===
Many companies passed the costs of the Trump tariffs on to consumers in the form of higher prices. Following impositions of the tariffs on Chinese goods, the prices of U.S. intermediate goods rose by 10% to 30%, an amount generally equivalent to the size of the tariffs.

A study published in fall 2019 in the Journal of Economic Perspectives found that by December 2018, Trump's tariffs resulted in a reduction in aggregate U.S. real income of $1.4 billion per month in deadweight losses, and cost U.S. consumers an additional $3.2 billion per month in added tax. The study's authors noted that these were conservative measures of the losses from the tariffs, because they did not take account of the tariffs' effects in reducing the variety of products available to consumers, or the tariff-related costs attributable to policy uncertainty or the fixed costs incurred by companies to reorganize their global supply chains. A study by Federal Reserve Board economists found that the tariffs reduced employment in the American manufacturing sector.

An April 2019 working paper by economists found that the tariffs on washing machines caused the prices of washers to increase by approximately twelve percent in the United States. A 2019 paper by Federal Reserve Board economists found that the steel tariffs led to 0.6% fewer jobs in the manufacturing sector than would have happened in the absence of the tariffs; this amounted to approximately 75,000 jobs.

In May 2019, analyses from varying organizations were released. A May 2019 Goldman Sachs analysis found that the consumer price index (CPI) for tariffed goods had increased dramatically, compared to a declining CPI for all other core goods. A CNBC analysis that month found that Trump had "enacted tariffs equivalent to one of the largest tax increases in decades," while Tax Foundation and Tax Policy Center analyses found the tariffs could offset the benefits of the Tax Cuts and Jobs Act of 2017 for many households. The Tax Foundation found that if all existing and proposed tariffs were fully implemented, the benefits of the Trump tax cut would be eliminated for all taxpayers through the 90th percentile in earnings.

Another May 2019 analysis conducted by the National Taxpayers Union warned that the existing and proposed additional tariffs, if fully implemented, would constitute the largest tax increase of the post-war era. According to an analysis by Peterson Institute for International Economics economists, American businesses and consumers paid more than $900,000 a year for each job that was created or saved as a result of the Trump administration's tariffs on steel and aluminum. The cost for each job saved as a result of the administration's tariffs on washing machines was $815,000.

Analysis conducted by Deutsche Bank estimated that Trump's trade actions had resulted in foregone American stock market capitalization of $5 trillion through May 2019.

A September 2019 Federal Reserve study found that tariffs Trump imposed through mid-2019, combined with the policy uncertainty they created, would reduce the 2020 real GDP growth rate by one percentage point.

A study by four economists published in October 2019 by the Quarterly Journal of Economics estimated that U.S. consumers and firms who buy imports lost $51 billion (0.27% of GDP) as a result of the 2018 tariffs. After accounting for increases in government tariff revenue and gains to U.S. producers, the study authors estimated the aggregate U.S. real income loss to be $7.2 billion (0.04% of GDP). The study found that "retaliatory tariffs resulted in a 9.9% decline in U.S. exports within products." The study also found that workers in heavily Republican counties suffered the most from the trade war, because retaliatory tariffs focused on agricultural products.

Between the time Trump took office in 2017 through March 2019, the U.S.'s trade deficit grew by $119 billion, reaching $621 billion, the highest it had been since 2008. As of January 2020, the Trump administration had imposed tariffs on 16.8% of all goods imported into the U.S. (measured as a share of the value of all U.S. imports in 2017). The Congressional Budget Office (CBO) published its estimate of the U.S. economic impact from Trump's trade policies:

In CBO's estimation, the trade barriers put in place by the United States and its trading partners between January 2018 and January 2020 would reduce real GDP over the projection period. The effects of those barriers on trade flows, prices, and output are projected to peak during the first half of 2020 and then begin to subside. Tariffs are expected to reduce the level of real GDP by roughly 0.5 percent and raise consumer prices by 0.5 percent in 2020. As a result, tariffs are also projected to reduce average real household income by $1,277 (in 2019 dollars) in 2020. CBO expects the effect of trade barriers on output and prices to diminish over time as businesses continue to adjust their supply chains in response to the changes in the international trading environment.

A 2021 study by Oxford Economics and the U.S.-China Business Council concluded that the United States lost 245,000 jobs as a result of the Trump tariffs.

According to the Budget Lab at Yale University, American consumer prices could rise by 1.4% to 5.1% if Trump implements his comprehensive tariff plan, which would amount to an additional $1,900 to $7,600 per household.

==== Effects on China–U.S. trade ====
Trump announced on August 1, 2019, that he would impose a 10% tariff on $300 billion of Chinese imports beginning September 1; four days later the Chinese Commerce Ministry announced that China was halting imports of all American agricultural goods. American Farm Bureau Federation data showed that agriculture exports to China fell from $19.5 billion in 2017 to $9.1 billion in 2018, a 53% decline. The figure was $21.4 billion (~$28.1 billion in 2025) in 2016.

A study by Samantha Vortherms and Jiakun Jack Zhang concluded that less than 1% of the increase in U.S. enterprises leaving China in 2018 and 2019 resulted from the tariffs and that U.S. enterprises were no more likely to divest from China than they were to divest from other Asian countries or Europe.

The Trump tariffs, along with the impacts of COVID-19, were a major factor in declining trade between China and the U.S. in 2019 and 2020. Trade between the two countries subsequently rebounded significantly, and as of 2021 merchandise trade was down only marginally from its record high in 2018.

In 2021, a survey of U.S. enterprises operating in China showed that two-thirds of them were optimistic about the Chinese market and planned to increase their investments in China.

=== Political ===
Studies have found that the tariffs adversely affected Republican candidates in elections. A study by the University of Warwick's economists found that the tariffs negatively impacted the electorate in districts that swung to Trump (relative to Mitt Romney's 2012 performance), and that as a result of the retaliatory tariffs, Republican candidates fared worse by between 1.4 and 2.7 percentage points in counties in the top decile of the exposure distribution implied by the Chinese, Canadian and Mexican retaliation. The analysis also found that the retaliatory tariffs implemented by the EU were carefully structured so as to not harm the EU itself, whereas China implemented tariffs that harmed industries both in China and in the U.S. A 2021 study found that Chinese retaliatory tariffs systematically targeted Republican counties in swing congressional districts, and that voters in such counties became more aware of the trade war, its adverse impact, and that they assigned Republicans responsibility for escalating the trade dispute.

The Asian Trade Centre argued that Trump's usage of trade policy as a tactic to push non-trade related political initiatives, particularly his May 2019 threat to levy Mexican imports until they crackdown on illegal immigration, set a negative precedent for future U.S. presidents and damaged the credibility of the U.S. as a reliable trade partner.

== Successive Trump tariffs ==
During his 2024 campaign, Trump repeatedly talked about imposing tariffs. After he won the 2024 United States presidential election, many companies responded by preparing for the possible tariffs.

In late November 2024, Trump pledged to impose a 25% tariff on Canada and Mexico, citing drug trafficking and "Illegal Aliens", as well as a 10% tariff on Chinese goods by February 20th.

Mexico President Claudia Sheinbaum stated that the tariffs would not solve problems with immigration. According to a spokesperson for the Chinese embassy, trade with China is mutually beneficial, and that they have taken action on issues before.

On November 30, 2024, Trump suggested implementing 100% tariffs on BRICS nations if they try to compete with the U.S. dollar.

=== Canada ===
After Trump won the 2024 election, he announced a plan to impose a 25% tariff on all imports from Canada as soon as he took office. This decision poses significant risks to the deep economic ties between the U.S. and Canada, where goods worth $3.6 billion cross the border daily. Trump's aim with the tariffs is to push Canada and Mexico to take stronger actions against migration and drug trafficking, while also supporting his "Buy American" agenda to boost the U.S. economy. If implemented, these tariffs could drastically alter North America's economic landscape.

Canadian Prime Minister Justin Trudeau stated he would retaliate against any tariffs on Canadian goods, while Ontario Premier Doug Ford threatened to cut electricity exports to the US. Quebec Premier Francois Legault and Alberta Premier Danielle Smith spoke against engaging in retaliatory tariffs. In December 2024, the Canadian government proposed a series of measures to improve surveillance of the Canada-U.S. border, seeking to allay Trump's concerns about illegal immigration and drug trafficking. The Canadian government has allocated $1.3 billion for border measures, which includes an aerial intelligence task force and a joint strike force. These measures, seen as solutions to problems that may not exist, have drawn skepticism since Trump's claims about illegal migration and fentanyl imports are exaggerated.

Ivey Business School professor Andreas Schotter stated tariffs would likely breach the United States–Mexico–Canada Agreement (USMCA), which promotes free trade between member nations. Such tariffs would need extensive justification, likely facing legal challenges from Canada and Mexico. Trump could use the threat of tariffs to negotiate changes to the USMCA before its 2026 renewal.

== See also ==
- Tariffs in the second Trump administration
- History of tariffs in the United States
- List of tariff laws in the United States
- Protectionism in the United States
- China–United States trade war
- List of the largest trading partners of the United States
- List of the largest trading partners of China
- List of largest trading partners of India
