= Graduate School of Arts and Sciences =

Graduate School of Arts and Sciences may refer to:

- Boston College Graduate School of Arts & Sciences
- Brandeis University Graduate School of Arts and Sciences
- College of William & Mary Graduate School of Arts and Sciences
- Columbia Graduate School of Arts and Sciences
- Fordham Graduate School of Arts and Sciences
- Georgetown University Graduate School of Arts and Sciences
- Harvard Graduate School of Arts and Sciences
- New York University Graduate School of Arts and Science
- Yale Graduate School of Arts and Sciences
