= GITAM School of Architecture =

- GSA
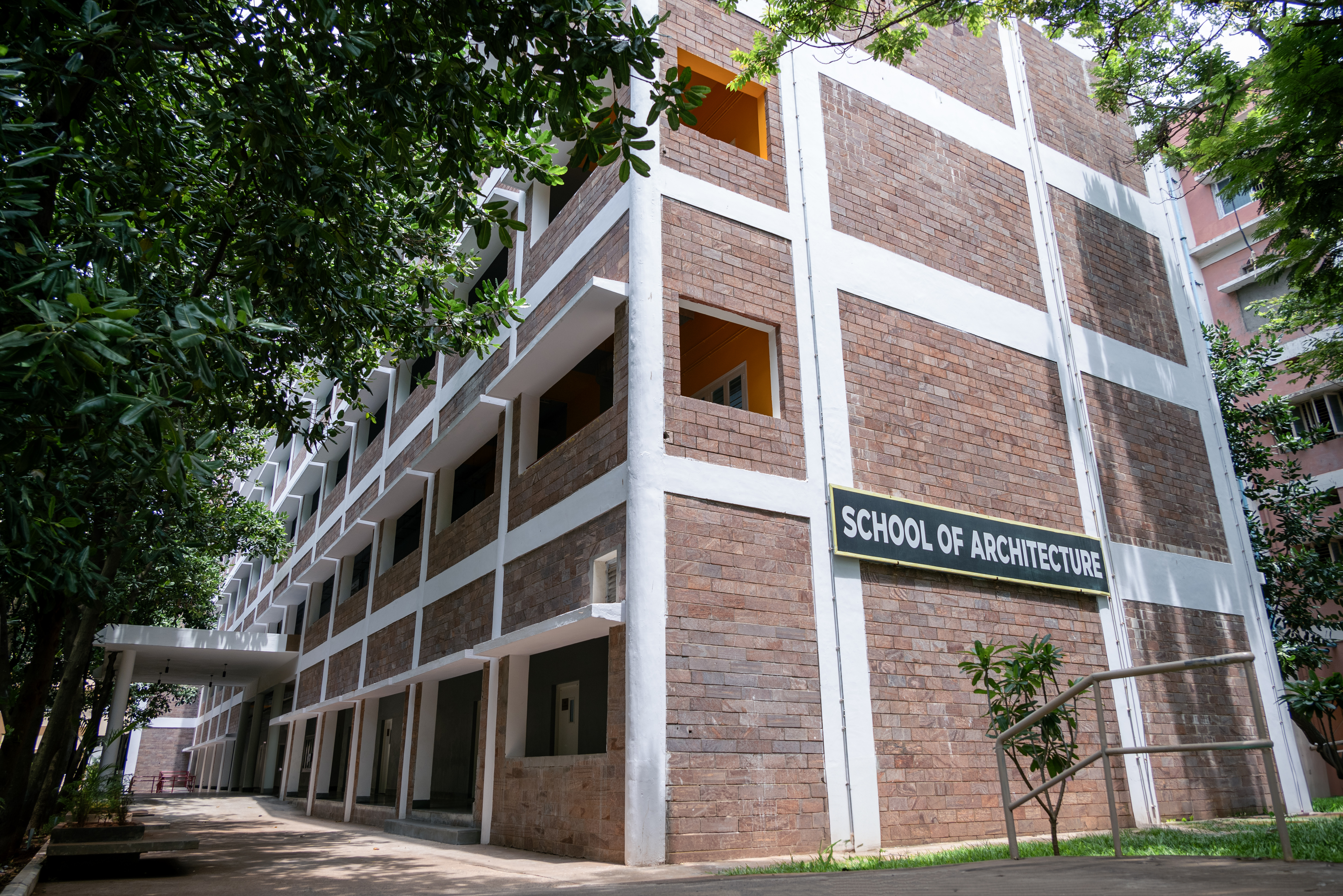
- Architecture School
- Type: Private University
- Established: 2011
- Parent institution: GITAM University
- Accreditation: Council of Architecture
- Affiliations: Indian Institute of Architects, National Association of Students of Architecture, INTACH, IGBC
- Dean: Prof. Dr. Vibhuti Sachdev
- Faculty: 25 full-time, 16 visiting
- Students: 250
- Location: Visakhapatnam, Andhra Pradesh, India
- Campus: Urban
- Website: https://gsa.gitam.edu/

The GITAM School of Architecture, Visakhapatnam (GSA) is a constituent institute of Gandhi Institute of Technology and Management located in Visakhapatnam, India, specializing education and research in the field of architecture. It was established in 2011.

== Academics ==
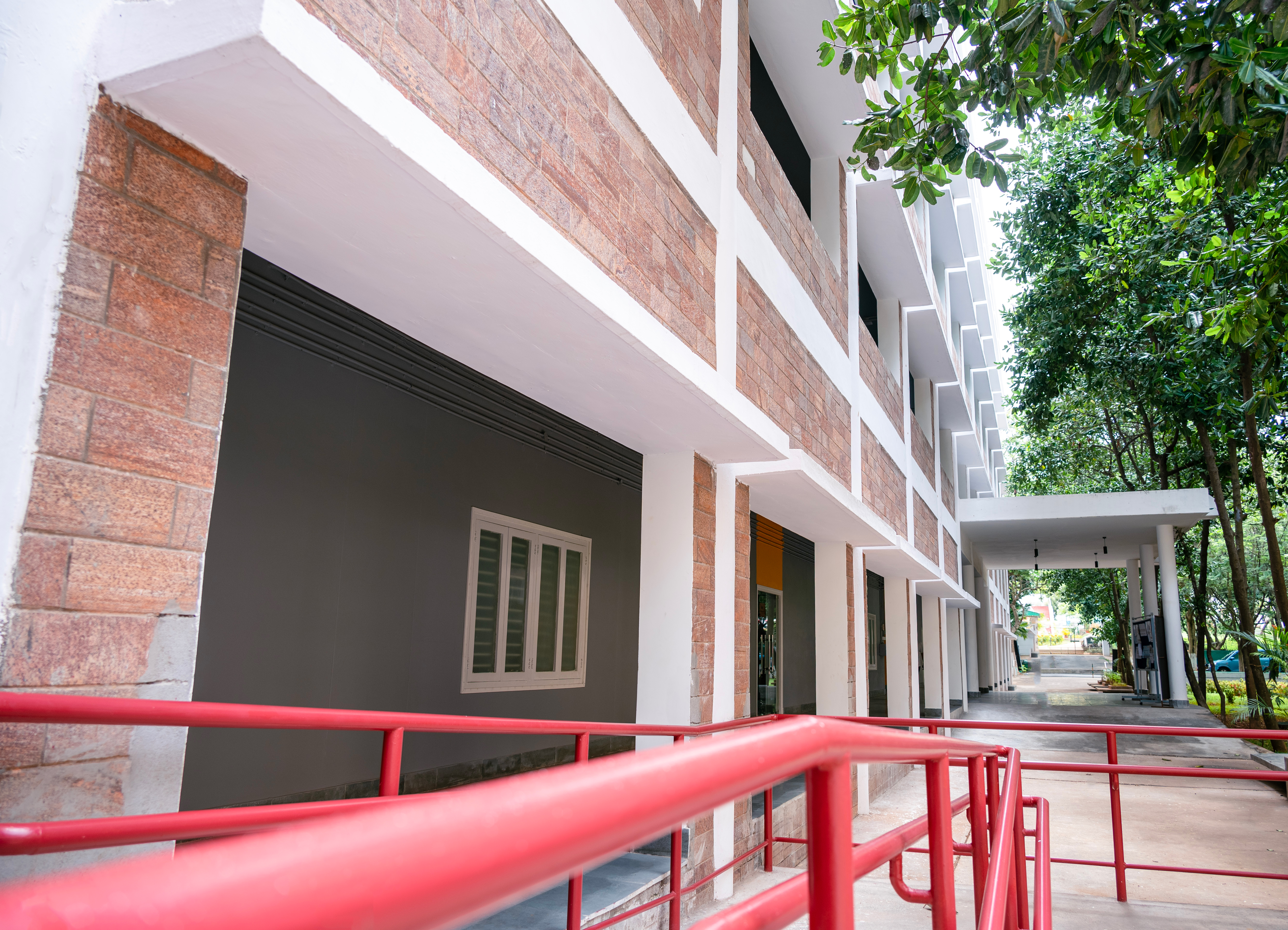
GSA School

It offers Bachelor of Architecture (B. Arch.) and Master of Architecture (M. Arch.) and a PhD Programme.

== Admission ==
Admissions to the undergraduate programme is through the Joint Entrance Examination (JEE) or NATA conducted by the Council of Architecture. Foreign nationals, non-resident Indians (NRIs) and persons of Indian origin (PIOs) candidates are eligible to apply and should have qualifications from the foreign boards/universities recognized as equivalent by the Association of Indian Universities (AIU) to be shortlisted for further evaluations.

== Facilities ==
At GITAM, we are committed to providing good infrastructure that supports the diverse needs of our architecture students. Our facilities are designed to foster innovation and hands-on learning, preparing students to excel in the architecture profession. Our Facilities include Maker Space including 3D Printing and Laser cutting machines, Materials Museum, M.Arch resource center, Gallery, Digital Lab, Image Lab, Climatology Lab, Library and Cafe.

The Campus provides modern and well-equipped hostel facilities, student dinning, knowledge resource center, sports, gym and medical facilities.

== See also ==
- List of institutions of higher education in Andhra Pradesh
- School of Planning and Architecture, Vijayawada
- Ministry of Human Resource Development
