= 2002 United States steel tariff =

Tariff on imported steel by US president

On March 5, 2002, U.S. President George W. Bush placed tariffs on imported steel. The tariffs took effect March 20 and were lifted by Bush on December 4, 2003. Research shows that "the costs of the Safeguard Measures [steel tariffs] outweighed their benefits in terms of aggregate GDP and employment". A 2025 study found that the tariffs "did not boost local steel employment but substantially depressed local employment in steel-consuming industries for many years after Bush removed them."

== The tariff ==
The temporary tariffs of 8–30% were originally scheduled to remain in effect until 2005. They were imposed to give U.S. steel makers protection from what a U.S. probe determined was a detrimental surge in steel imports. More than 30 steel makers had filed for bankruptcy in recent years. Steel producers had originally sought up to a 40% tariff. Canada and Mexico were exempt from the tariffs because of penalties the United States would face under the North American Free Trade Agreement (NAFTA). Additionally, some other countries such as Argentina, Thailand, and Turkey were also exempt. The typical steel tariff at the time was usually between zero and one percent, making the 8–30% rates seem exceptionally high. These rates, though, are comparable to the standard permanent U.S. tariff rates on many kinds of clothes and shoes.

The Bush administration justified the tariffs as a safeguarding response, namely that the US steel industry had to be protected against sudden surges of imports of steel.

== Political response in the United States ==
Both the issuing and the lifting of the tariffs caused controversy in the United States. Some of the president's political opponents, such as Democratic House Representative Dick Gephardt, criticized the plan for not going far enough. For some of the president's conservative allies, imposing the tariff was a step away from Bush's commitment to free trade. Critics also contended that the tariffs would harm consumers and U.S. businesses that relied on steel imports, and would cut more jobs than it would save in the steel industry. Supporters of the tariffs believed that U.S. steel producers were being harmed by a "surge" of steel imports endangering the viability of American steel companies.

There was a widespread belief on all sides of the debate, confirmed by top Bush administration officials, that politics played a role in the decision to impose tariffs. Namely, the steel-producing swing states of Pennsylvania, Ohio and West Virginia would benefit from the tariffs. However, steel-using states, such as Tennessee and Michigan were harmed by the tariffs. The placement of the tariffs was an odd one for Bush, who had signed numerous free trade agreements during his term in office. This was widely believed to be a calculated political decision, insofar as the localities that stood to benefit were marginal ones. Both the George H. W. Bush administration and the Reagan administration also imposed import limits on steel.

A 2005 study found that in coverage of the tariffs in the New York Times and Wall Street Journal, there were more sentences devoted to the negative impacts of steel tariffs than sentences on the benefits. The authors argue that this is consistent with a model whereby "more newspaper space would be devoted to the costs of steel tariffs—which are widely dispersed—than to their benefits—which are narrowly targeted."

== International response ==
The tariffs ignited international controversy as well. Immediately after they were filed, the European Union announced that it would impose retaliatory tariffs on the United States, thus risking the start of a major trade war. To decide whether or not the steel tariffs were fair, a case was filed at the Dispute Settlement Body of the World Trade Organization (WTO). Japan, Korea, China, Taiwan, Switzerland, Brazil and others joined with similar cases.

On November 11, 2003, the WTO came out against the steel tariffs, saying that they had not been imposed during a period of import surge—steel imports had actually dropped a bit during 2001 and 2002—and that the tariffs therefore were a violation of America's WTO tariff-rate commitments. The ruling authorized more than $2 billion in sanctions, the largest penalty ever imposed by the WTO against a member state, if the United States did not quickly remove the tariffs. After receiving the verdict, Bush declared that he would preserve the tariffs. In retaliation, the European Union threatened to counter with tariffs of its own on products ranging from Florida oranges to cars produced in Michigan, with each tariff calculated to likewise hurt the President in a key marginal state. The United States backed down and withdrew the tariffs on December 4.

The early withdrawal of the tariffs also drew political criticism from steel producers and supporters of protectionism. The move was cheered by proponents of free trade and steel importers. When he lifted the tariffs, Bush said, "I took action to give the industry a chance to adjust to the surge in foreign imports and to give relief to the workers and communities that depend on steel for their jobs and livelihoods. These safeguard measures have now achieved their purpose, and as a result of changed economic circumstances it is time to lift them".

== Impact ==
In September 2003, the U.S. International Trade Commission (ITC) examined the economic effects of the Bush 2002 steel tariffs. The economy-wide analysis was designed to focus on the impacts that arose from the relative price changes resulting from the imposition of the tariffs, and estimated that the impact of the tariffs on the U.S. welfare ranged between a gain of $65.6 million (0.0006% of GDP) to a loss of $110.0 million (0.0011% of GDP), "with a central estimate of a welfare loss of $41.6 million." A majority of steel-consuming businesses reported that neither continuing nor ending the tariffs would change employment, international competitiveness, or capital investment.

According to a 2005 review of existing research, all studies on the tariffs "find that the costs of the Safeguard Measures outweighed their benefits in terms of aggregate GDP and employment as well as having an important redistributive impact."

Steel production rose slightly during the period of the tariff. The protection of the steel industry in the United States may have had unintended consequences and perverse effects. A study from 2003 that was paid for by CITAC (Consuming Industries Trade Action Coalition), a trade association of businesses that use raw materials, found that around 200,000 jobs were lost as a result.

The U.S. International Trade Commission noted that although the CITAC study did estimate the impact of changing steel prices, it did not specify how much of the impact was attributable directly to the steel tariffs. The study reported estimated impact, relying on specific assumptions made to make analysis simpler. The ITC also noted that, within the broad definition of "steel-consuming industries" used in the CITAC study, employment actually increased by almost 53,000 between March 2002 and December 2002, and that employment in the same industries had fallen by 281,000 from March to December 2001, prior to the tariffs. On the other hand, the ITC admitted that the authors of the CITAC study had controlled for changes in overall manufacturing employment, and also admitted that the CITAC study's estimate of job loss in the steel-consuming sector was only half that reported by steel-consuming firms themselves in answers to questionnaires sent by the ITC, and only one-fifth that reported by the Bureau of Labor Statistics for the sector during the same period.

== See also ==
- First Trump tariffs beginning 2018
- China–United States trade war
