= Trade and Tariff Act of 1984 =

United States law

- Other short titles: Generalized System of Preferences Renewal Act of 1984; International Trade and Investment Act; Steel Import Stabilization Act; Wine Equity and Export Expansion Act of 1984
- Long title: An Act to amend the trade laws, authorize the negotiation of trade agreements, extend trade preferences, change the tariff treatment with respect to certain articles and for other purposes.
- Nicknames: Omnibus Tariff and Trade Act of 1984
- Enacted by: the 98th United States Congress

Citations
- Public law: Pub. L. 98–573
- Statutes at Large: 98 Stat. 2948

Codification
- Titles amended: 19 U.S.C.: Customs Duties

Legislative history
- Introduced in the House as H.R. 3398 by Sam Gibbons (D–FL) on June 23, 1983; Committee consideration by House Ways and Means, Senate Finance; Passed the House on June 28, 1983 (368-43); Passed the Senate on September 20, 1984 (96-0, in lieu of S.Amdt. 4282); Reported by the joint conference committee on October 4, 1984; agreed to by the House on October 9, 1984 (386-1, in lieu of H.Rept. 1156) and by the Senate on October 9, 1984 (Agreed by Voice Vote); Signed into law by President Ronald Reagan on October 30, 1984

Trade and Tariff Act of 1984 (P.L. 98-573) clarified the conditions under which unfair trade cases under Section 301 of the Trade Act of 1974 (P.L. 93-618) can be pursued. It also provided bilateral trade negotiating authority for the U.S.-Canada Free Trade Agreement and the U.S.-Israel Free Trade Agreement, and set out procedures to be followed for congressional approval of future bilateral trade agreements.

== Enactment ==
The H.R. 3398 bill was sponsored by Democrat Sam Gibbons representing the Florida's 7th congressional district. The Act of Congress was enacted into law by 40th President of the United States Ronald Reagan on October 30, 1984.

== Gatekeeping ==
A key feature of the legislation was its modification of the 1974 Trade Act's Fast track authority, incorporating a "committee gatekeeping" device. Congress opted to adapt the fast-track procedure to possible bilateral free-trade agreements with nations other than Israel.

Going forward, the procedure provided that if a country other than Israel requested free-trade negotiations with the United States, the President would be required to notify two "gatekeeper" committees – the House Ways and Means and the Senate Finance committees – and to consult with those committees for a period of 60 legislative days before giving the statutorily required 90-day notice of his intent to sign an agreement. If neither committee disapproved of the negotiations during this 60-day committee consultation period, any subsequently negotiated agreement would receive fast-track legislative consideration.

The 1984 Act thus greatly increased the influence of Congress in negotiating trade agreements. For example, the 60-day pre-negotiation consultation period with the two committees secured their involvement in the Canada-United States Free Trade Agreement negotiations months before formal talks began, allowing Congress to extract concessions from the President as a condition of letting negotiations proceed.
