= List of burials at Laurel Hill Cemetery =

Laurel Hill Cemetery is a historic garden or rural cemetery established in 1836 in the East Falls neighborhood of Philadelphia, Pennsylvania. The 74-acre grounds contain over 11,000 family lots and more than 33,000 graves, including many notable burials.

== A ==
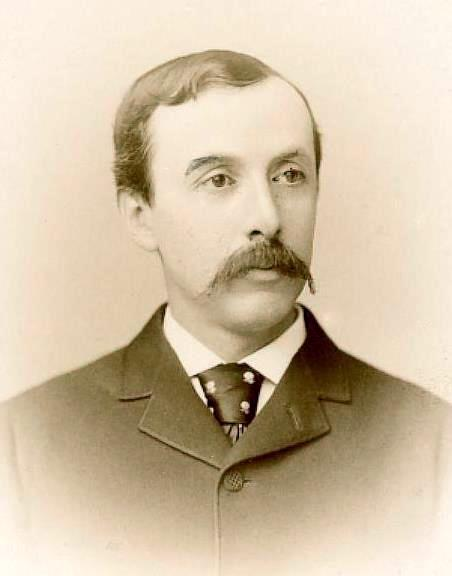
- Robert Adams Jr. served as a Republican Congressman for Philadelphia's 2nd congressional district from 1893 to 1906
  Robert Adams Jr. (1849–1906), U.S. Congressman
- Sara Gwendolen Foulke Andrews (1863-1936), zoologist, marine biologist and poet
- Francis Ayer (1848–1923) advertising businessman, founder N. W. Ayer & Son

== B ==
- Franklin Bache (1792–1864), great-grandson of Benjamin Franklin, chemist, physician
- Hilary Baker (1746–1798), mayor of Philadelphia
- Matthias W. Baldwin (1795–1866), founder of Baldwin Locomotive Works
- John Barker (1746-1818), served in the Revolutionary War, eventually retiring as Major General; three-time mayor of Philadelphia
- James Nelson Barker (1784-1858), playwright, military officer in War of 1812, one-term mayor of Philadelphia, Assistant Comptroller of U.S. Treasury under Martin Van Buren
- Wharton Barker (1846–1921), 1900 Candidate for U.S. President with Populist Party
- Albert Barnes (1798-1870), theologian, clergyman, abolitionist, temperance advocate, and author
- John Rhea Barton (1794–1871), surgeon, namesake of Barton's fracture
- Charles Ezra Beury (1879–1953), banker, 2nd president of Temple University, namesake for Beury Building
- Alexander Biddle (1819–1899), Union Army officer in the U.S. Civil War
- Henry H. Bingham (1841–1912), brevet brigadier general, Medal of Honor recipient
- Robert Montgomery Bird (1803–1854), novelist, playwright, and physician
- David Bispham (1857–1921), opera singer
- George A.H. Blake (1810–1884), cavalry officer in the U.S. Army
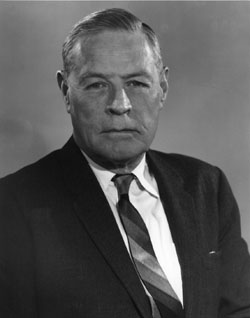
- Charles E. Bohlen was an advisor to every U.S. president from 1943 to 1968
  Charles E. Bohlen (1904–1974), U.S. diplomat
- Francis Bohlen (1868–1942), legal scholar at the University of Pennsylvania
- Henry Bohlen (1810–1862), Civil War Union brigadier general
- George Henry Boker (1823–1890), poet, playwright, and diplomat
- Joseph Bonnell (1802–1840), West Point graduate, hero of the Texas Revolution
- Adolph E. Borie (1809–1880), Secretary of the Navy
- John Bouvier (1781–1851), jurist and legal lexicographer
- Charles Brown (1797–1883), U.S. Congressman
- George Bryan (1731–1791), colonial Pennsylvania businessman and politician

== C ==
- Hampton L. Carson (1852–1929), influential legal scholar and historian
- Lewis C. Cassidy (1829–1889), Pennsylvania State Attorney General
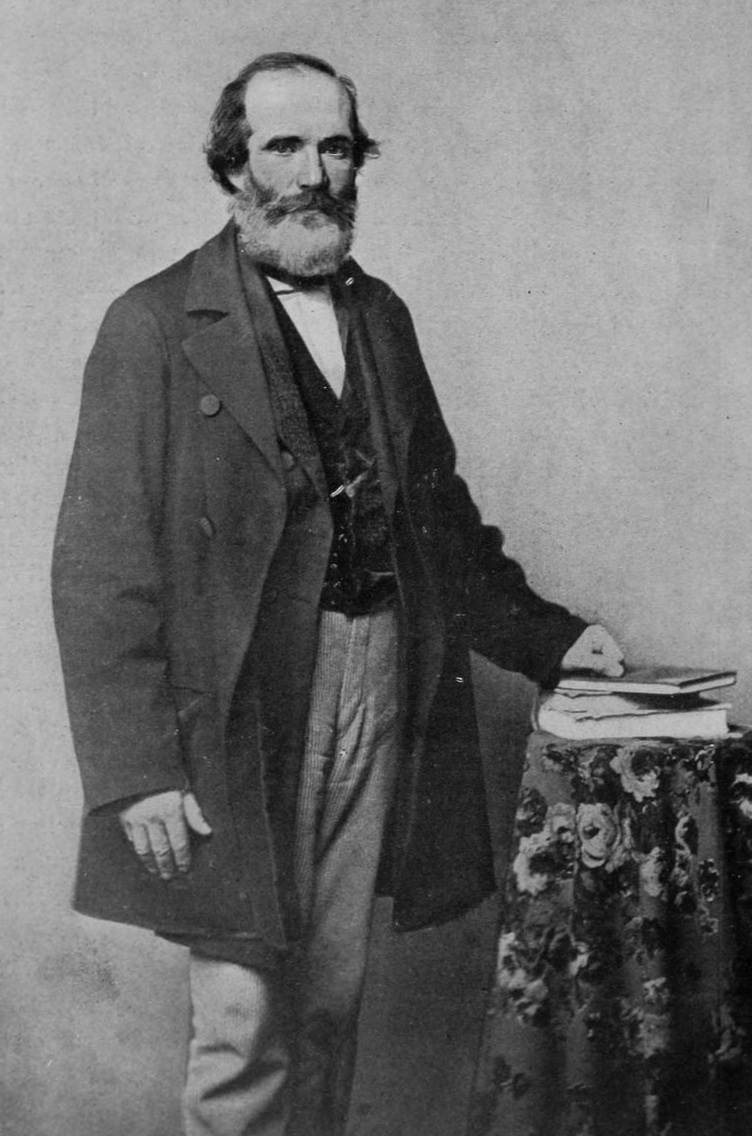
- Five birds are named in honor of the ornithologist John Cassin
  John Cassin (1813–1869), ornithologist
- George William Childs (1829–1894), newspaper publisher
- Thomas Clyde (1812–1885), founder of the Clyde Line of steamers
- William P. Clyde (1839–1923), shipping magnate
- Meredith Colket (1878–1947), Silver Medal winner pole vault, 1900 Summer Olympics
- Walter Colton (1797–1851), Chaplain, Alcalde of Monterey, author, publisher of California's first newspaper
- David Conner (1792–1856), U.S. naval officer
- Robert T. Conrad (1810–1858), mayor of Philadelphia
- Joel Cook (1842–1910), U.S. Congressman
- Robert Cornelius (1809–1893), pioneering photographer, took first selfie in 1839
- Martha Coston (1826–1904), inventor of Coston flare and businesswoman
- Thomas Jefferson Cram (1804–1883), engineer in the U.S. Corps of Topographical Engineers
- Samuel W. Crawford (1829–1892), Civil War Union army general
- Alexander Cummings (1810–1879), third Governor of the Territory of Colorado
- Louisa Knapp Curtis (1851–1910), journalist, editor Ladies' Home Journal, wife of Cyrus H. K. Curtis
- George Hewitt Cushman (1814-1876), engraver and painter of miniature paintings

== D ==
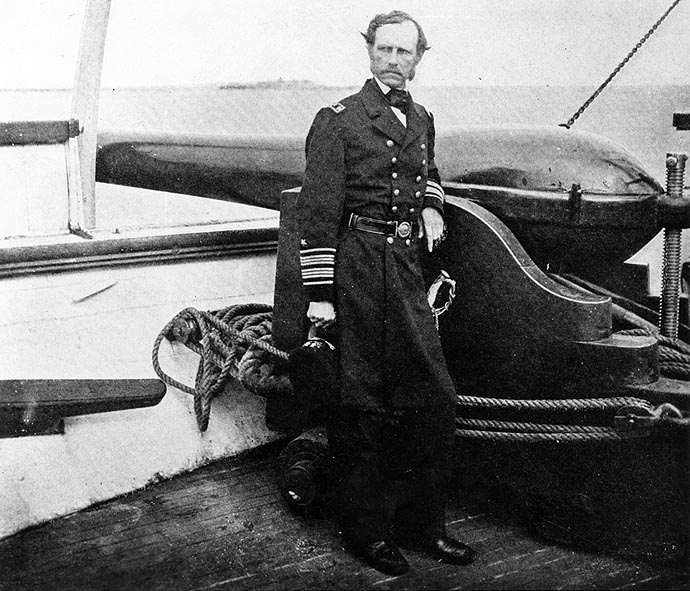
- John A. Dahlgren was a Rear admiral in the Union Navy and invented the Dahlgren gun
  John A. Dahlgren (1809–1870), U.S. naval officer, inventor of the Dahlgren gun
- Ulric Dahlgren (1842–1864), Union Army Captain during the Civil War, namesake of The Dahlgren Affair
- Richard Dale (1756–1826), Revolutionary War naval officer
- Henry Deringer (1786–1868), gunsmith
- Franklin Archibald Dick (1823–1885), attorney, politician and military officer
- Hamilton Disston (1844–1896), industrialist and real-estate developer
- Henry Disston (1819–1878), businessman, Disston Saw Works
- Eleanor Widener Dixon (1891-1966), socialite and philanthropist
- Ida Dixon (1854–1916), socialite, first female golf course architect in the United States
- Percival Drayton (1812–1865), U.S. Navy officer
- William Drayton (1776–1846), politician, banker and writer
- William Duane (1760–1835), journalist
- William Duane (1872–1935), physicist
- William J. Duane (1780–1865), politician, lawyer, United States Secretary of the Treasury in 1833
- Louis Adolphus Duhring (1845–1913), professor of dermatology at University of Pennsylvania, first described dermatitis herpetiformis (Duhring's disease)
- Frank Dumont (1848–1919), minstrel performer and entrepreneur, wrote "The Witmark Amateur Minstrel Guide and Burnt Cork Encyclopedia"
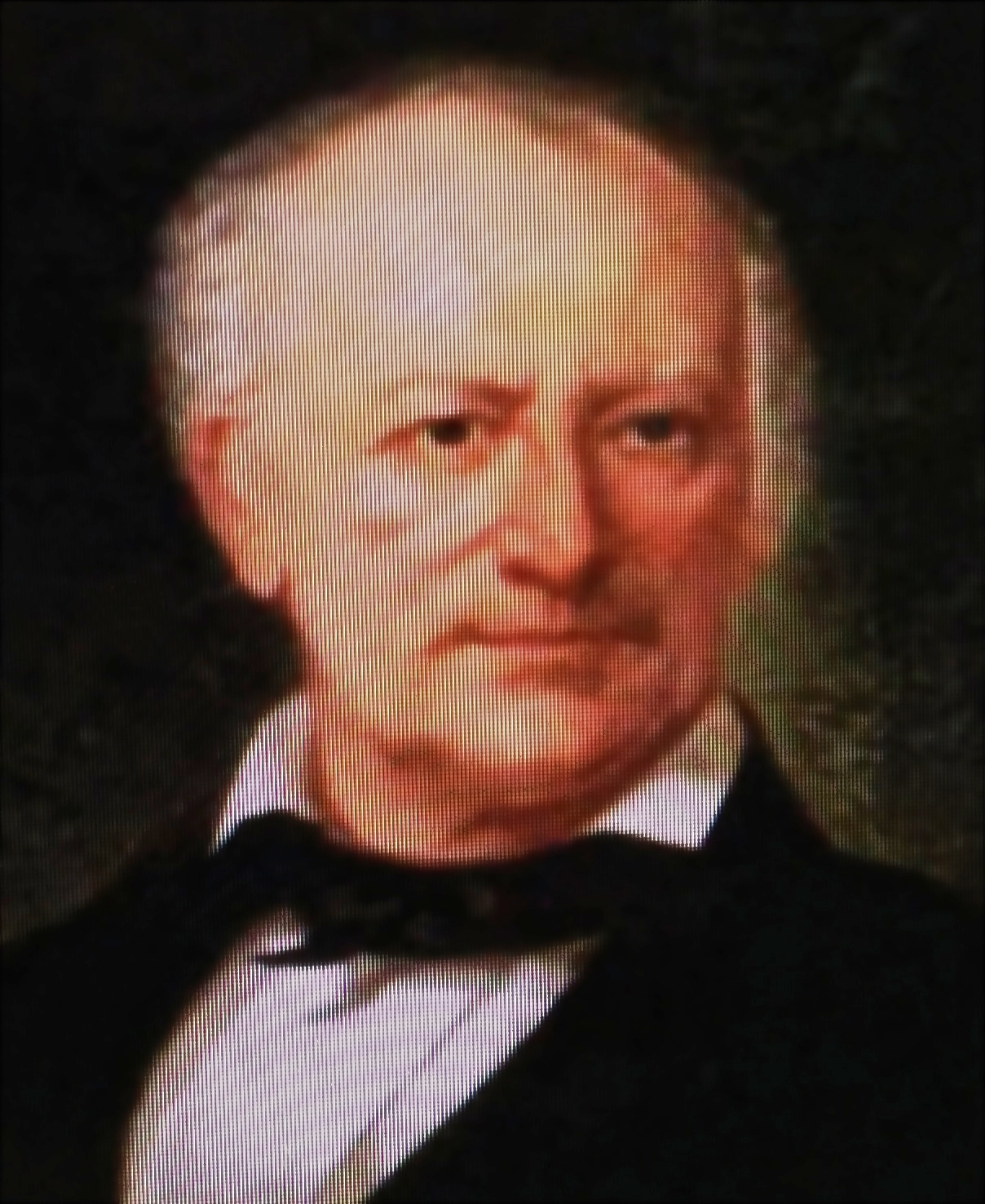
- Stephen Duncan owned the 2nd highest number of slaves in the United States with over 2,200.
  Stephen Duncan (1787–1867), Mississippi planter and banker
- Robley Dunglison, (1798–1869), "Father of American Physiology", personal physician to Thomas Jefferson
- Nathan Dunn (1782–1844), businessman, philanthropist and sinology pioneer
- Elias Durand (1794-1873), French-born pharmacist and botanist, first person to bottle mineral waters in United States
- John Price Durbin (1800–1876), Chaplain of the United States Senate, president of Dickinson College

== E ==
- George Meade Easby (1918–2005), great-grandson of General George Meade and a celebrity figure; owner of haunted Baleroy Mansion
- George Nicholas Eckert (1802–1865), U.S. Congressman
- William Lukens Elkins (1832–1903), businessman, inventor, art collector
- Charles Ellet Jr. (1810–1862), civil engineer
- Charles Rivers Ellet (1843–1863), Colonel in the Union Army during the U.S. Civil War
- Alfred L. Elwyn (1804–1884), physician and pioneer in the education of the mentally disabled; namesake of Elwyn, Pennsylvania
- Jehu Eyre (1738–1781), businessman, veteran of the French and Indian War and American Revolutionary War

== F ==
- Wes Fisler (1841–1922), professional baseball player, nickname "The Icicle"
- Edwin Henry Fitler (1825–1896), 75th mayor of Philadelphia
- Wilmot E. Fleming (1916–1978), Pennsylvania State Representative and Senator
- Robert H. Foerderer (1860–1903), U.S. Congressman
- Stanley Hamer Ford (1877–1961), U.S. Army general, recipient Distinguished Service Medal
- Adam Forepaugh (1831–1890), entrepreneur, businessman, and circus owner
- William Parker Foulke (1816–1865), discovered first full dinosaur skeleton in North America, called Hadrosaurus foulkii in 1858
- Anne Francine (1917–1999), actress and cabaret singer
- John Fries Frazer (1812–1872), Vice Provost of the University of Pennsylvania
- Harriet Whitney Frishmuth (1880–1980), sculptor
- A.B. Frost (1851–1928), illustrator, graphic artist and comics writer
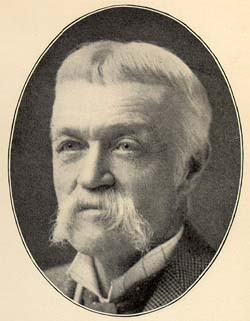
- Frank Furness designed more than 600 buildings and received a Medal of Honor for bravery in the American Civil War
  Frank Furness (1839–1912), architect, Medal of Honor recipient
- Horace Howard Furness (1833–1912), Shakespearean scholar
- William Henry Furness (1802–1896), clergyman, theologian, Transcendentalist, abolitionist, and reformer
- William Henry Furness III (1866–1920), physician, ethnographer and author

== G ==
- Margaret Ralston Gest (1900-1965), painter, member of Philadelphia Ten
- William Evans Garrett Gilmore (1895–1969), Olympic rower 1924 Summer Olympics, 1932 Summer Olympics
- Charles Gilpin (1809–1891), Mayor of Philadelphia, 1851 to 1854
- Henry D. Gilpin (1801–1860), U.S. Attorney General (1840-1841), presented U.S. government's side in the Amistad case
- Joshua Gilpin (1765–1840), paper manufacturer
- George Gliddon (1809–1857), English-born American Egyptologist
- Louis Antoine Godey (1804–1878), editor and publisher Godey's Lady's Book
- Thomas Godfrey (1704–1749), optician and inventor of the octant
- Sylvanus William Godon (1809–1879), U.S. Naval officer (1819-1871)
- Frederick Graff (1775–1847), hydraulic engineer, designer of the Fairmount Water Works
- George Rex Graham (1813–1894), Magazine editor and publisher Graham's Magazine
- Frederick Gutekunst (1831–1917), "Dean of American Photographers"

== H ==
- Henry Schell Hagert (1826–1885), Philadelphia district attorney

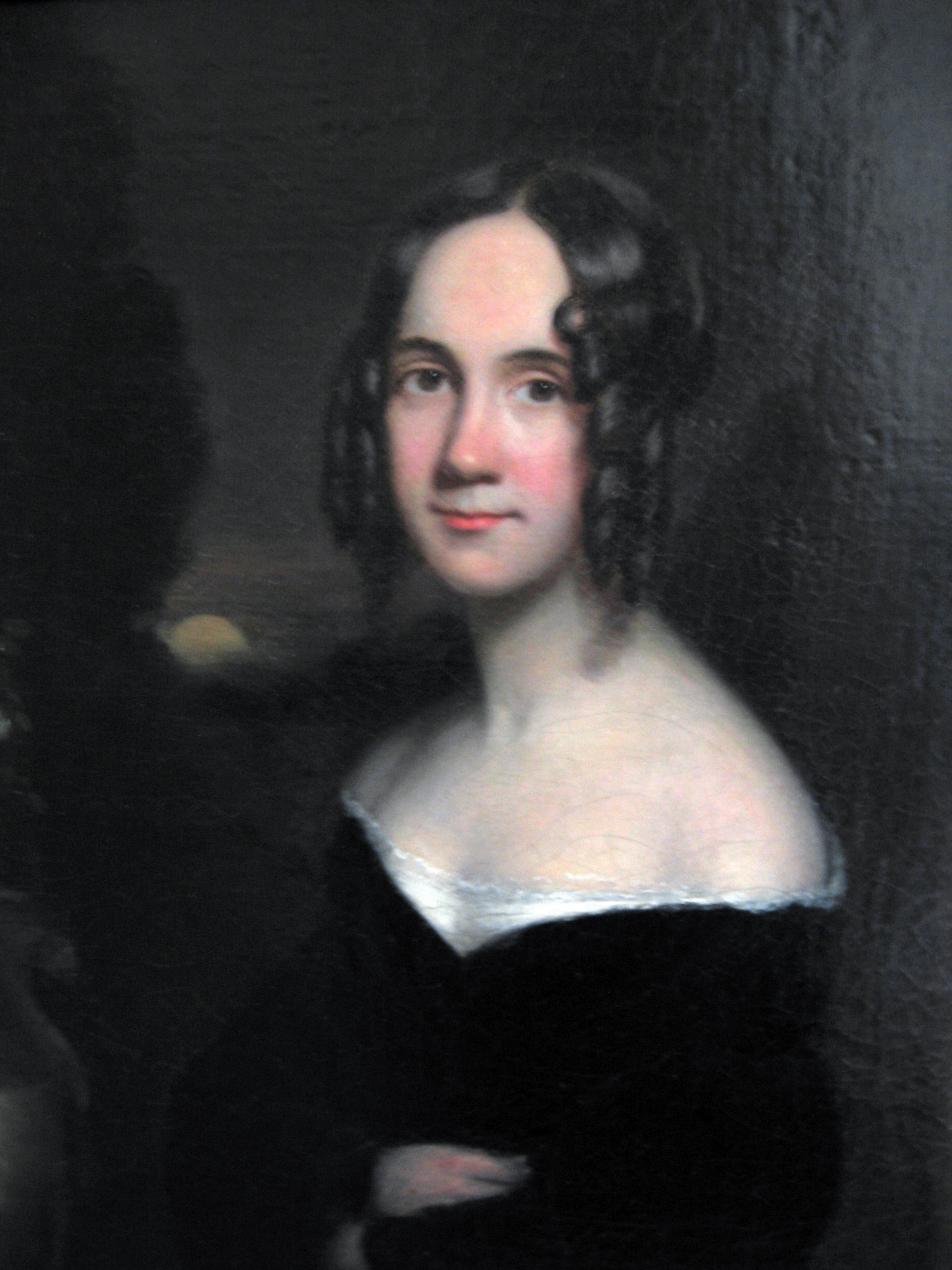
Sarah Josepha Hale was an advocate for making Thanksgiving a national holiday

- Sarah Josepha Hale (1788–1879), writer, poet (Mary Had a Little Lamb), instigator of Thanksgiving as a national holiday
- Anna Hallowell (1831-1905), abolitionist, education reformer
- Frederick Halterman (1831–1907), U.S. Congressman
- James Harper (1780–1873), U.S. Congressman
- Ferdinand Rudolph Hassler (1770–1843), first superintendent of the United States Coast Survey
- A. G. Heaton (1844–1930), artist, author and leading numismatist
- Joseph Hemphill (1770–1842), U.S. Congressman
- Alexander Henry (1823–1883), mayor of Philadelphia from 1858 to 1865
- Henry Beck Hirst (1813–1874), poet, companion of Edgar Allan Poe
- Henry Wilson Hodge (1865–1919), civil engineer Woolworth Building, bridge designer
- Holger Hoiriis (1901-1942), Denmark-born barnstorming pilot, nickname "Hold Your Horses"
- Emily Elizabeth Holman (1854–1925), better known by her professional name of E.E. Holman, she was one of the first female architects in Pennsylvania
- Lucy Hamilton Hooper (1835–1893), poet, journalist, editor and playwright
- Hub (1958–2021), Leonard Nelson Hubbard, bass player for The Roots
- Isaac Hull (1773–1843), Commodore, USN, captained USS Constitution to victory over HMS Guerriere

== J ==
- Caroline Furness Jayne (1873–1909), ethnologist, expert in children's game cat's cradle
- Horace Jayne (1859–1913), zoologist and educator; the Horace Jayne House is on the National Register of Historic Places
- Owen Jones (1819–1878), U.S. Congressman
- James Juvenal (1874–1942), Olympic rower, 1900 Summer Olympics, 1904 Summer Olympics

== K ==
- Harry Kalas (1936–2009), Philadelphia Phillies Hall of Fame broadcaster
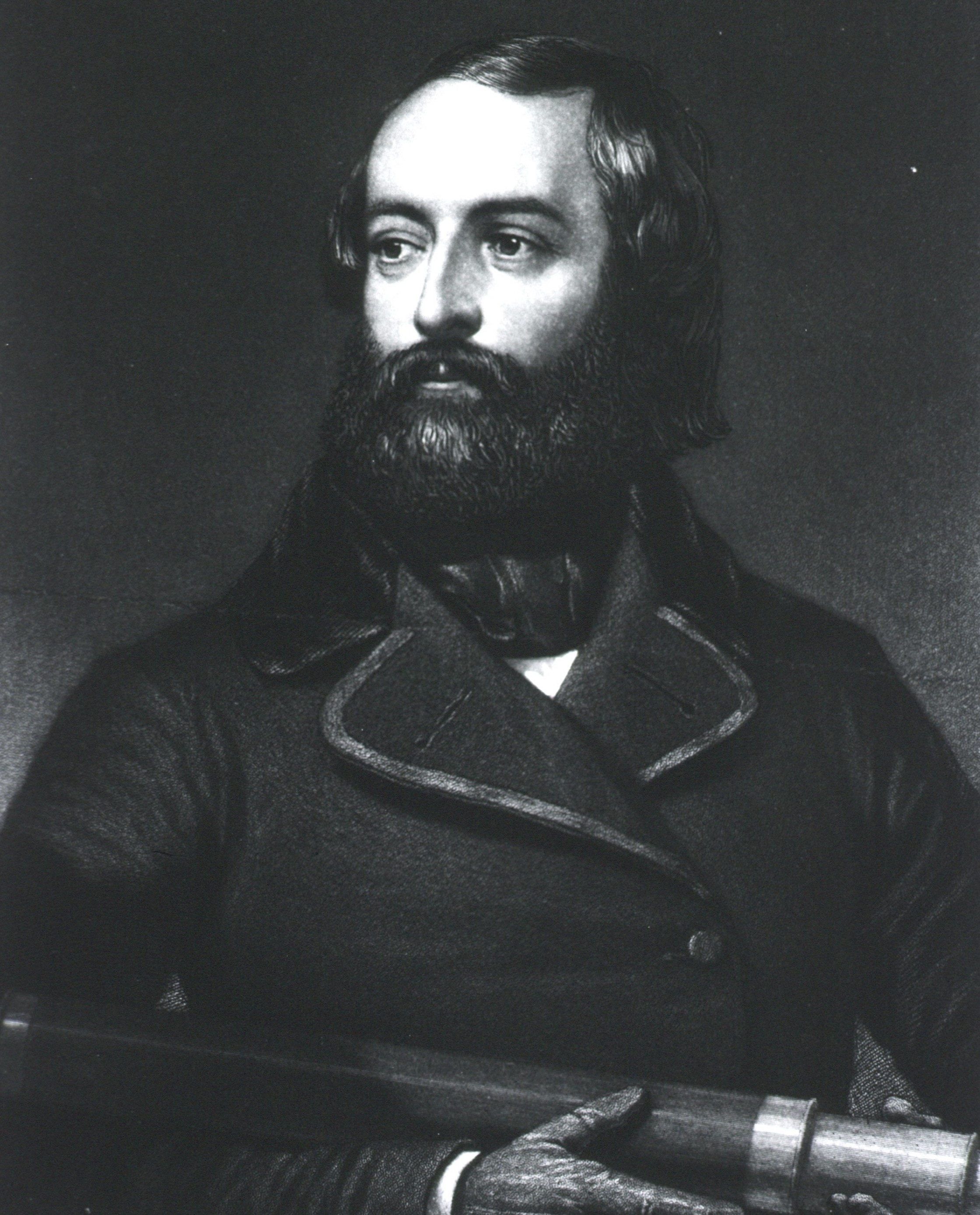
- Elisha Kent Kane's funeral was the largest in the United States until Abraham Lincoln's
  Elisha Kent Kane (1820–1857), physician, polar explorer, lover or husband of spiritualist Margaretta "Maggie" Fox
- John K. Kane (1795–1858), U.S. District Judge, Attorney General of Pennsylvania
- Ida Augusta Keller (1866-1932), botanist and plant physiologist; organized Science Department at Bryn Mawr College
- William D. Kelley (1814–1890), U.S. Congressman
- Florence Kelley (1859–1932), social and political reformer
- Samuel George King (1816–1899), 73rd mayor of Philadelphia
- Thomas Story Kirkbride (1809-1883), pioneering psychiatrist, first superintendent Institute of the Pennsylvania Hospital
- James Kitchenman (1825–1909), carpet manufacturer
- Lon Knight (1853–1932), professional baseball player

== L ==
- Elie A. F. La Vallette (1790–1862), U.S. Navy, one of first rear admirals appointed in 1862
- Henry Charles Lea (1825–1909), historian
- Isaac Lea (1792–1886), conchologist, geologist and publisher
- Langdon "Biffy" Lea (1874-1937), member College Football Hall of Fame
- Mathew Carey Lea (1823–1897), chemist and lawyer, father of mechanochemistry
- Napoleon LeBrun (1821–1901), architect Academy of Music (Philadelphia), many others
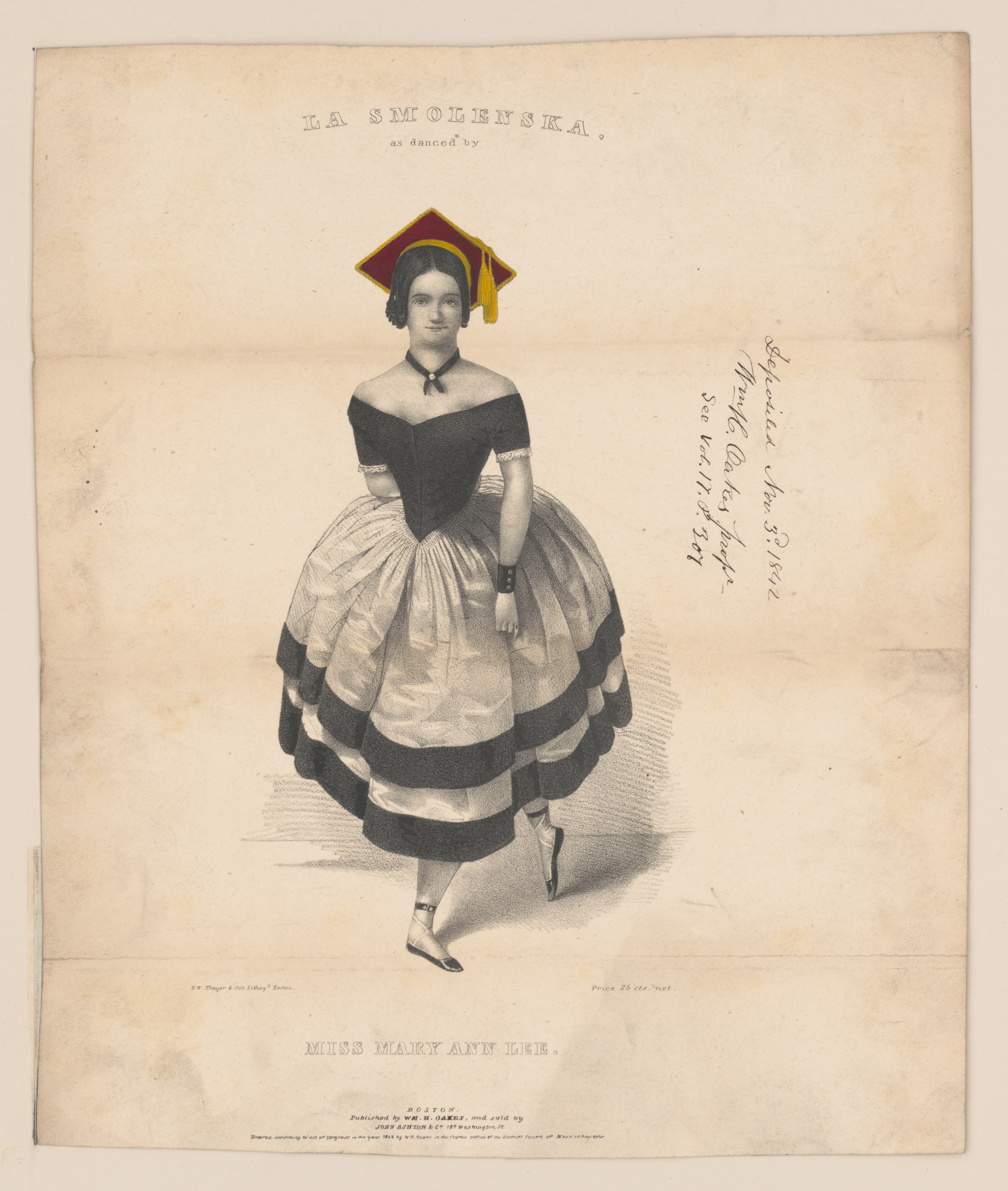
- Mary Ann Lee was one of America's first ballerinas
  Mary Ann Lee (1823–1899), professional ballerina
- Michael Leib (1760–1822), U.S. Congressman
- Thomas Leiper (1745–1825), American Revolutionary War veteran, first American to construct a permanent working railway
- Lewis Charles Levin (1808–1860), U.S. Congressman
- Joshua Ballinger Lippincott (1813-1886), publisher and founder of J.B. Lippincott & Co. publishing house
- Rachel Lloyd (1839–1900), first U.S. woman to receive Ph.D. in chemistry
- George Horace Lorimer (1868–1937), editor-in-chief of The Saturday Evening Post
- Harry Luff (1856–1916), Major League Baseball player
- Anna Lukens (1844–1917), physician

== M ==
- Charles Macalester (1798–1873), businessman, banker, philanthropist and namesake of Macalester College
- Edward Yorke Macauley (1827–1894), U.S. naval officer
- George McClellan, M.D. (1796-1847), founder, Jefferson Medical College
- Alexander Kelly McClure (1828–1909), Pennsylvania State Senator
- George Deardorff McCreary (1846–1915), U.S. Congressman
- Jack McFetridge (1869–1917), Major League Pitcher with Philadelphia Phillies
- Thomas McKean (1734–1817), lawyer and politician, signer of the Declaration of Independence
- Morton McMichael (1807–1879), editor The Saturday Evening Post, publisher The North American, veteran American Civil War, Mayor of Philadelphia (1866–1869)
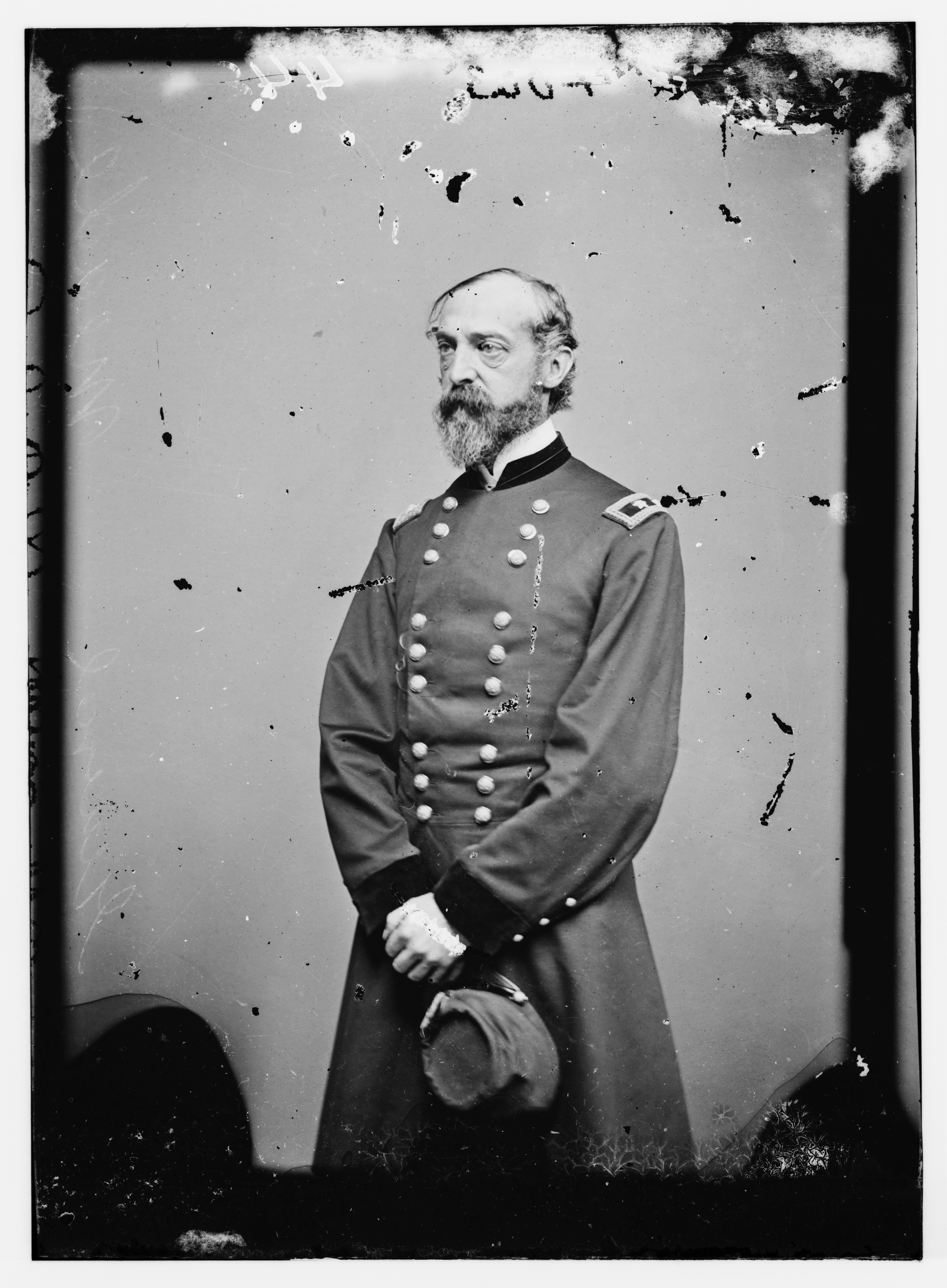
- Union Army major general George Meade was the victor at the Battle of Gettysburg
  George Gordon Meade (1815–1872), Civil War Union Army major general, victor at the Battle of Gettysburg
- James Mease (1771-1846) prominent scientist, horticulturist, and doctor who published the first known tomato-based ketchup recipe in 1812
- Charles Delucena Meigs M.D. (1792–1869), obstetrician who did not believe in anesthesia or the germ theory
- George Wallace Melville (1841–1912), U.S. Navy Admiral, engineer, Arctic explorer, author
- Hugh Mercer (1726–1777), Continental Army general in the American Revolution
- Samuel Mercer (1799–1862), U.S. naval officer
- Samuel Vaughan Merrick (1801–1870), first president of the Pennsylvania Railroad
- Helen Abbott Michael, M.D. (1857–1904), early phytochemist, physician
- E. Spencer Miller, (1817-1879), dean University of Pennsylvania Law School
- Charles Karsner Mills, M.D. (1845–1930), neurologist
- William Millward (1822–1871), U.S. Congressman
- E. Coppée Mitchell (1836–1887), Professor and Dean of the University of Pennsylvania Law School
- James T. Mitchell (1834–1915), Justice of the Supreme Court of Pennsylvania from 1889 to 1903, Chief Justice from 1903 to 1910
- John Moffet (1831–1884), U.S. Congressman-elect
- Edward Joy Morris (1815–1881), U.S. Congressman
- Roland S. Morris (1874–1945), U.S. Ambassador to Japan, President of American Philosophical Society
- James St. Clair Morton (1829–1864), Union Army general in Civil War
- Samuel George Morton (1799–1855), physician, natural scientist and writer
- Alexander Murray (1755–1821), American officer during Revolutionary War

== N ==
- Henry Morris Naglee (1815–1886), Union Army general during the U.S. Civil War, namesake for Naglee Park, San Jose, California
- Charles Naylor (1806–1872), U.S. Congressman
- Matthew Newkirk (1794–1868), businessman, president Philadelphia, Wilmington and Baltimore Railroad
- Albert Newsam (1809–1864), deaf lithographer and painter
- John Notman (1810–1865), Scottish-born American architect

== O ==
- Joshua T. Owen (1822–1887), Union brigadier general during the Civil War

== P ==
- Francis E. Patterson (1821–1862), Union general in the Civil War
- Robert Patterson (1743–1824), mathematician, Director United States Mint 1805–1824
- Robert Maskell Patterson (1787–1854), chemist, mathematician, physician, Director United States Mint 1835–1851
- Robert Patterson (1792–1881), Irish-born United States major general during the American Civil War
- Franklin Peale (1795–1870), 3rd chief coiner at United States Mint at Philadelphia
- Titian Peale (1799–1885), artist
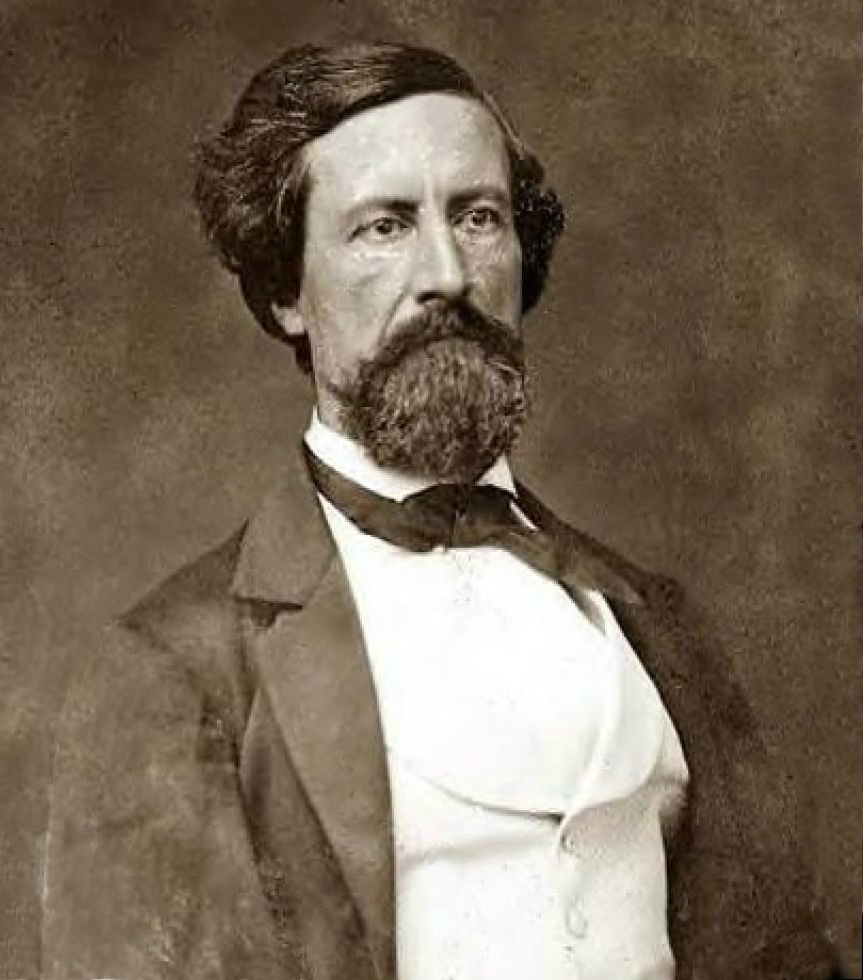
- The families of Union military leaders protested again the burial of Confederate General John C. Pemberton in Laurel Hill Cemetery
  John C. Pemberton (1814–1881), Confederate Civil War general
- Garrett J. Pendergrast (1802–1862), U.S. Civil War naval officer
- Mary Engle Pennington (1872–1952), U.S. scientist and refrigeration innovator
- Boies Penrose (1860–1921), U.S. Senator
- Charles B. Penrose (1798–1857), Pennsylvania State Senator and Solicitor of the U.S. Treasury
- Charles Bingham Penrose (1862–1925), physician, inventor of Penrose drain
- William Pepper (1843–1898), physician, Provost of University of Pennsylvania, founder Free Library of Philadelphia
- Charles Jacobs Peterson (1818–1887), author, publisher Peterson's Magazine
- Hannah Mary Bouvier Peterson (1811–1870), author of "Bouvier's Familiar Astronomy" and The Young Wife's Cookbook
- Henry Peterson (1818–1891), editor for The Saturday Evening Post, novelist, poet, playwright, and abolitionist
- Robert Evans Peterson (1812-1894), book publisher and writer
- Alonzo Potter (1800–1865), third Episcopal bishop of the Diocese of Pennsylvania

== R ==
- Samuel J. Randall (1828–1890), U.S. Congressman, 29th speaker of the United States House of Representatives from 1876 to 1881
- William H. Rau (1855-1920), photographer
- George C. Read (1788–1862), U.S. Naval officer
- Thomas Buchanan Read (1822–1872), poet, sculptor, portrait-painter
- Esther de Berdt Reed (1746-1780), First lady of Pennsylvania, Co-founder of Ladies Association during the American Revolution
- Joseph Reed (1741–1785), Continental Congressman
- John E. Reyburn (1845–1914), U.S. Congressman, mayor of Philadelphia
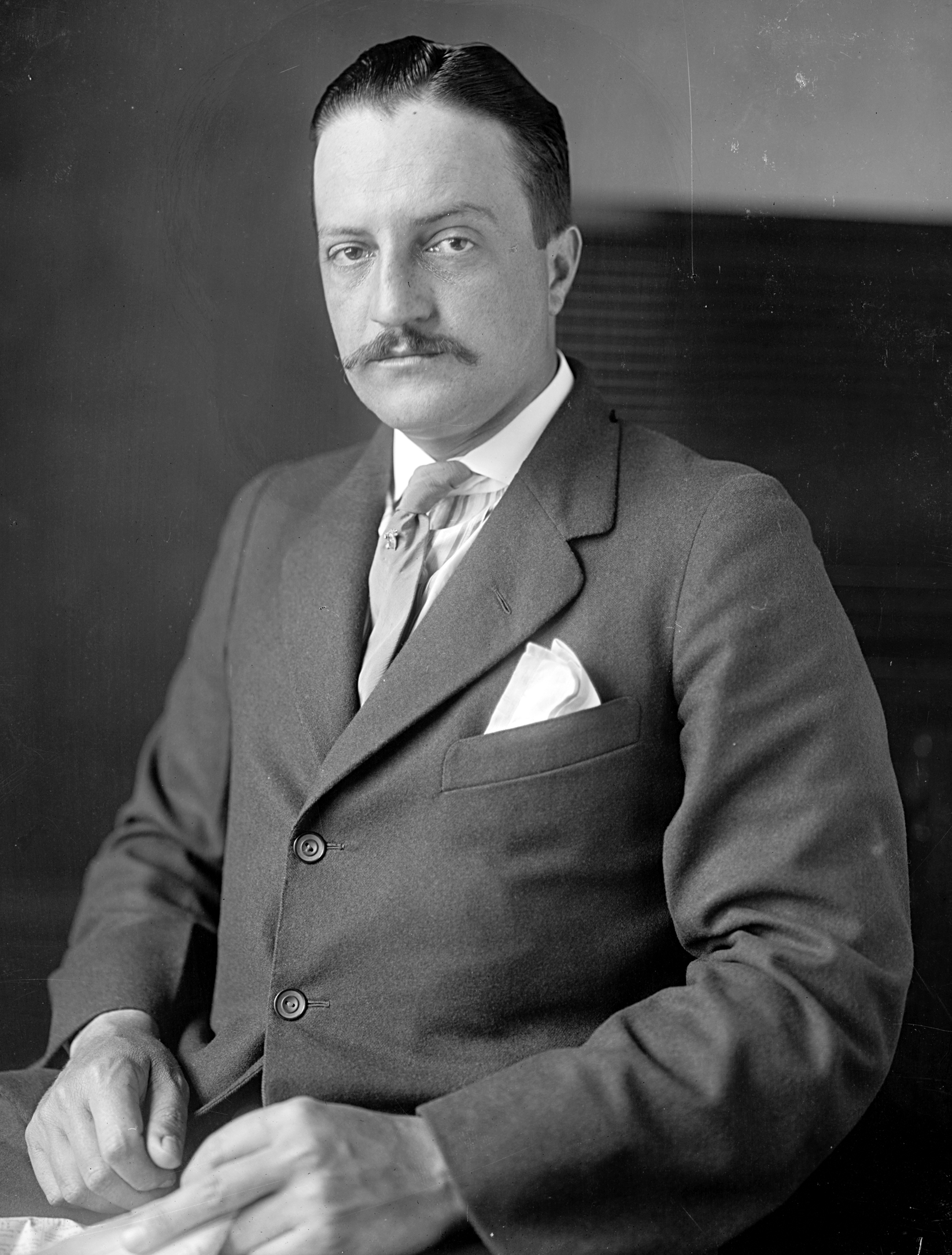
- William S. Reyburn served as a U.S. Congressman for Pennsylvania's 2nd district from 1911 to 1913
  William S. Reyburn (1882–1946), U.S. Congressman
- Benjamin Wood Richards (1797–1851), mayor of Philadelphia
- Samuel Richards (1769-1842), New Jersey ironmaster, half brother of Benjamin Wood Richards
- Jacob Ridgway (1768–1843), merchant and diplomat
- David Rittenhouse (1732–1796), astronomer, inventor, mathematician, surveyor
- Elizabeth Wentworth Roberts (1871-1927) painter, PAFA philanthropist, winner Mary Smith Prize
- John Robbins (1808–1880), U.S. Congressman
- Moncure Robinson (1802–1891), civil engineer and railroad planner
- Fairman Rogers (1833–1900), civil engineer, educator and equestrian
- William Ronckendorff (1812–1891), U.S. Naval officer
- Richard Rush (1780–1859), U.S. Attorney General
- Richard H. Rush (1825-1893), colonel who led 6th Pennsylvania Cavalry Regiment, aka "Rush's Lancers"

== S ==
- Charles Eucharist de Medicis Sajous (1852-1929), physician, specialist in laryngology and endocrinology, prolific author
- John Morin Scott (1789–1858), mayor of Philadelphia from 1841 to 1844
- John Sergeant (1779–1852), U.S. Congressman and 1832 Republican vice presidential nominee
- Jonathan Dickinson Sergeant (1746–1793), Continental Congressman
- Thomas Sergeant (1782-1860), lawyer, judge and politician
- Adam Seybert (1773–1825), U.S. Congressman
- George Sharswood (1810–1883), Pennsylvania jurist, Chief Justice of the Supreme Court of Pennsylvania
- William Short (1759–1849), private secretary and "adopted son" for Thomas Jefferson
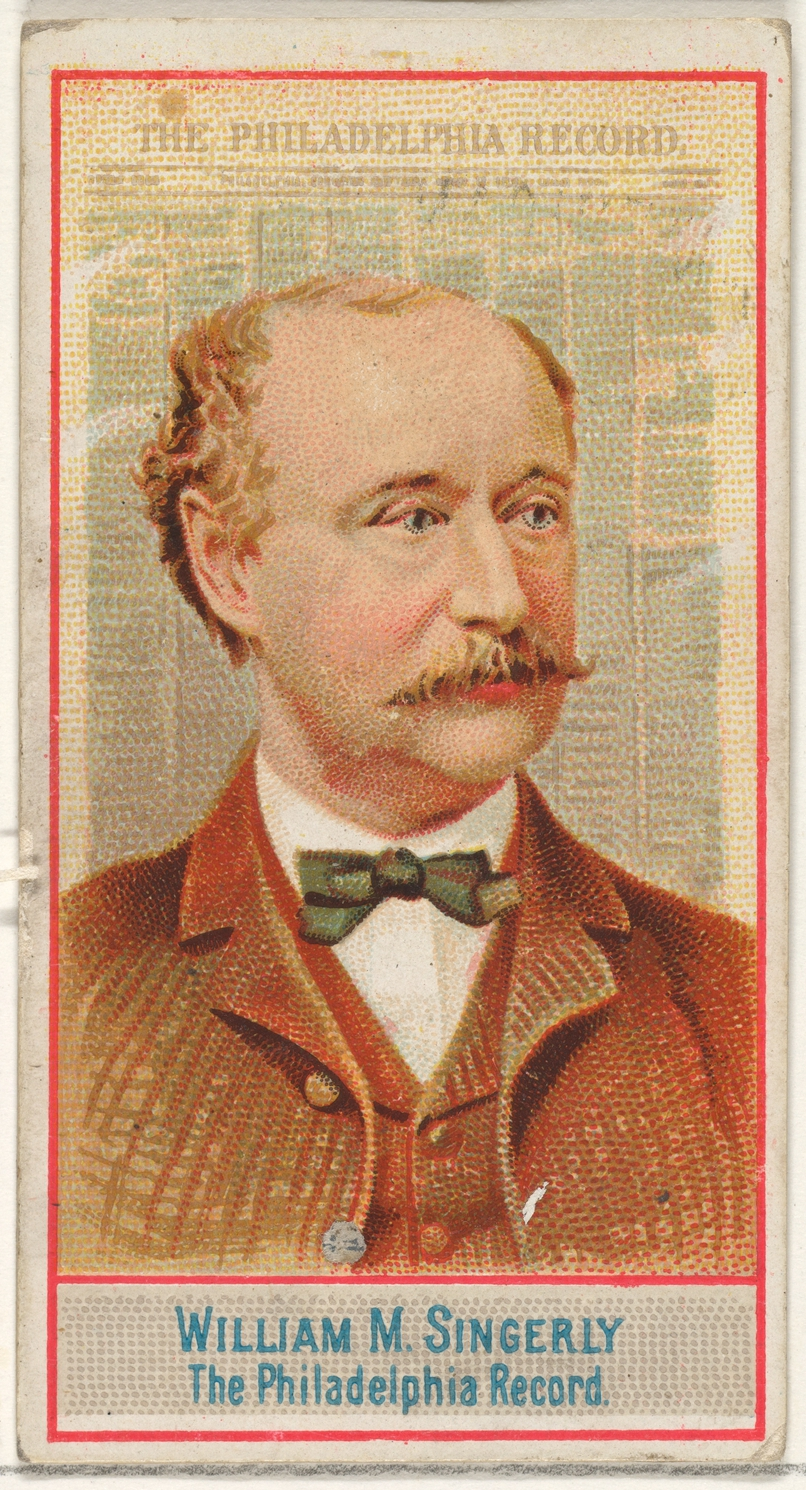
- William M. Singerly was the publisher of The Philadelphia Record
  William M. Singerly (1832–1898), businessman and newspaper publisher
- Arthur Donaldson Smith (1866–1939), physician, hunter, explorer of Africa
- Charles Ferguson Smith (1807–1862), Civil War Union Army general
- John K. Smith (1800-1845) pharmacist and businessman, founder of SmithKline as in GlaxoSmithKline
- John Rowson Smith (1810–1864), panorama painter
- John T. Smith (1801–1864), U.S. Congressman for Pennsylvania's 3rd congressional district from 1843 to 1845
- Persifor Frazer Smith (1798–1858), U.S. Army officer
- Richard Penn Smith (1799–1854), playwright, wrote fake biography of Davy Crockett
- William Smith (1727-1803), first Provost of the College of Philadelphia
- A. Loudon Snowden (1835–1912), politician, diplomat, superintendent of Philadelphia Mint
- James Ross Snowden (1809–1878), director United States Mint 1853–1861
- William Clinton South (1866–1938), color photography pioneer, violin maker and collector
- Sarah Logan Wister Starr (1873-1956) humanitarian, philanthropist, president of Woman’s Medical College of Pennsylvania, 1921-1941
- John Batterson Stetson (1830–1906), hat manufacturer, reinterred to West Laurel Hill Cemetery
- Christine Wetherill Stevenson (1878–1922), cofounder Plays and Players Theatre, Philadelphia Art Alliance, and Hollywood Bowl
- Sara Yorke Stevenson, PhD, (1847–1921), archaeologist specializing in Egyptology, cofounder University of Pennsylvania Museum of Archaeology and Anthropology, suffragist
- Alfred Stillé, M.D. (1813–1900), expelled from Yale for Conic Sections Rebellion, received medical degree from University of Pennsylvania, president American Medical Association
- William S. Stokely (1823–1902), 72nd mayor of Philadelphia
- Witmer Stone (1866–1939), ornithologist, botanist
- Alfred Sully (1820–1879), military officer
- Rosalie Sully (1818–1847), painter, daughter of Thomas, had affair with actress Charlotte Cushman
- Thomas Sully (1783–1872), portrait painter

== T ==
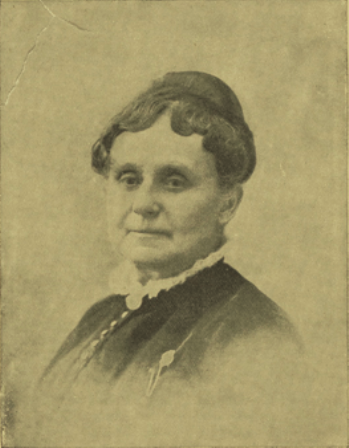
- M. Louise Thomas helped to organize the Women's Centenary Association in Philadelphia during the American Civil War
  M. Louise Thomas (1822–1907), social reformer
- Charles Thomson (1729–1824), secretary of the Continental Congress
- George Washington Toland (1796–1869), U.S. Congressman
- Laura Matilda Towne (1825–1901), abolitionist and educator
- George Alfred Townsend (1841–1914), Civil War correspondent who used pen name 'Gath', author
- Levi Twiggs (1793–1847), U.S. Marine Corps officer killed at the Battle of Chapultepec
- Hector Tyndale (1821–1880), Union army general
- Job Roberts Tyson (1803–1858), U.S. Congressman

== V ==
- Pinkerton R. Vaughn (1841–1866), Medal of Honor recipient
- Richard Vaux (1816–1895), U.S. Congressman, mayor of Philadelphia
- William Sansom Vaux (1811–1882), mineralogist

== W ==
- Thomas Ustick Walter (1804–1887), architect
- John Welsh (1805-1886), merchant and diplomat who served as US Minister to the Court of St. James's.
- Joseph Wharton (1826–1909), industrialist who founded the Wharton School at the University of Pennsylvania, co-founded the Bethlehem Steel company, and was one of the founders of Swarthmore College
- Eleanor Elkins Widener (1861–1937), wife of George Dunton Widener, survivor of RMS Titanic sinking, responsible for Harry Elkins Widener Library at Harvard University
- George D. Widener Jr. (1889–1971), thoroughbred racehorse owner
- Joseph E. Widener (1871–1943), thoroughbred owner/breeder
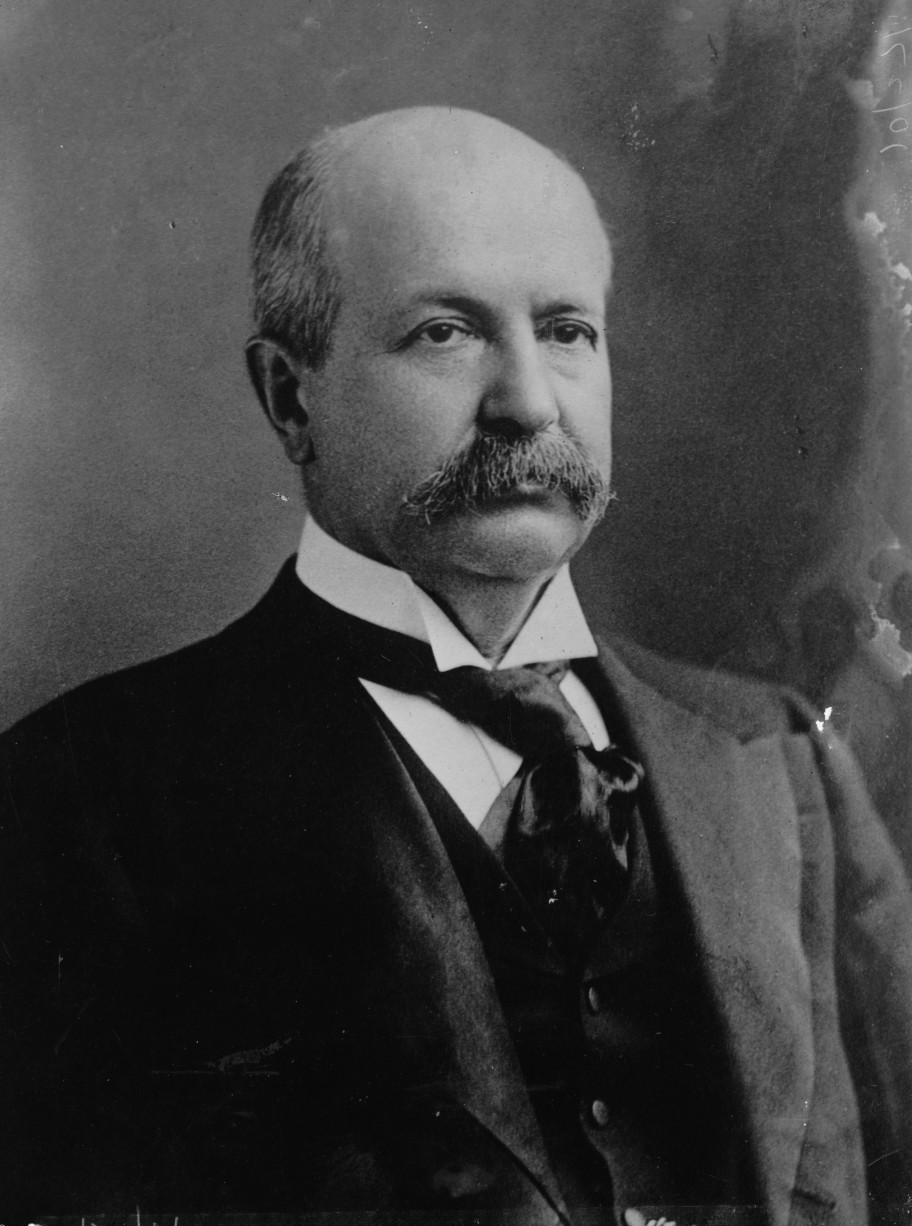
- Peter Arrell Browne Widener is considered one of the 100 wealthiest Americans
  Peter Arrell Browne Widener (1834–1915), business tycoon, philanthropist
- Jonathan Williams (1751–1815), U.S. Army officer and first superintendent of West Point
- John Rhea Barton Willing (1864–1913), music enthusiast and violin collector
- Joseph Lapsley Wilson (1844–1928), military officer, railroad executive, and horticulturalist
- Matthew Henry Wilson (1814-1892), British-American painter of portraits, miniatures, and landscapes
- Annis Lee Wister, (1830-1908); translator who specialized in translations from German to English
- John Caspar Wister (1887–1982), one of the United States' most highly honored horticulturists, first director of John J. Tyler Arboretum
- Langhorne Wister (1834–1891), Union Army officer
- Owen Wister (1860–1938), novelist, author of The Virginian
- George Bacon Wood (1797–1879), physician, professor, and writer
- William B. Wood (1774–1861), theater manager, actor
- Charles Stewart Wurts (1790–1859), co-founder of Delaware and Hudson Canal Company
- John Wyeth (1770-1858), printer, best known for printing "Wyeth's Repository of Sacred Music, Part Second" (Harrisburg, PA: 1813)

== Z ==
- Jacob Zeilin (1806–1880), 7th Commandant of the U.S. Marine Corps, Marine Corps's first general officer
- J. Fred Zimmerman Jr. (1871–1948), theatre manager and stage producer
- J. Fred Zimmerman Sr. (1843–1925), theatre magnate
