= Mary W. Janvrin =

- Born: September 16, 1830; Exeter
- Died: August 12, 1870; Newton
- Occupation: Writer
- Spouse: Oliver Ellsworth

Mary Wolcott Janvrin Ellsworth (September 16, 1830 – August 12, 1870) was an American writer.

Mary Wolcott Ellsworth was born in 1830 in Exeter, New Hampshire. She was the daughter of Joseph Adams Janvrin, first cousin thrice removed of US President John Adams, and Lydia Ann Colcord Janvrin. She was educated at Exeter Female Seminary. In 1868, she married Oliver Ellsworth, Boston bookseller and son of Governor William Wolcott Ellsworth.

Her literary career began at age 18 with the prize-winning story "Children's Vows; or The Carnelian Ring". She published in a number of publications, including Godey's Lady Book, Peterson's Magazine, Lily of the Valley, and Lippincott's Magazine. Her stories include "Mrs. Deming's Troubles," (Godey's Lady Book, 1866) where an upper class woman attempts to teach her Irish domestic servant Kate how to make a pudding, and "The Legend of Starved Rock," (Peterson's Magazine, 1856) a story about Native American lovers that is a variation of a legend about a refuge on the Illinois River where the Illiniwek were supposedly exterminated by the Potowatomi.

Mary Wolcott Ellsworth died on 12 August 1870 in Newton, Massachusetts.

== Bibliography ==
- Peace; or, The Stolen Will. Boston: James French and Co., 1857.
- The Best Story, or, An Hour with the Children. 1860.
- The Foster Sisters of Venice. A Romance of Italy. Gleason, 1867.
- The White Lily and the Red Rose. Gleason, 1867.
- The Signet Ring; or, The Twin Princess of Grandda. Gleason, 1867.
- Micmac; or, The Settlement on the Oswego. Gleason, 1868.
- The Mysterious Hunter; or, The Mountain Cabin. Gleason, 1868
- (as Mrs. L. L. Worth) Smith's Saloon, or, The Grays and the Grants. New York: Warren and Wyman, 1871.
