= Clara Gottschalk Peterson =

American pianist, composer and editor (1837–1910)

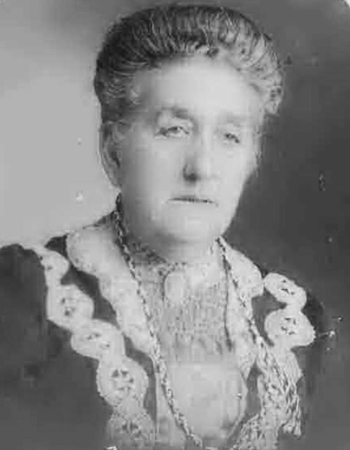
- Born: Clara Gottschalk; 1837; New Orleans, Louisiana, US
- Died: 1910 (aged 72–73); Asbury Park, New Jersey, US
- Occupations: Pianist, composer, editor
- Notable work: Creole Songs from New Orleans in the Negro Dialect
- Spouse: Robert Evans Peterson
- Relatives: Louis Moreau Gottschalk (brother)

Clara Gottschalk Peterson (1837–1910) was an American pianist, composer, and editor. She was the sister of virtuoso pianist Louis Moreau Gottschalk, editing a collection of his writings and working to preserve his memory after his death. She is remembered as "a staunch protector of her brother's music in its original form", as well as "a composer of considerable ability" in her own right.

== Early life ==
Clara Gottschalk was born in 1837 in New Orleans, Louisiana, one of the seven children of London-born Edward Gottschalk and Aimée (née Bruslé). The Gottschalk and Bruslé families were slave owners, and the children were raised in part by a nurse named Sally, who the Bruslés had taken with them as chattel from Saint-Domingue, and from whom they heard Creole legends and lullabies. Their maternal grandmother was also from Saint-Domingue, and between the two women its music "was a constant and vital presence in the Gottschalks' family circle".

In 1847, Aimée left her husband and moved with six of the children to Paris, France, where Louis Moreau was already studying music. Aimée was "reputed to have believed that all the Gottschalk children would be musically gifted", and although not all of them went on to be as acclaimed as Louis Moreau, "all did perform publicly and/ or compose at one time or another". The youngest brother, Louis Gaston Gottschalk, was an eminent opera singer and vocal teacher. Clara and Blanche were both professional pianists, and Celestine and Augusta also performed.

== Marriage and Notes of a Pianist ==
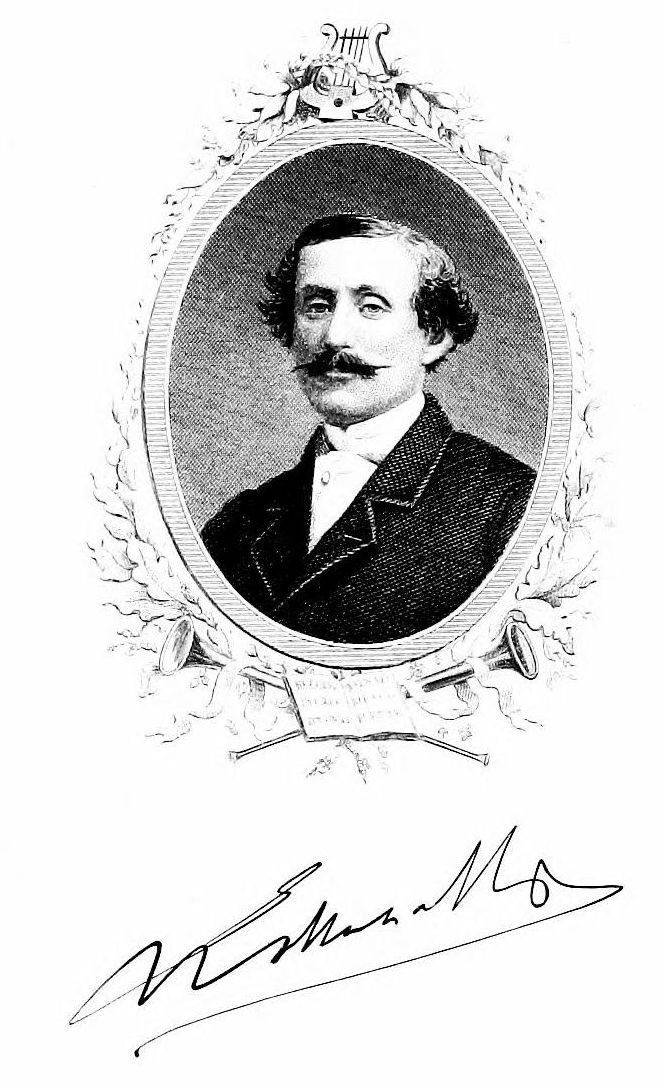
Louis Moreau Gottschalk, frontispiece from Notes of a Pianist, ed. Clara Gottschalk Peterson

In 1880, Clara Gottschalk married Dr. Robert E. Peterson in Philadelphia. In 1881, she published a collection of Louis Moreau's travel notes and diaries, entitled Notes of a Pianist, with "a long biographical preface gathering many testimonials and reviews from newspapers (all elogious)". It has been speculated that Clara may have bowdlerised her brother's writings in efforts to preserve his reputation. However, it is generally accepted that her reliance on published versions of the gathered texts means that omissions were Louis Moreau's, rather than hers. In his biography of Louis Moreau Gottschalk, S. Frederick Starr argued that:

The one major flaw in her edition of the Notes is that the English translation by her husband, Robert E. Peterson, is an appallingly anaemic rendering of Gottschalk's pungent French prose.

He adds that Clara's work "enabled the public to peer behind the mask of aloofness that Gottschalk invariably wore before the public", revealing him to be "an ironic commentator on everything from politics to religion". Clara assumed responsibility for memorialising her brother, and "for the rest of her life campaigned to confirm her brother's standing as the bard of Creole New Orleans":

It was she who encouraged a drab New Orleans insurance man, William H. Hawes, to collect every scrap of Gottschalk memorabilia and present them to the City of New Orleans. The bewildered mayor had to endure endless visits from Hawes, who doggedly checked to make sure that Gottschalk's bust was displayed prominently in City Hall.

== As pianist ==
Clara gave recitals on piano and introduced her brother's compositions to her audiences.

== Creole Songs ==
In 1902, Clara published Creole Songs from New Orleans in the Negro Dialect. Transcribed from memory, she stated in the collection's introduction that:

Dr. Dvořák has claimed that there is in time to be a native school of American music based upon the primitive musical utterances of the Indian and the negro among us. Then truly these melodies of the Louisiana negroes, which, quaintly merry or full of a very tender pathos, have served to rock whole generations of Southern children, are historical documents of some interest to the student and lover of music.

The influence of the songs gathered by Clara on Louis Moreau Gottschalk's compositions was also noted, with some being based on them directly.

== Death ==
Clara Gottschalk Peterson died at her home in Asbury Park, New Jersey on 25 July 1910. The New York Times noted that her house had been:

for many years the gathering place of Asbury Park's musicians, and even during the past Winter, despite her failing health, she gave musicales at which she played her brother's compositions.

She was survived by two step-children and her sister, Celestine Gottschalk, with whom she had lived for a number of years.

== Selected compositions ==
=== As composer ===
- The pixies' merry-making: petite caprice de genre, op. 11 (for piano) (c. 1867)
- A dream (song with piano) (1872)
- Fleur des champs: bluette musicale, op. 14 (for piano) (1872)
- Creole Songs from New Orleans in the Negro Dialect (1902)
  1. Quan' mo té dan' gran' chimain
  2. Mouché Mazireau
  3. Po' pitie Mamzé Zizi
  4. Zélim to quitté la plaine
  5. En avan' grènadié
  6. Ou Som Souroucou
  7. Salangadou
  8. Quan' patate la cuite
  9. Une deusse troisse
  10. Gardé piti milat' la
  11. Neg' pa' capab' marché
  12. Papa va a la rivière
- Staccato polka (for piano) (1909)
- In sylvan glade (for piano) (unknown date)

=== As editor ===
- Marguerite, Op. 76 (by Louis Moreau Gottschalk) (Waltz for piano) (published 1873)

== Bibliography ==
- Gottschalk, Louis Moreau (1881). Gottschalk Peterson, Clara (ed.). Notes of a pianist: During his professional tours in the United States, Canada, the Antilles, and South America, preceded by a short biographical sketch with contemporaneous criticisms. Translated by Peterson, Robert E. Philadelphia: J. B. Lippincott & Co.

== See also ==
- Louis Moreau Gottschalk
- Creole music
