= Henry Peterson (author) =

American editor, novelist, poet and playwright (1818-1891)

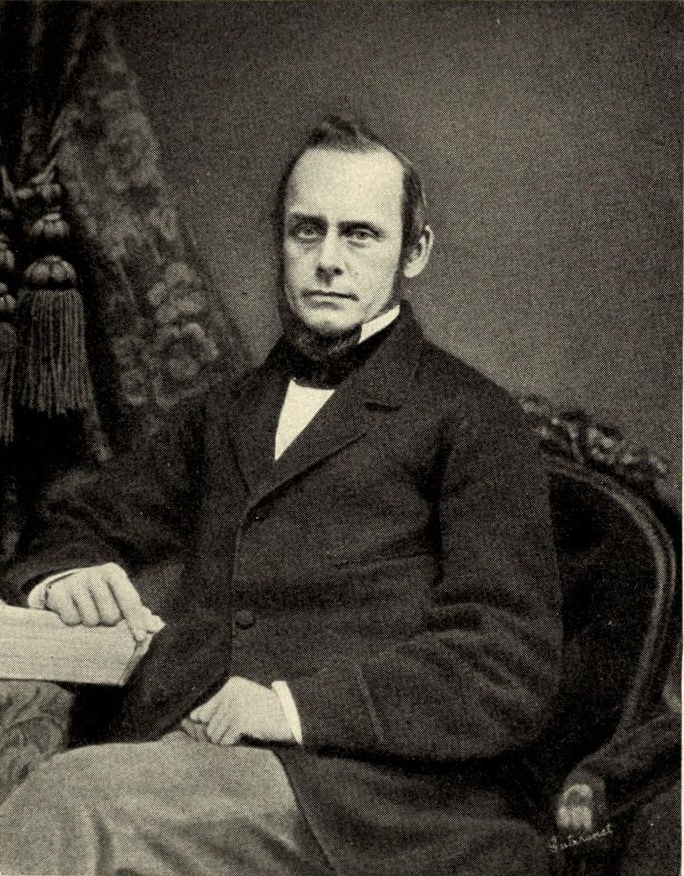
- Born: December 7, 1818; Philadelphia, Pennsylvania, U.S.
- Died: October 10, 1891 (aged 72); Philadelphia, Pennsylvania, U.S.
- Resting place: Laurel Hill Cemetery, Philadelphia, Pennsylvania, U.S.
- Occupations: editor, novelist, playwright, poet
- Employer: The Saturday Evening Post
- Spouse: Sarah Webb
- Parent(s): George Peterson, Jane (Evans) Peterson
- Writing career
- Language: American English
- Period: Modern

Henry Peterson (December 7, 1818 – October 10, 1891) was an American editor, novelist, poet, and playwright. He was editor of The Saturday Evening Post for thirty years and owner of H. Peterson & Company publishing firm. He was a member of the Peterson family of publishers including his brother Robert Evans Peterson and his cousin Charles Jacobs Peterson.

== Early life and education ==
He was born on December 7, 1818, in Philadelphia, Pennsylvania, to George and Jane (Evans) Peterson.

== Career ==
He worked as a clerk in a hardware store at age fourteen, and in 1839 joined the firm of Deacon & Peterson, who became publishers of the Saturday Evening Post. In 1843, Peterson became editor of the Saturday Evening Post. In 1848, he was half owner of the publication along with his brother-in-law Edmund Deacon, and the sole editor.

As editor, he refused to publish the works of the female writer, E.D.E.N. Southworth, on grounds that her work was "immoral". He refused to publish The Deserted Wife since it depicted a character who forced a young woman into marriage against her wishes.

The publication became very successful and Peterson bought out his brother-in-law and renamed the firm H. Peterson & Company. Peterson controlled the paper for almost thirty years and sold it to R.J.C. Walker.

H. Peterson & Company also published The Lady's Friend, edited by Peterson's wife, and Peterson's Magazine.

He addressed the Pennsylvania Anti-Slavery Society, and was quoted as saying "Even an army of occupation here could not put the Negro into the street cars."

He died on October 10, 1891, in Philadelphia and was interred at Laurel Hill Cemetery.

== Personal life ==
He was married to Sarah Webb, who edited The Lady's Friend magazine for ten years. Their son, Arthur Peterson, became assistant editor of the Post. His eldest brother was the publisher Robert Evans Peterson, and his cousin was the publisher Charles J. Peterson.

== Publications ==
- Address on American Slavery, Delivered Before the Semi-Annual Meeting of the Junior Anti-Slavery Society, of Philadelphia., Philadelphia: Published by Direction of the Society, 1838
- The Twin Brothers (1843)
- Poems, Philadelphia: J.B. Lippincott & Co., 1863
- Universal Suffrage (1867)
- The Modern Job, Philadelphia: H. Peterson & Co., 1869
- Pemberton, or One Hundred Years Ago, Henry T. Coates & Company, 1873
- Faire-Mount, Philadelphia: Claxton, Remsen & Haffelfinger, 1874
- Confessions of a Minister (1874)
- The drama Helen, or One hundred Years Ago, produced in 1876.
- Bessie's Six Lovers. A Summer Idyl., Philadelphia: T.B. Peterson & Brothers, 1877
- Caesar; a Dramatic Study. In Five Acts., Philadelphia: H. Peterson & Co., 1879
