= Robert Evans Peterson =

American book publisher and writer (1812-1894)

- Born: November 12, 1812; Philadelphia, Pennsylvania, U.S.
- Died: October 30, 1894 (aged 81); Asbury Park, New Jersey, U.S.
- Resting place: Laurel Hill Cemetery, Philadelphia, Pennsylvania, U.S.
- Occupations: publisher, writer
- Employer(s): Childs & Peterson
- Spouse(s): Hannah Mary Bouvier Peterson, Blanche Gottschalk, Clara Gottschalk Peterson
- Parent(s): George Peterson, Jane (Evans) Peterson
- Relatives: Henry Peterson (brother), Charles Jacobs Peterson (cousin)
- Writing career
- Language: American English
- Period: Modern

Robert Evans Peterson (November 12, 1812 – October 30, 1894) was an American book publisher and author. Along with George William Childs, he founded the publishing house of Childs & Peterson. He was a member of the Peterson family of publishers including his brother Henry Peterson and his cousin Charles Jacobs Peterson.

== Early life and education ==
Peterson was born on November 12, 1812, in Philadelphia, Pennsylvania, to George and Jane (Evans) Peterson. He studied law under his father-in-law, John Bouvier. He was admitted to the bar but never practiced law. He graduated from the University of Pennsylvania, with a medical degree in 1863, but never practiced medicine.

== Career ==
He worked in the hardware business until 1834. He assisted his father-in-law in editing his law works. In order to absolve the debt of his clients, Daniels & Smith, booksellers, purchased their business, and operated it as R. E. Peterson & Co.

On the death of John Bouvier in 1851, he partnered with George W. Childs and established the publishing house of Childs & Peterson, which became involved in 1857–58. Peterson then retired from the publishing and bookselling business and took up the study of medicine.

He died on October 30, 1894, at his summer residence in Asbury Park, New Jersey and was interred at Laurel Hill Cemetery in Philadelphia.

== Personal life ==
He married Hannah Mary Bouvier, the daughter of Judge John Bouvier. After his wife died in 1870, he was re-married, in 1872, to Blanche Gottschalk, sister of Louis M. Gottschalk, and after her death in 1879, a third time, to her sister Clara.

His family included several publishers and editors: his brother Henry Peterson edited the Saturday Evening Post for twenty years, and his cousin Charles J. Peterson was an owner of the Post and founder of Peterson's Magazine.

He presented Judge Bouvier's law library to the University of Pennsylvania.

== Publications ==
He published Bouvier's Law Dictionary and Bouvier's Institutes of American Law; Dr. Kane's Arctic Explorations; Brazil and Brazilians, and numerous text books, and was the author of: The Roman Catholic Church not the Only True Religion (1891).

- Peterson's Familiar Science; or the Scientific Explanation of Common Things., Philadelphia: George W. Childs, 1866
