= Baleroy Mansion =

Estate in Philadelphia, Pennsylvania, U.S.

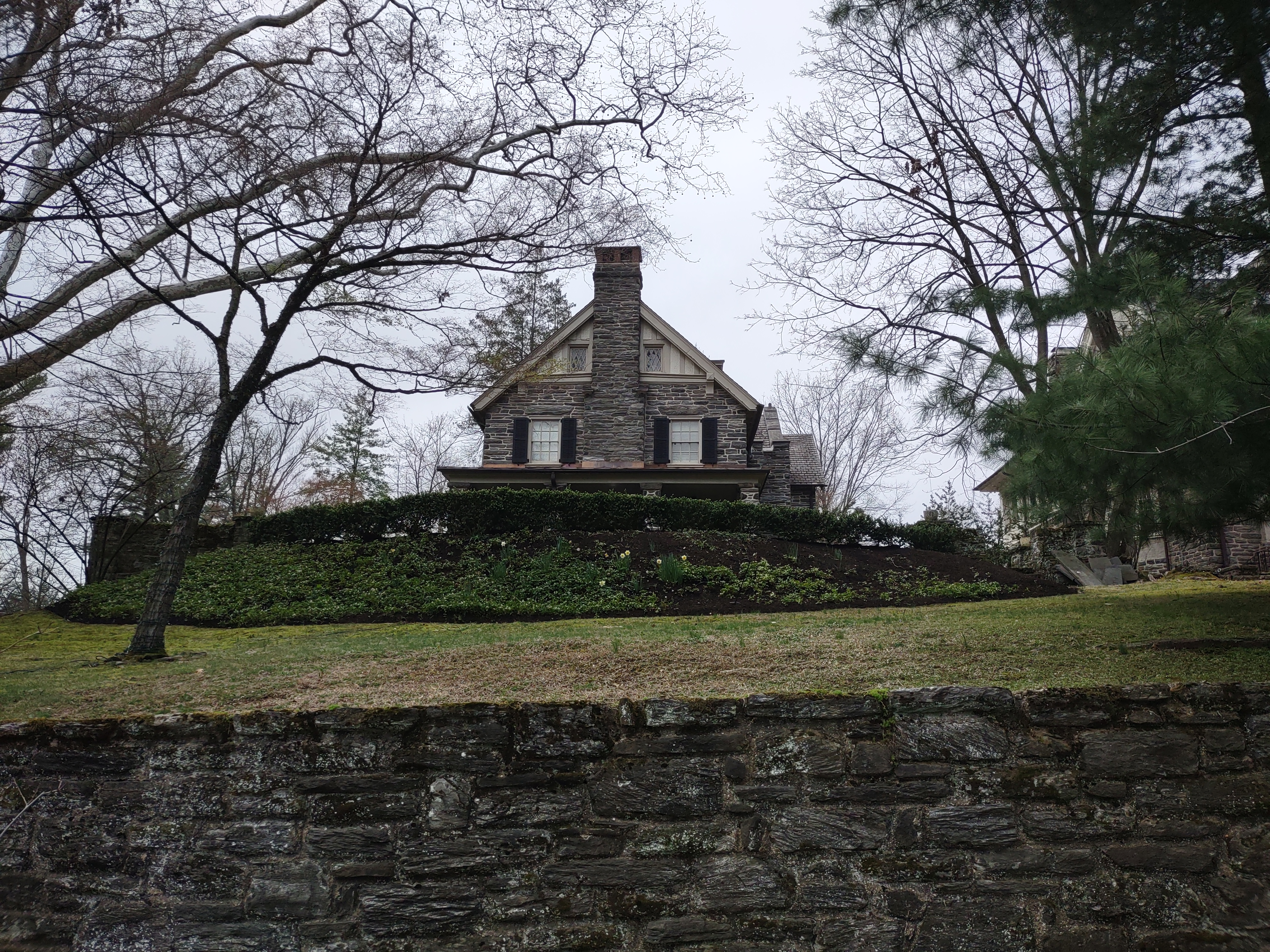

- Location within Pennsylvania

General information
- Location: West Mermaid Lane, Chestnut Hill, Philadelphia, Pennsylvania, US
- Coordinates: 40.0659°N 75.1995°W
- Completed: 1911 (added to in 1925)

Technical details
- Size: 22,088 ft. (land); 5,904 ft. (living)

Other information
- Number of rooms: 33

The Baleroy Mansion is a 32-room estate located in the historic and affluent Chestnut Hill section of Philadelphia, Pennsylvania, in the United States. It has obtained the title of "Most Haunted Home in America" The name "Baleroy" was chosen by its owner George Meade Easby, great-grandson of General George Meade (hero of the Battle of Gettysburg during the American Civil War). The estate's name was likely derived from Balleroy in France.

== History ==
The mansion or its separate carriage house was originally built in 1911. The first owner was a carpenter who is said to have murdered his wife inside the main house. It was purchased in 1926 by the Easbys, "a family that traces its roots to Easby Abbey in 12th-century Yorkshire, England; that crossed over to America in 1683 aboard the Welcome with William Penn, and that counts among its descendants three - 'at least three that I know of,' says Easby - signers of the Declaration of Independence." Baleroy housed many antique pieces that were handed down by famous historical people, including Napoleon of France, U.S. General George Meade, Thomas Jefferson, and others.

After the Easbys moved into this large and spacious estate in 1926, George Meade Easby and his younger brother May Stevenson Easby, Jr., were playing one day in the courtyard of the mansion and laughing at their reflections in the main courtyard fountain, when Steven's reflection turned into a skull. George's reflection was normal. Steven died in 1931 from an undetermined childhood disease. This greatly devastated George and his parents, but they continued living in the mansion for the rest of their lives. They along with their housekeepers and visitors have experienced many hauntings throughout the years.

George's mother died in 1962 at the age of about 82 and his father died in 1969, reaching about 90. Following their deaths Easby began to hire housekeepers to do general work in and around the mansion. However, none of the workers lived with him. In July 1992, Baleroy Mansion was burglarized by a very skillful thief. An estimated $202,000 worth of antiques were carefully stolen without ransacking or leaving a sign of forced entry. The police who were investigating the incident stated, "The thief seemed to know what he was looking for and where it was kept." In an article dated April 3, 1999, in the Inquirer Magazine, "Easby tells a chilling tale of waking up and feeling someone clutching his arm. When he turned on the light, no one was there."

In July 2012, indie rock band The Walkmen shot a music video for their song "The Love You Love" at Baleroy. The band was looking for a unique location to support the surreal nature of the video and witnessed some unexplainable events while there.

== Death of George Meade Easby ==
George Meade Easby died on 11 December 2005, at the age of 87. On July 9, 2012, Baleroy Mansion was sold after all antiques were sold at auction or donated to local museums. Most of Easby's antique cars have been sold in recent years. They include the 1954 Rolls-Royce Silver Wraith which was previously owned by Prince Aly Khan, husband of the American actress Rita Hayworth and father of Aga Khan IV, and Easby's first automobile, the 1935 Packard Super Eight which was sold for $110,000. A number of other antique items belonging to Easby have also been sold through auctions.

== Hauntings ==
Another claimed ghost is an unknown elderly woman that reportedly walks the upstairs hallway with a cane. Family members and guests were toyed with by the spirits, and it was never uncommon to hear knocking and unexplained footsteps. A respected minister was hit by a flying antique pot that flew like a missile. Electrical fields in the house also attract lightning, and the electricity would go off for no reason. People, including family members, housekeepers, visitors, and even renovators, claim to have seen these ghosts. Others have allegedly seen or heard 1930s phantom cars that drove up the long and narrow driveway into the estate's parking area, but when they went to look there was nothing to see.

=== Blue room and the chair of death ===
In the infamous blue room of the mansion, a 200-year-old blue chair known as the "chair of death" is said to be cursed. It has been said that when someone sits in it, the person dies. About four people are said to have died, and Easby then banned people from sitting in the chair. The chair was said to be owned by Napoleon. It has been said that the chair is haunted by the ghost of Amanda, a red mist that is said to kill people who sit in the chair. The chair is said to have been made by an evil warlock in the 18th/19th century.

== Tours ==
Although Baleroy was once open to tours showcasing its large collection of antiques, the antiques have been removed and the property is now a private home. Public tours are currently unavailable.

== See also ==
- Reportedly haunted locations in Pennsylvania
