= Charles Jacobs Peterson =

American editor, publisher and writer (1818–1887)

- Born: July 20, 1818; Philadelphia, Pennsylvania, U.S.
- Died: March 4, 1887 (aged 68); Philadelphia, Pennsylvania, U.S.
- Resting place: Laurel Hill Cemetery, Philadelphia, Pennsylvania, U.S.
- Education: University of Pennsylvania
- Occupations: editor, publisher, writer
- Employer(s): Graham's Magazine, The Saturday Evening Post, Peterson's Magazine, Philadelphia Bulletin
- Spouse: Sarah Powell
- Parent(s): Thomas P. Peterson, Elizabeth Snelling Jacobs
- Writing career
- Pen name: Harry Cavendish, Harry Danforth, J. Thornton Randolph
- Language: American English
- Period: Modern
- Genres: Anti-Tom literature, history

Charles Jacobs Peterson (July 20, 1818 – March 4, 1887) was an American editor, publisher and writer. He worked as an editor at Graham's Magazine, was an owner and partner of The Saturday Evening Post, and founded Peterson's Magazine. He published several fictional and non-fictional history books under his own name and the Anti-Tom literature novel The Cabin and Parlor; or, Slaves and Masters under the pseudonym J. Thornton Randolph. He was a member of the Peterson family of publishers including his cousins Robert Evans Peterson and Henry Peterson.

== Early life and education ==
Peterson was born in Philadelphia, Pennsylvania, on July 20, 1819, to Thomas P. Peterson and Elizabeth Snelling Jacobs. He studied law at the University of Pennsylvania and graduated in 1838. He was admitted to the bar prior to graduation, but never practiced law.

== Career ==
He became an owner and partner in The Saturday Evening Post and editor at Graham's Magazine. At Graham's, he shared an editorial desk with Edgar Allan Poe, who later included him on a list of "journalistic ninnies". In 1842, he founded Ladies' National Magazine to compete with the popular Godey's Lady Book. In 1848, the name was changed to Peterson's Ladies' National Magazine and again to just Peterson's Magazine from 1858 to 1898. Ann S. Stephens was listed as an editor and contributor, but the magazine was primarily run by Peterson. By the 1870s, it had a circulation of 150,000. Peterson edited the magazine until his death.

Peterson was employed as an editorial writer for the Philadelphia Bulletin starting in 1847. In 1852, he published the novel The Cabin and Parlor; or, Slaves and Masters under the pseudonym J. Thornton Randolph, an early example of the Anti-Tom literature which arose in response to Uncle Tom's Cabin. It was published by T.B. Peterson, Ltd.; Theophilus B. Peterson was one of Charles' brothers and a leading publisher of cheap and sensational fiction. He framed the argument that slave owners took a parental responsibility to the slave, whereas commercial interests in the North took advantage of the free negro. It was adapted to the stage and performed at the Richmond Theater in Richmond, Virginia in 1854 and 1861. Peterson was not necessarily defending the institution of slavery, but rather promoting a gradual abolition instead of an abrupt cessation, which he felt would fracture the United States. After the American Civil War broke out, he sided with the Union. However, he kept politics and any mention of the war out of Peterson's Magazine since he believed women wanted an escape from the gruesome news of the war.

He published other stories and articles under the pseudonym Harry Cavendish and Harry Danforth.

He died on March 4, 1887, in Philadelphia and was interred at Laurel Hill Cemetery.

== Personal life ==
He married Sarah Powell.

== Publications ==
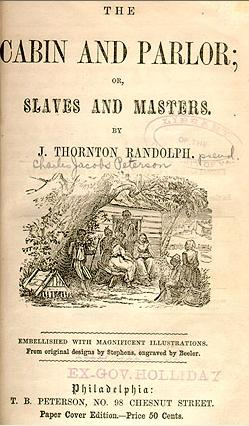
Peterson published the Anti-Tom literature novel The Cabin and Parlor under the pseudonym J. Thornton Randolph

Some were originally published in serial form in Graham's Magazine or Peterson's:

- Agnes Courtenay (1847)
- The Oath of Marion (1847)
- Grace Dudley; or Arnold at Saratoga. An Historical Novel., Philadelphia: T.B. Peterson, 1849
- The Valley Farm. An Autobiography of an Orphan., Philadelphia: T.B. Peterson, 1850
- Cruising in the Last War, Philadelphia: T.B. Peterson, 1850
- The Cabin and Parlor; or, Slaves and Masters (as J. Thornton Randolph) (1852)
- Kate Aylesford. A Story of the Refugees., Philadelphia: T.B. Peterson, 1855
- The Old Stone Mansion, Philadelphia: T.B. Peterson and Brothers, 1859
- Mabel or Darkness at Dawn (18??)

=== Nonfiction ===
- Military Heroes of the Revolution (8 volumes) (1847)
- The Military Heroes of the War of 1812: With a Narrative of the War, Philadelphia: James B. Smith & Co., 1852
- Naval Heroes of the United States (1850)
- A History of the American Revolution, and Historical Sketches of the Military Heroes of the War of Independence., Philadelphia: J. and J. L. Gihon, 1852
- The American Navy: Being an Authentic History of the United States Navy, and Biographical Sketches of American Naval Heroes, from the Formation of the Navy to the Close of the Mexican War, Philadelphia: Jas. B. Smith & Co., 1856
