= George William Childs =

American publisher (1829–1894)

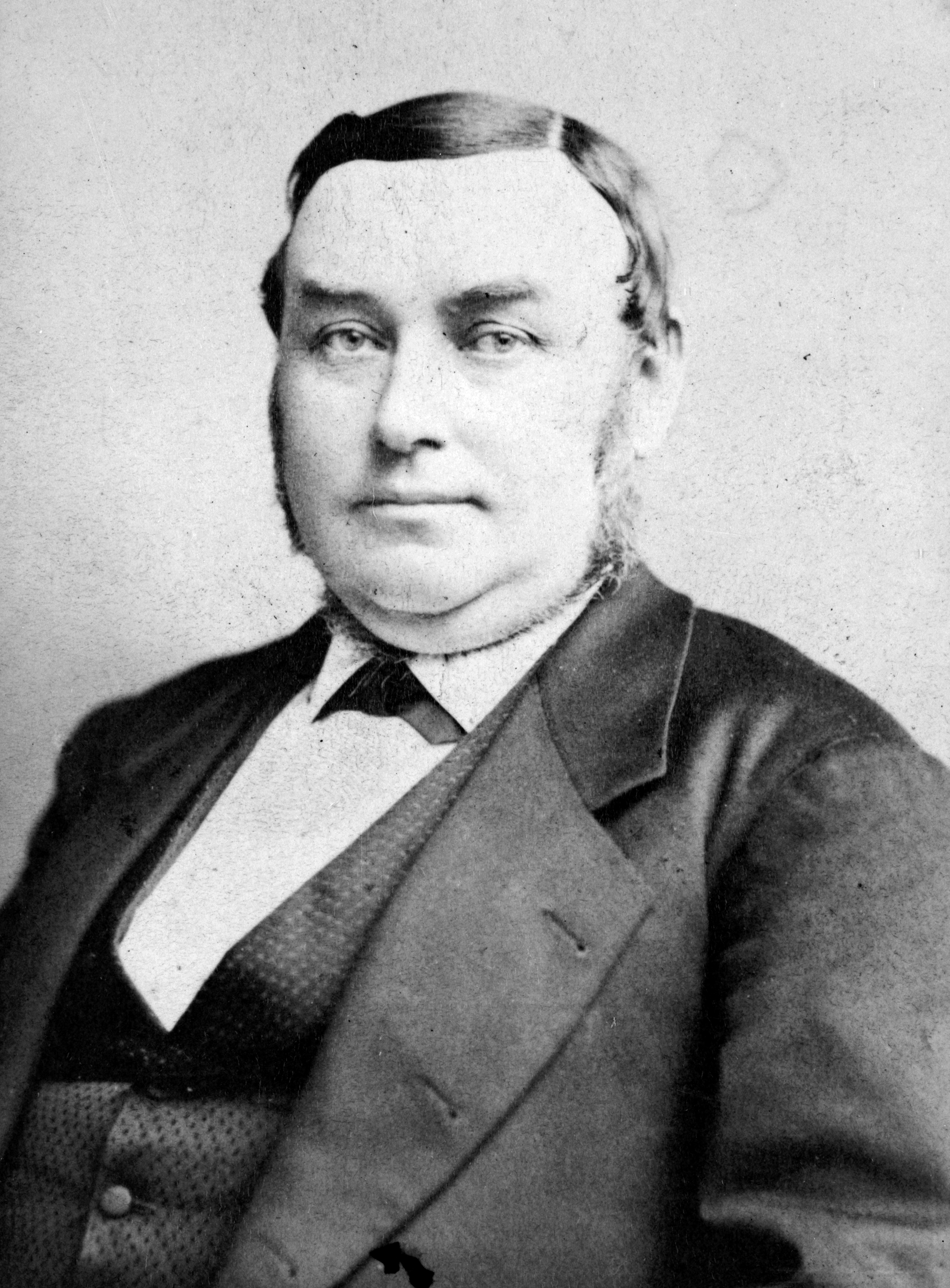
- Portrait of Childs in the 1870s by Frederick Gutekunst
- Born: May 12, 1829; Baltimore, Maryland, U.S.
- Died: February 3, 1894 (aged 64); Philadelphia, Pennsylvania, U.S.
- Burial place: Laurel Hill Cemetery
- Occupation: Publisher
- Known for: Co-owner of the Public Ledger

George William Childs (May 12, 1829 – February 3, 1894) was an American publisher who co-owned the Public Ledger newspaper in Philadelphia with financier Anthony Joseph Drexel.

== Early life ==
Childs was born in Baltimore, Maryland, on May 12, 1829, the illegitimate son of unidentified parents. He was raised by a likewise unidentified aunt in comfortable circumstances, a fact he later concealed to make his rise from obscurity seem more remarkable. He began work at age 12 in a bookstore for $2 per week while attending public school. He entered the Navy, at age 13 and served 15 months at Norfolk. After leaving the Navy in 1843, he moved to Philadelphia, and worked as a bookshop clerk at age 14. Childs found favor with his employer, proving himself to be trustworthy in business. After shutting the shop for the evening, he was entrusted with buying books at auction for the store. By the time he was 16, he was going to New York and Boston to attend publishing trade shows.

When Childs turned 18, he took his savings, which amounted to several hundred dollars, and leased space in the offices of the Philadelphia Public Ledger and started his own firm. While working on building his business, Childs was noted for frequently commenting on his desire to own the Ledger some day.

At age 21, Childs was offered a partnership in the publishing firm of R. E. Peterson & Co (established by Robert Evans Peterson) which he accepted, and the name of the firm was changed to Childs & Peterson. Childs & Peterson grew prosperous by publishing useful if unexciting titles that reached a broad market. Peterson excelled in scientific knowledge, while Childs provided business acumen. The two partners grew the title Familiar Science into a 200,000-issue sale by interesting schools in using it as a textbook. A marketing genius, Childs was the first book publisher to use the now ubiquitous "blurb" endorsements by other famous persons, and he conceived the notion of the author's book tour.

Childs was known throughout his life for generosity and philanthropy. He was quoted to say, "Meanness is not necessary to success in business, but economy is." This approach won him a wide circle of friends whose affection and friendship ran deep.

Childs was married to Emma B. Peterson, the granddaughter of Judge John Bouvier, a jurist born in Codognan, France. Her father was Robert Evans Peterson, a lawyer, and scientist; her mother was Hannah Mary Bouvier, author of Familiar Astronomy and collaborator with her husband on other works. They left no children.

== The Public Ledger Newspaper ==
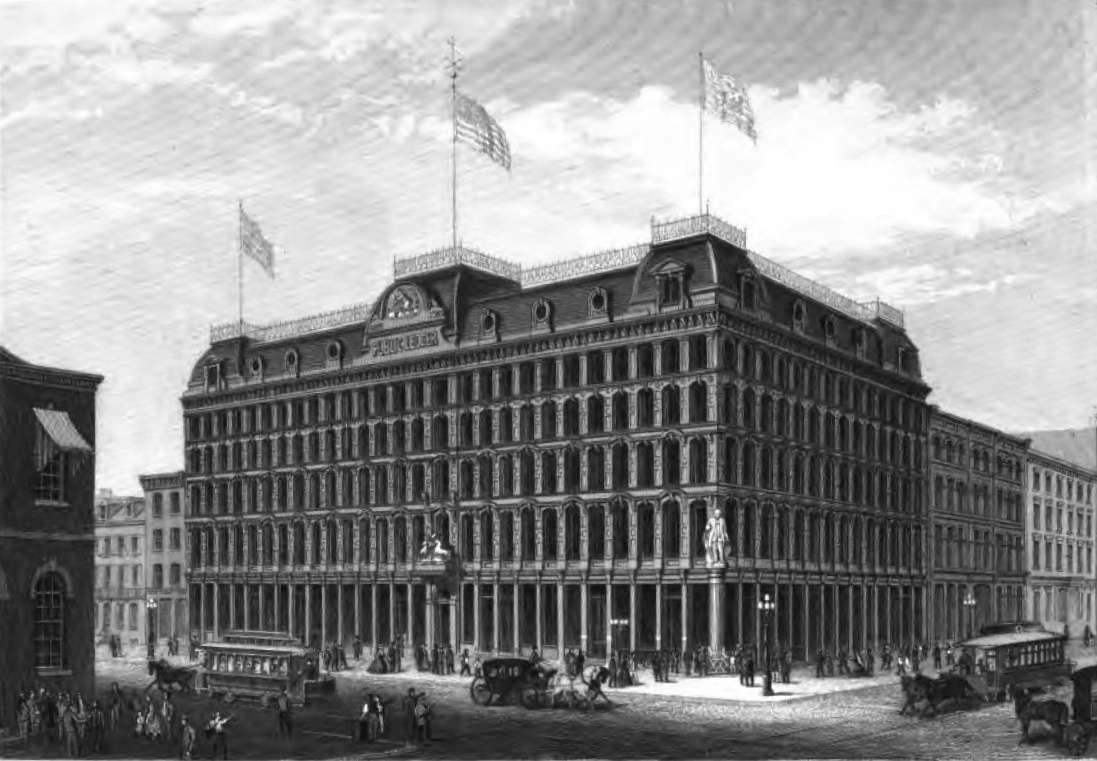
The Public Ledger Building as it appeared when it opened in June 1867

On December 5, 1864, with Anthony J. Drexel, he purchased the Philadelphia Public Ledger, at that time a money-losing newspaper, losing about $150,000 per year. The business was squeezed by rising paper and printing costs due to wartime shortages as the country engaged in the Civil War. The paper had lost circulation by supporting the Copperhead Policy of opposing the American Civil War and advocating an immediate peace settlement with the Confederate States. Most readers in Philadelphia at the time supported the Union. Publishers were reluctant to increase the one-cent subscription cost to cover the actual costs of production in the face of declining circulation. Childs bought the paper for a reported $20,000.

Upon buying the paper Childs completely changed its policy and methods. He changed the editorial policy to the Loyalist (Union) line, raised advertising rates, and he doubled the cover price to two cents. After an initial drop, circulation rebounded and the paper resumed profitability. Childs was intimately involved in all operations of the paper, from the press room to the composing room, and he intentionally upgraded the quality of advertisements appearing in the publication to suit a higher end readership. For four years he rarely left the paper before midnight.

Childs' efforts bore fruit and the Ledger became one of the most influential journals in the country. Circulation growth led the firm to outgrow its facilities, and in 1866 Childs bought property at Sixth and Chestnut Streets in Philadelphia and constructed the Public Ledger Building, which was called at the time "the finest newspaper office in the country." It was estimated that toward the end of Childs' association the Ledger was generating profits of approximately $500,000 per year.

== Other ventures ==
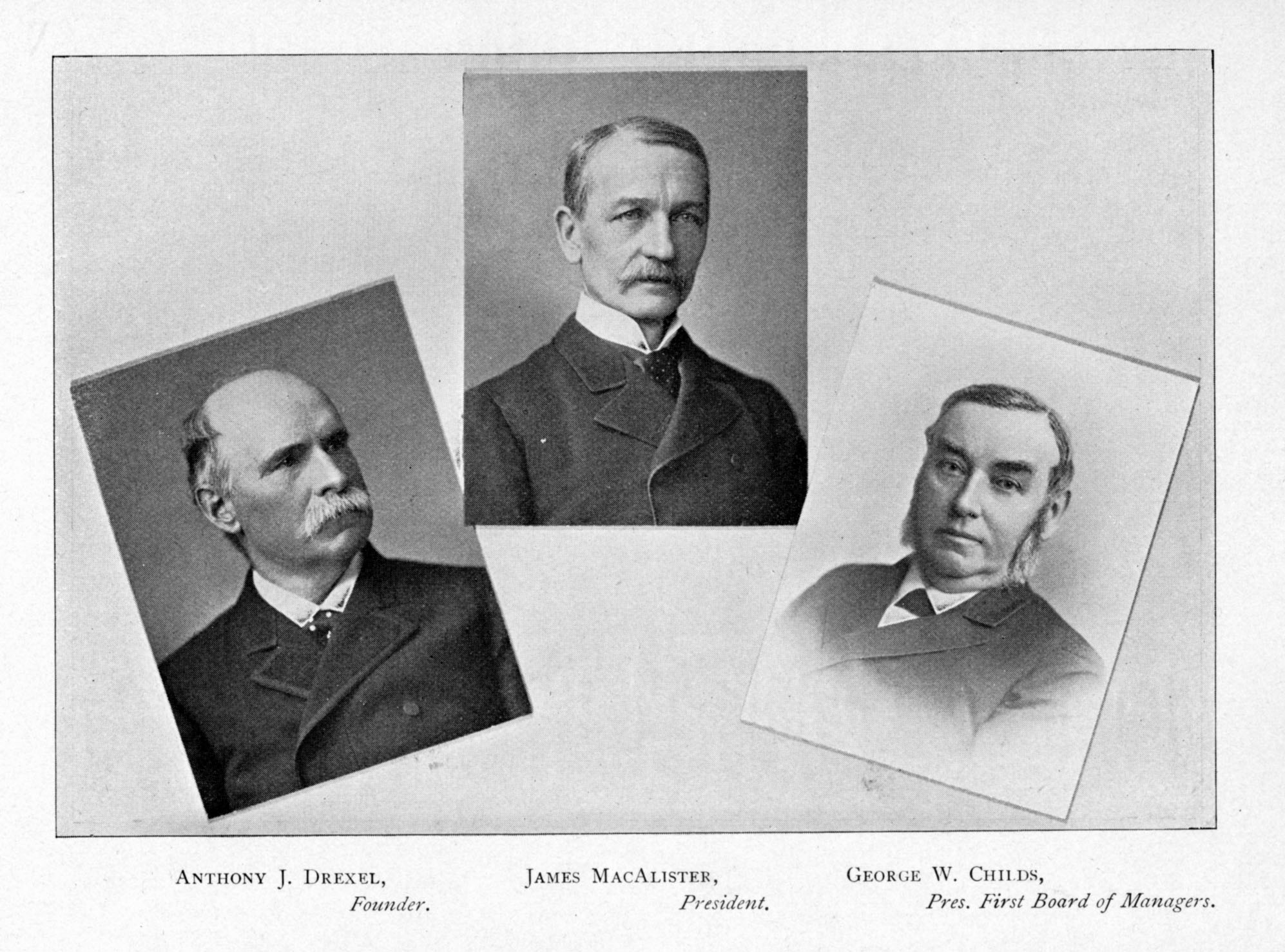
George W. Childs with Anthony Drexel and James MacAlister.

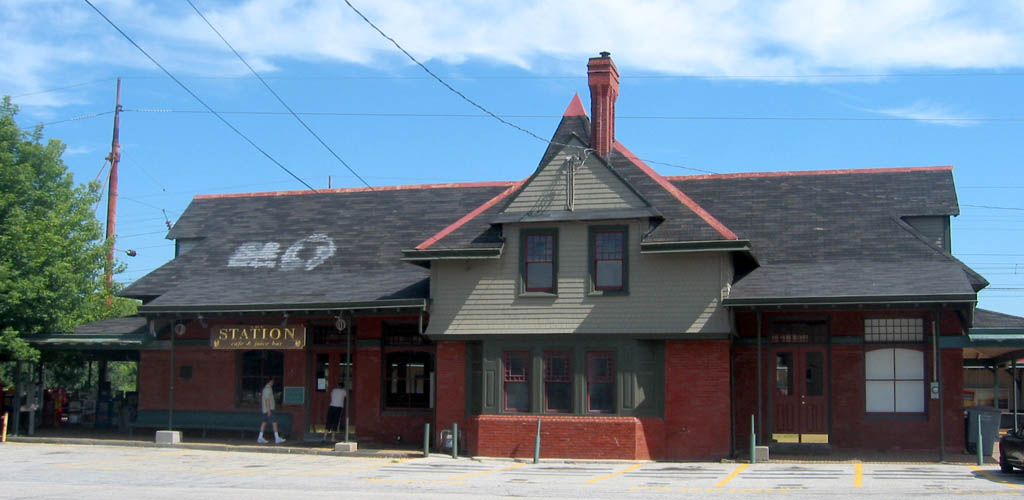
Wayne, Pennsylvania train station on the main line of the Pennsylvania Railroad

Close friends with Anthony Drexel for more than 40 years, Childs served as the second President of the Board of Trustees of Drexel University, succeeding the founder. In 1872, he was elected a member of the American Antiquarian Society. The Antiquarian Society holds a substantial file of original issues of the Public Ledger encompassing over 11,000 issues between 1836 and 1876. He was elected as a member to the American Philosophical Society in 1886.

In 1880 Childs and Drexel purchased 300 acres (1.2 km^{2}) west of Philadelphia along the tracks of the Pennsylvania Railroad, an area which was to become known as the Philadelphia Main Line, from banker J.H. Askin. The two laid out roads, public utilities, community amenities, churches, and building lots to create "Wayne Estate", later the unincorporated community of Wayne, Pennsylvania, an early example of a planned community.

The suburban village known as Wayne, on the Pennsylvania Railroad, fourteen miles from Philadelphia, differs so much from the ordinary town allowed to grow up hap-hazard and to develop conveniences as population increases, that it is necessary, in describing it as it appears, to keep in mind some facts about its history. Wayne is not an accidental aggregation of cottages; it is a town built by design, and provided at the start with all the conveniences to which residents of cities are accustomed and which they are so apt to miss and long for when they go into the country or even into the suburbs of a great city. The scheme of the town was well thought out and planned before any of the new cottages were built, and, as it was undertaken by liberal gentlemen of abundant means, no expense was spared in the preliminary municipal work.

Childs built his own summer home, Wooton, outside of nearby Bryn Mawr. A 2013 article on Childs described the estate:

Situated on almost 170 acres on Bryn Mawr Avenue in Radnor Township, the Wootton estate included a 50-room Tudor mansion, a clock tower, stables, pool, tennis courts, log cabins and several more buildings. The mansion was built in 1881 by architect John McArthur, who also designed Philadelphia’s City Hall.

After Childs died childless, his godson George W. Childs Drexel owned Wooton. In 1950, the estate was acquired for use as St. Aloysius Academy, a private school for boys. The mansion at Wooton continues in use, as do several outbuildings from the original estate.

Childs was also a very close friend of President Ulysses S. Grant, and they owned adjacent summer homes in Long Branch, New Jersey. When the dying Grant was struggling to complete his war memoirs to support his family after his death, he asked Childs to decide which firm should publish the work. Childs chose Charles L. Webster & Co., in which Mark Twain was a principal. In 1887 a movement arose to draft Childs himself for the presidency, but on January 25, 1888, he announced in the New York Times, "I am not a candidate and neither would I accept the (Republican) nomination for President."

== Philanthropy ==
Childs was widely known for his public spirit and philanthropy. In 1884, for example, he loaned $500 to poet Walt Whitman to help him purchase his home in Camden, New Jersey. In addition to numerous private benefactions in educational and charitable fields, he erected memorial windows to William Cowper and George Herbert in Westminster Abbey (1877), and to John Milton in St. Margaret's, Westminster (1888), a monument to Leigh Hunt at Kensal Green, a William Shakespeare memorial fountain at Stratford-on-Avon (1887), and a monument to Richard A. Proctor. In 1875, he gave the final donation to complete the Edgar Allan Poe monument in Baltimore. He gave Woodland Cemetery to the Typographical Society of Philadelphia for a printer's burial ground, and with Anthony J. Drexel founded in 1892 a home for Union printers at Colorado Springs, Colorado. He paid for the erection of Prayerbook Cross in San Francisco's Golden Gate Park. He was a founding member of the Philobiblon Club of Philadelphia in 1893.

== Legacy ==
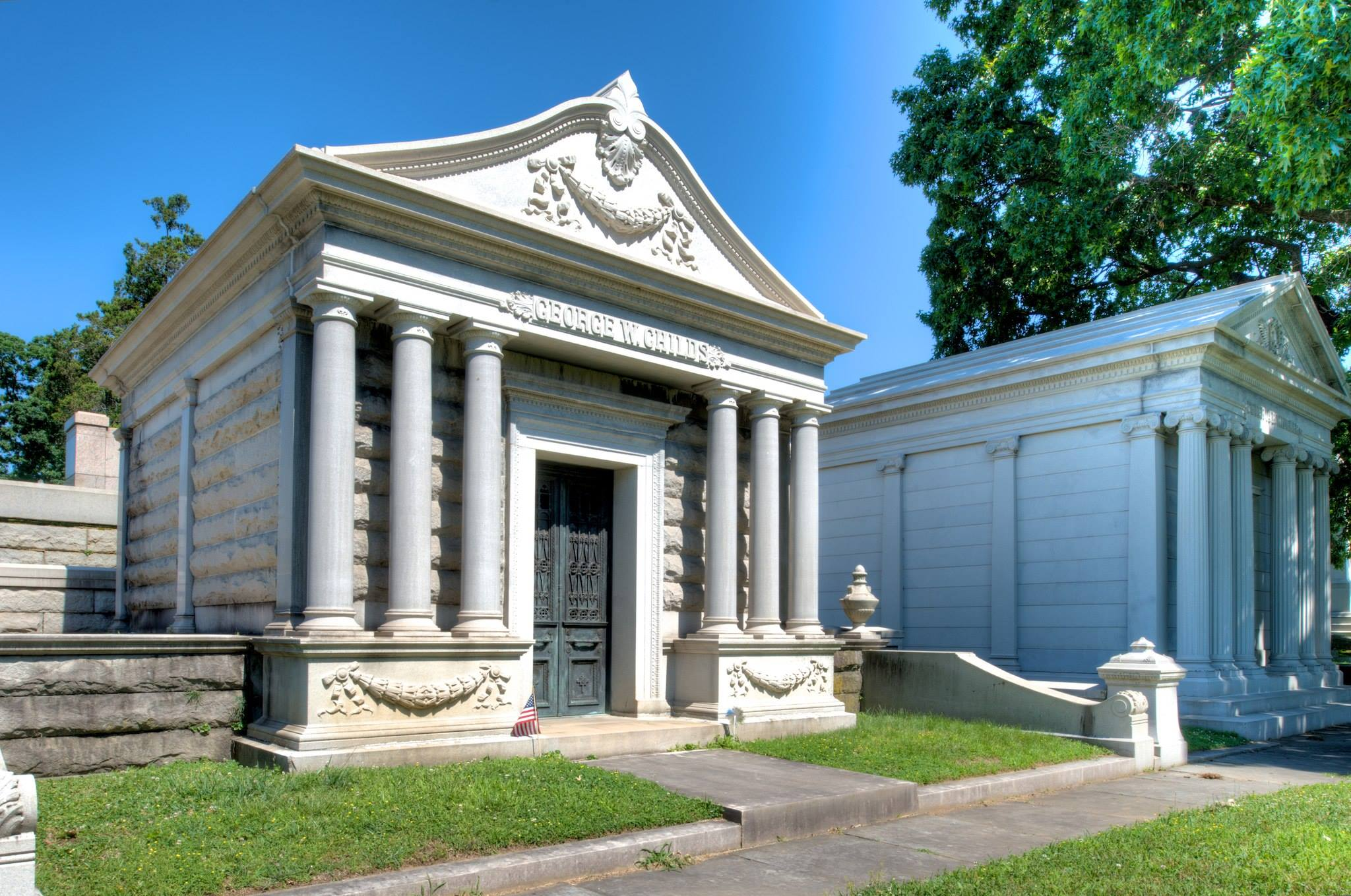
George W. Childs Mausoleum, Laurel Hill Cemetery

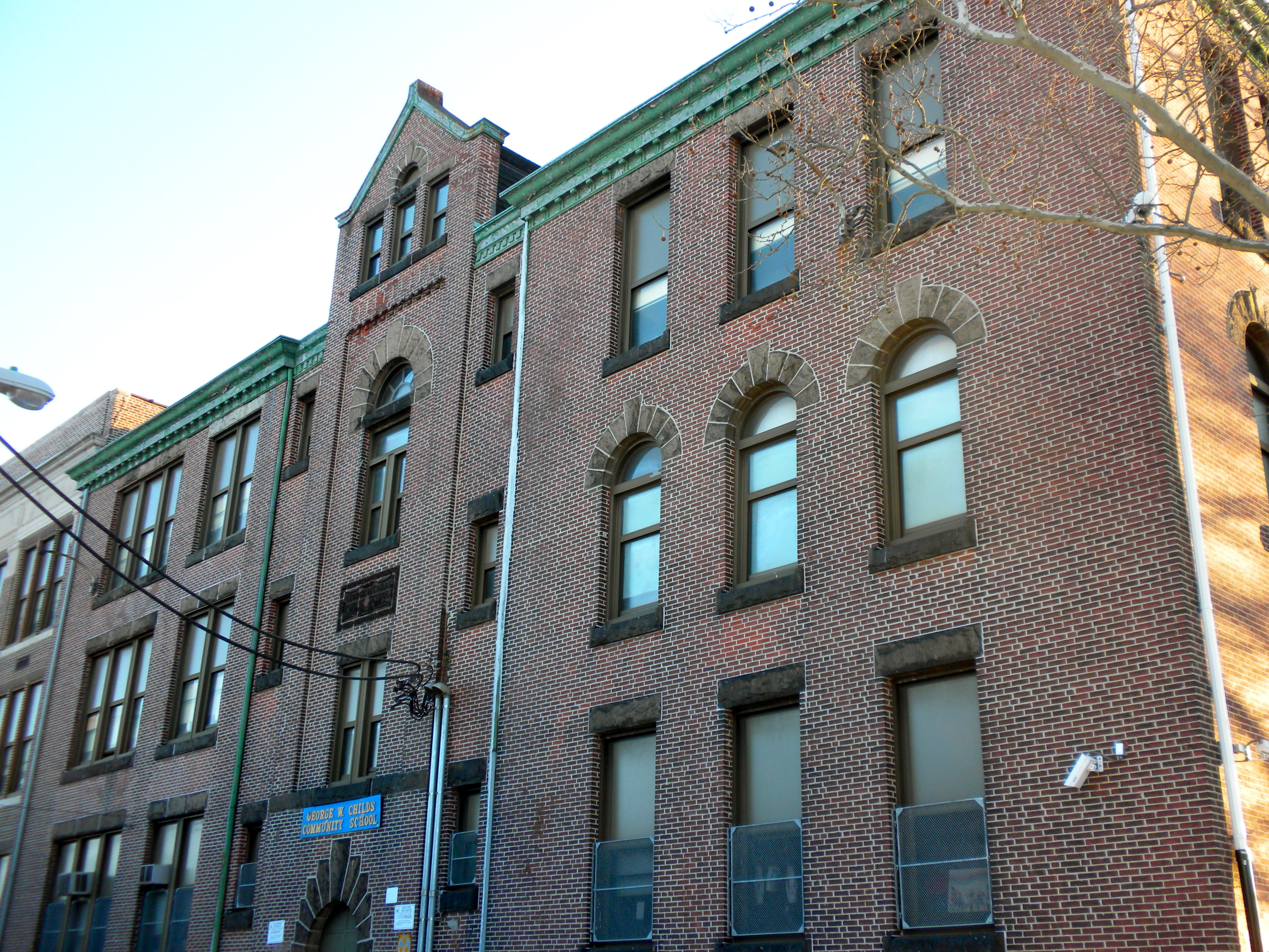
The former George W. Childs School in South Philadelphia, now an apartment building

Childs died at Philadelphia on February 3, 1894. His wife died at the Bellevue-Stratford Hotel in Philadelphia on August 13, 1928 at age 88. His Recollections were published at Philadelphia in 1890, and an elementary school in Philadelphia is named after him, as is the George W. Childs Recreation Site, in Pike County, Pennsylvania and Childs, Maryland. George and Emma are interred in a mausoleum in Laurel Hill Cemetery, Philadelphia.

Upon his death his employees at the Public Ledger adopted the following resolution:

The employees of the Public Ledger, having lost by the death of George W. Childs one who has stood to them in the relation of a kind and considerate father, find it impossible to express in formal resolutions the due sense of their great loss, but nevertheless seek to record in this minute their high appreciation of his character as it has been revealed to them in daily intercourse. He was the embodiment of kindness and benevolence; his broad sympathies made him a citizen of the world, and not merely those associated with him socially and in business, but humanity itself, lost a generous friend and noble exemplar by his death.
