= Matthew Henry Wilson =

British-American painter (1814–1892)

Matthew Henry Wilson (1814–February 23, 1892) was a British-American painter of portraits, landscapes, and miniatures. He is most notable as the artist who painted the last living portrait of Abraham Lincoln, completed just two weeks before his assassination.

He was born in London, England. At age 18, he came to the United States, arriving and settling in Philadelphia, Pennsylvania. He went on to study under Henry Inman, a prominent early 19th-century American artist. In 1835, he went to Paris, where he studied under Édouard Dubufe, before returning to the United States.

In 1864, he settled in Brooklyn, but during the Civil War spent time in Washington, DC, painting portraits of well-known persons.

He died in 1892 in Brooklyn but was buried in Philadelphia.

== Gallery ==
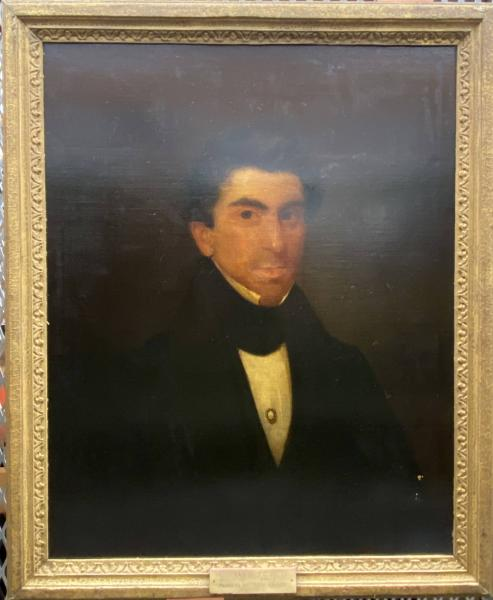
Peter Van Pelt Coppuck (1805–1869)

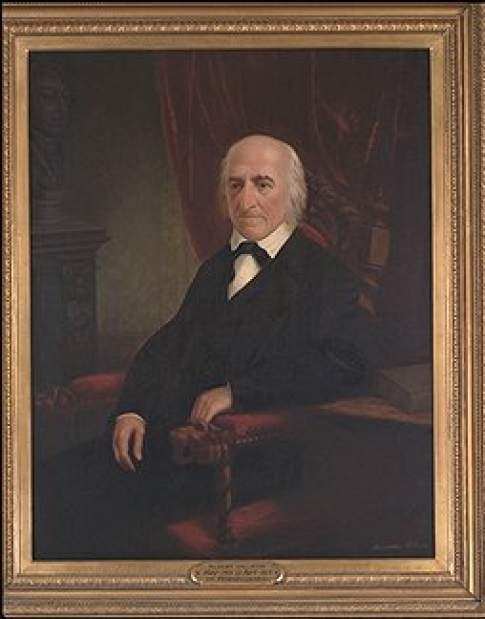
Albert Gallatin, 1879

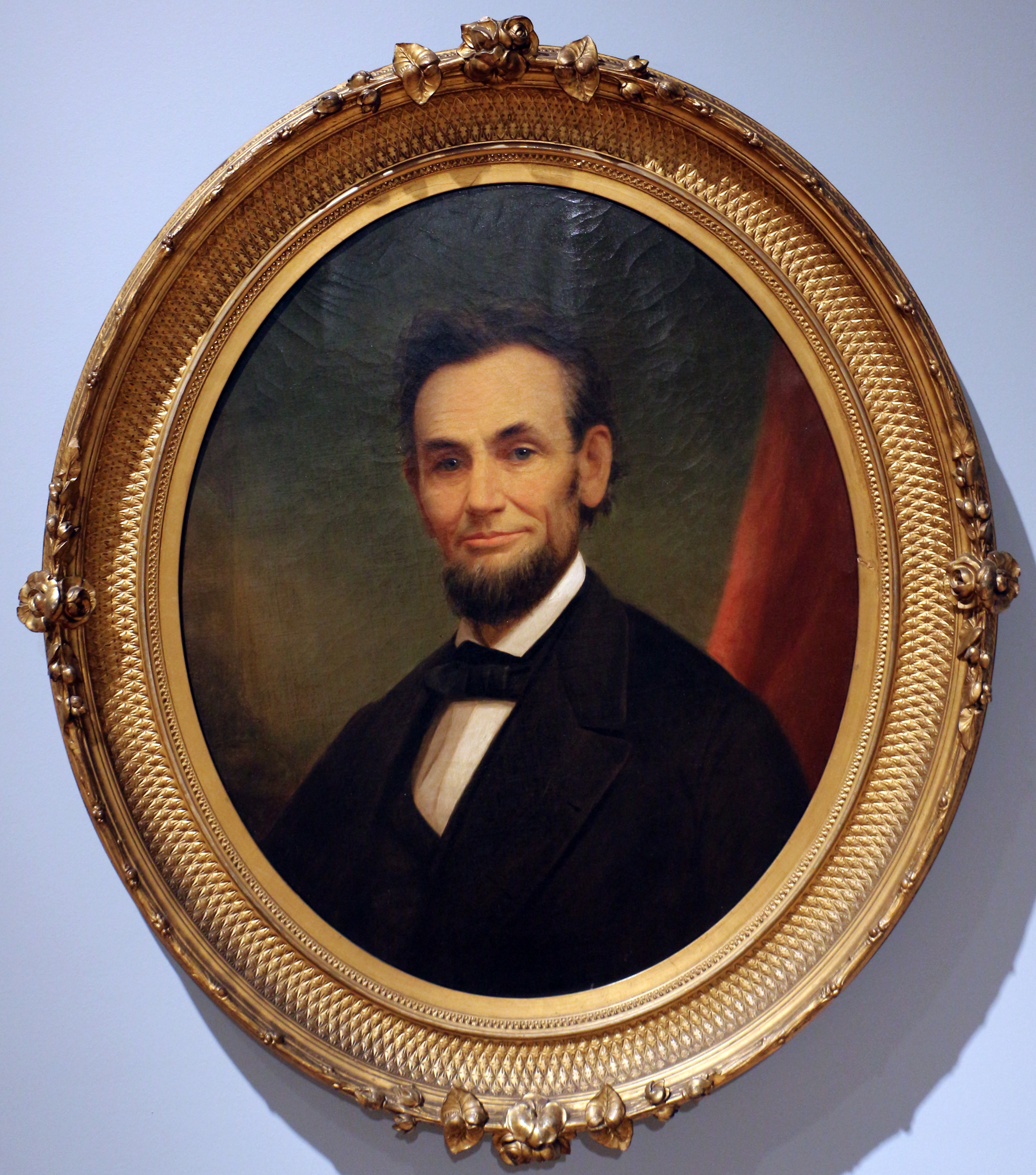
Abraham Lincoln, 1865
