= Hannah Mary Bouvier Peterson =

American textbook author (1811-1870)

- Born: 1811 Philadelphia, Pennsylvania, U.S.
- Died: September 4, 1870 (aged 58–59) Long Branch, New Jersey
- Resting place: Laurel Hill Cemetery, Philadelphia, Pennsylvania, U.S.
- Subject: Science, astronomy, cookery
- Spouse: Robert Evans Peterson

Hannah Mary Bouvier Peterson (1811 – September 4, 1870) was an American writer of books on science, astronomy and cookery. Most of her works were published anonymously or under her maiden name. Bouvier's Familiar Astronomy "for the use of schools, families and private students", went through multiple editions in the United States and England and was highly acclaimed. Familiar Science, originally credited to her husband, was also popular and adopted in schools. Cookbooks such as The National Cook Book and The Young Wife's Cook Book were widely reprinted. Her books share a common focus on writing for an American audience.

== Early life and education ==
Hannah Mary Bouvier was the daughter of John Bouvier, a Philadelphia lawyer and legal writer, and Elizabeth Widdifield. She was educated at private schools in Philadelphia, in painting, music and linguistics.

== Career ==
Peterson tended to publish anonymously or under her maiden name, Hannah Bouvier. A preface to a later edition of The National Cook Book, written by her husband after her death, indicates that 'When this work was prepared for the Press, she declined to let her name appear as the author, from her great dislike to notoriety, observing "that a woman should never be known outside of her own home."' In addition to this preface, the title page identifies her as the author, and gives her credit for other works. These include Familiar Science; or, The Scientific Explanation of Common Things (1851), which originally credited her husband as its editor. Familiar Science reorganized and expanded upon A Guide to the Scientific Knowledge of Things Familiar by Ebenezer Cobham Brewer, adapting it for an American audience. It sold widely and was adopted for use in schools. As of 1866, over 200,000 copies had been sold, and it was being used in public schools in Philadelphia and Brooklyn.

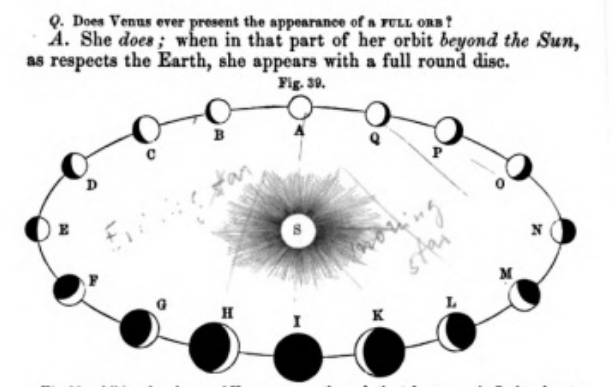
"Does Venus ever present the appearance of a full orb?", Familiar astronomy

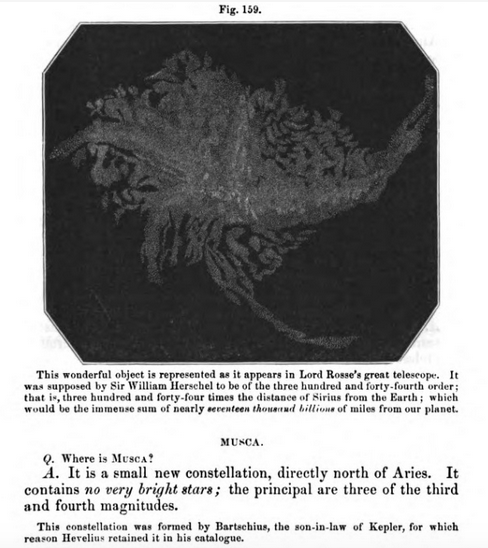
"Where is Musca?", Familiar astronomy

Her astronomical writing was published under her maiden name, Bouvier, and dedicated to her father, John Bouvier. Her "great work", Bouvier's Familiar Astronomy: or, An Introduction to the Study of the Heavens (1855) was intended "for the use of schools, families and private students". In the preface, she elaborates further:

This work, embracing all the recent observations of the heavenly bodies, is intended to be a complete treatise on Astronomy, conducting the pupil, step by step, from the base to the summit of the structure; explaining as far as practicable, by figures and diagrams, all the celestial phenomena, and the laws by which they are governed, without entering into those mathematical details which properly belong to treatises designed for those who propose to make Astronomy their chief study.

Bouvier's Familiar Astronomy incorporates a question-and-answer format used in Familiar Science and in the works of science educator Jane Marcet. Nearly 500 pages long, it manages to be at once comprehensive, succinct and readable. The book covers physical, descriptive, sidereal, and practical aspects of astronomy, along with a treatise on globes, a history of astronomy, an astronomical dictionary, notes and an index. Her treatment of the subject indicates that Hannah Bouvier was widely read, with broad knowledge of her field and considerable skill in organizing and presenting her material. The book includes over 200 engravings, many of which may have been prepared by Bouvier herself.

Familiar astronomy received and published letters of appreciation from respected astronomers including John F.W. Herschel, Matthew F. Maury, William C. Bond, and Benjamin A. Gould. The original edition is known to have been republished in 1855, 1856 and 1857, and in two "cheap" editions in 1858, one of which was considerably condensed.

Most of her cookbooks were published as being by "A Lady of Philadelphia", although at least one edition gives her maiden name, and identifies her as the author of both Familiar Science and Bouvier's Astronomy. The National Cook Book, like her works on science and astronomy, and her father's works on law, identified itself as intended for an American audience. Although it included recipes such as French beef a la mode and Spanish fritters, she explicitly stated that "nearly all the recipes here are purely American".

The Young Wife's Cook Book includes not only "the best dishes to be prepared for Breakfast, Dinner, and Tea" but everything from tea cakes and jellies to terrapin and lobster. It was described by Godey's Lady's Book as "An excellent book of thoroughly tested receipts, which will prove highly satisfactory to the novice in cooking." The author emphasizes the importance of domestic economy, and includes recipes for "heart, liver, tripe, feet" and the reuse of leftovers, a theme she also addressed in The Family Save-All. She encourages wives to manage their time, to ensure that they have opportunities for the practice of accomplishments and "cultivation of the mind".

Hannah Mary Bouvier Peterson died September 4, 1870, in Long Branch, New Jersey, home of her daughter Emma and son-in-law, George William Childs. She was interred at Laurel Hill Cemetery in Philadelphia.

== Family ==
Bouvier married Robert Evans Peterson, the eldest son of publisher George Peterson, on September 3, 1834. Both her family and her husband's family were Quakers, and the marriage took place at the Monthly Meeting on Cherry Street, Philadelphia. Robert Peterson studied law with his father-in-law and was admitted to the bar in 1843. He established the Philadelphia publishing house R. E. Peterson & Co. around 1850, which became Childs & Peterson around 1854. He later studied medicine at the University of Pennsylvania, graduating with an M.D. in 1863. The couple had two children, Robert Evans Peterson, Jr., and Emma Bouvier Peterson. They spent summers in Crosswicks, New Jersey. Robert taught Hannah advanced mathematics, supported her interests in the sciences, and encouraged her to write and publish.

== Bibliography ==
=== General science ===
- Familiar Science; or, The Scientific Explanation of Common Things Edited by R. E. Peterson. Philadelphia: Robert E. Peterson & co., 1851. Later reprinted as Peterson's Familiar Science or, The Scientific Explanation of Common Things.

=== Astronomy ===
- Bouvier's familiar astronomy : or, An introduction to the study of the heavens; illustrated by upwards of two hundred finely executed engravings; for the use of schools, families and private students. by Hannah M. Bouvier. Philadelphia : Sower, Barnes & Potts, 1855.
- Familiar astronomy, or, An introduction to the study of the heavens : illustrated by celestial maps, and upwards of 200 finely executed engravings; to which is added a treatise on the globes, and a comprehensive astronomical dictionary; for the use of schools, families, and private students. Philadelphia, London : Childs & Peterson, Trübner, 1856.

=== Cookery ===
- The National Cook Book. by a Lady of Philadelphia [Hannah Mary Bouvier Peterson]. Philadelphia: Robert E. Peterson, 1850.
- The National Cook Book. By A lady of Philadelphia [Hannah Mary Bouvier Peterson], A practical housewife [Martha Read]. Philadelphia, Hayes & Zell, 1856.
- The National Cook Book. By Hannah M. Bouvier. Author of "Familiar Science", "Bouvier's Astronomy", And A practical housewife. Philadelphia, T. B. Peterson & Brothers, [1870?], c1866.
- The family save-all. Supplying excellent dishes for breakfast, dinner and tea, from cold fragments... by the Author of "The national cook book". Philadelphia, T. B. Peterson & brothers, c1867.
- The young wife's cook book : with receipts of the best dishes for breakfast, dinner and tea by the author of "The national cook book". Philadelphia : T.B. Peterson & Brothers, 1870.
