= Peterson's Magazine =

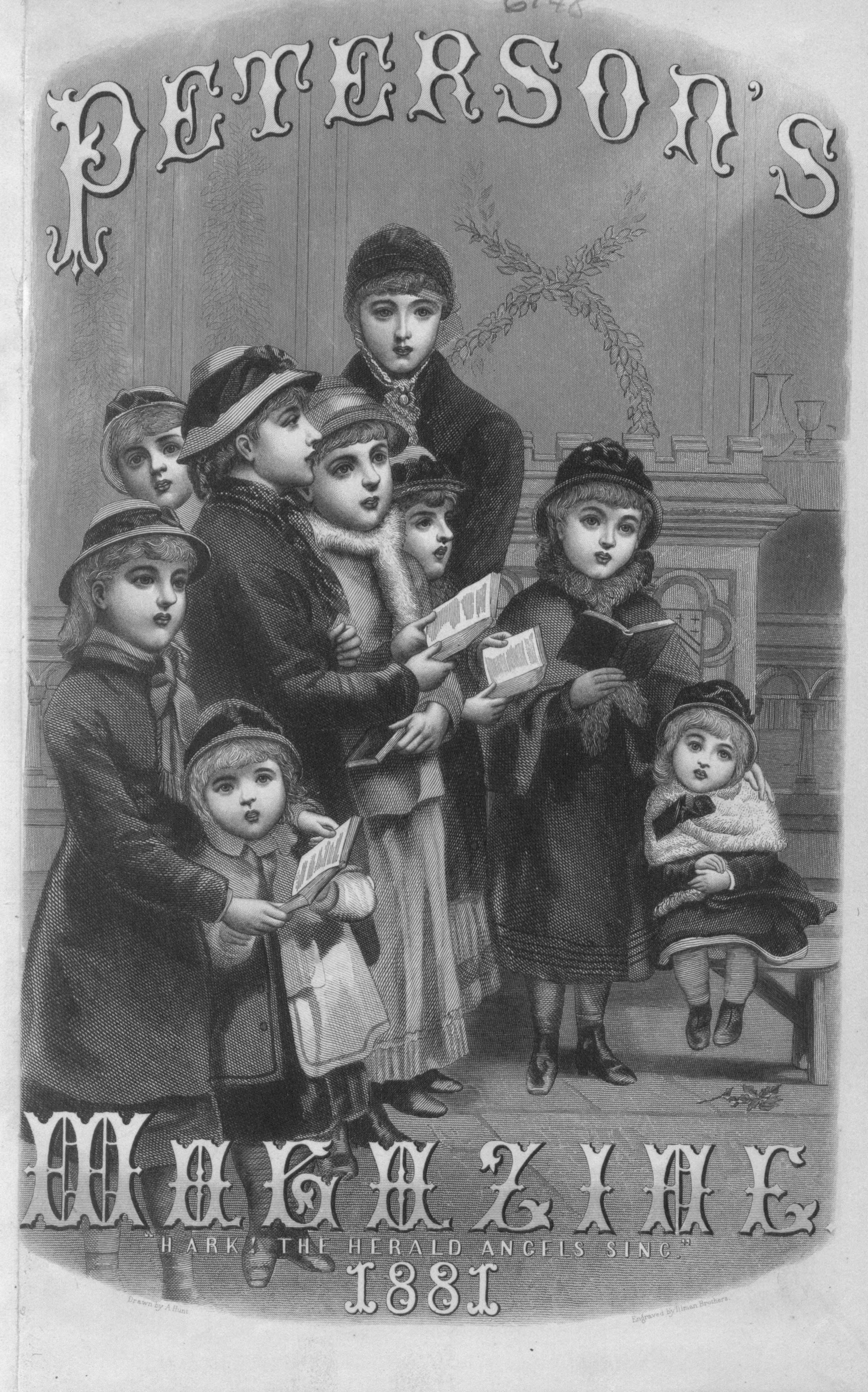
Cover of the 1881 volume of the magazine

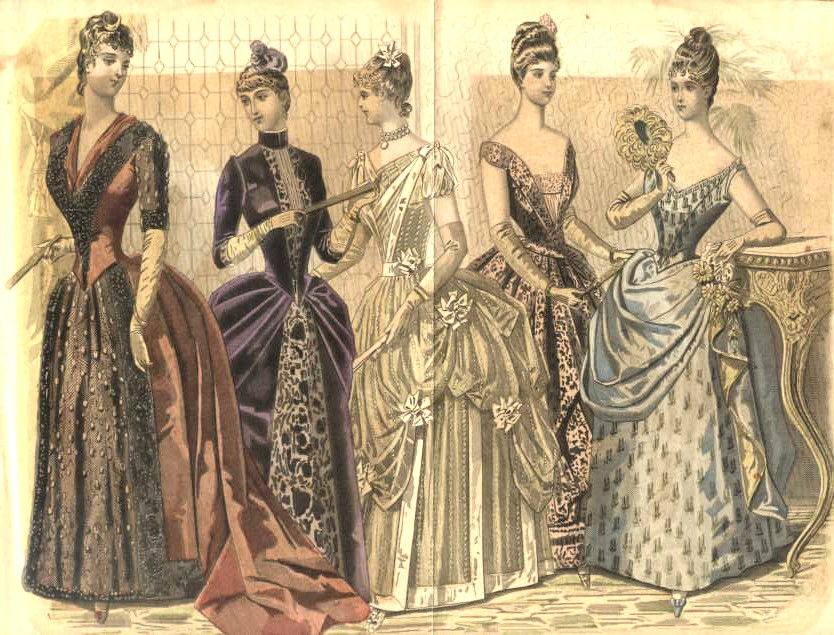
1888 fashion plate in Peterson's

Peterson's Magazine (1842–1898) was an American magazine focused on women. It was published monthly and based in Philadelphia.

In 1842, Charles Jacobs Peterson and George Rex Graham, partners in the Saturday Evening Post, agreed that a new women's journal to compete with Godey's Lady's Book would be a good venture. Peterson launched Ladies' National Magazine as a cheaper alternative to Godey's ($2 per year instead of $3) in January 1842. Ann S. Stephens was an early editor and substantial contributor to the periodical, and there was some attempt to portray her as running the show (for marketing purposes, perhaps), although Peterson was still in charge. Emily H. May was another early and frequent contributor. The name of the publication had some variation in its early years, but by 1848 was titled Peterson's Ladies' National Magazine, and the Peterson prefix would always remain. From 1855 to 1892, it was called Peterson's Magazine, and thus by that name it is remembered. By the 1870s, it had a circulation of 150,000.

Frank Munsey, the media consolidator, purchased the magazine in 1898, and combined it into Argosy magazine.
