= 1852 =

1852 in various calendars
- Gregorian calendar: 1852; MDCCCLII
- Ab urbe condita: 2605
- Armenian calendar: 1301; ԹՎ ՌՅԱ
- Assyrian calendar: 6602
- Baháʼí calendar: 8–9
- Balinese saka calendar: 1773–1774
- Bengali calendar: 1258–1259
- Berber calendar: 2802
- British Regnal year: 15 Vict. 1 – 16 Vict. 1
- Buddhist calendar: 2396
- Burmese calendar: 1214
- Byzantine calendar: 7360–7361
- Chinese calendar: 辛亥年 (Metal Pig); 4549 or 4342 — to — 壬子年 (Water Rat); 4550 or 4343
- Coptic calendar: 1568–1569
- Discordian calendar: 3018
- Ethiopian calendar: 1844–1845
- Hebrew calendar: 5612–5613
- Hindu calendars
- Vikram Samvat: 1908–1909
- Shaka Samvat: 1773–1774
- Kali Yuga: 4952–4953
- Holocene calendar: 11852
- Igbo calendar: 852–853
- Iranian calendar: 1230–1231
- Islamic calendar: 1268–1269
- Japanese calendar: Kaei 5 (嘉永５年)
- Javanese calendar: 1780–1781
- Julian calendar: Gregorian minus 12 days
- Korean calendar: 4185
- Minguo calendar: 60 before ROC 民前60年
- Nanakshahi calendar: 384
- Thai solar calendar: 2394–2395
- Tibetan calendar: ལྕགས་མོ་ཕག་ལོ་ (female Iron-Boar); 1978 or 1597 or 825 — to — ཆུ་ཕོ་བྱི་བ་ལོ་ (male Water-Rat); 1979 or 1598 or 826

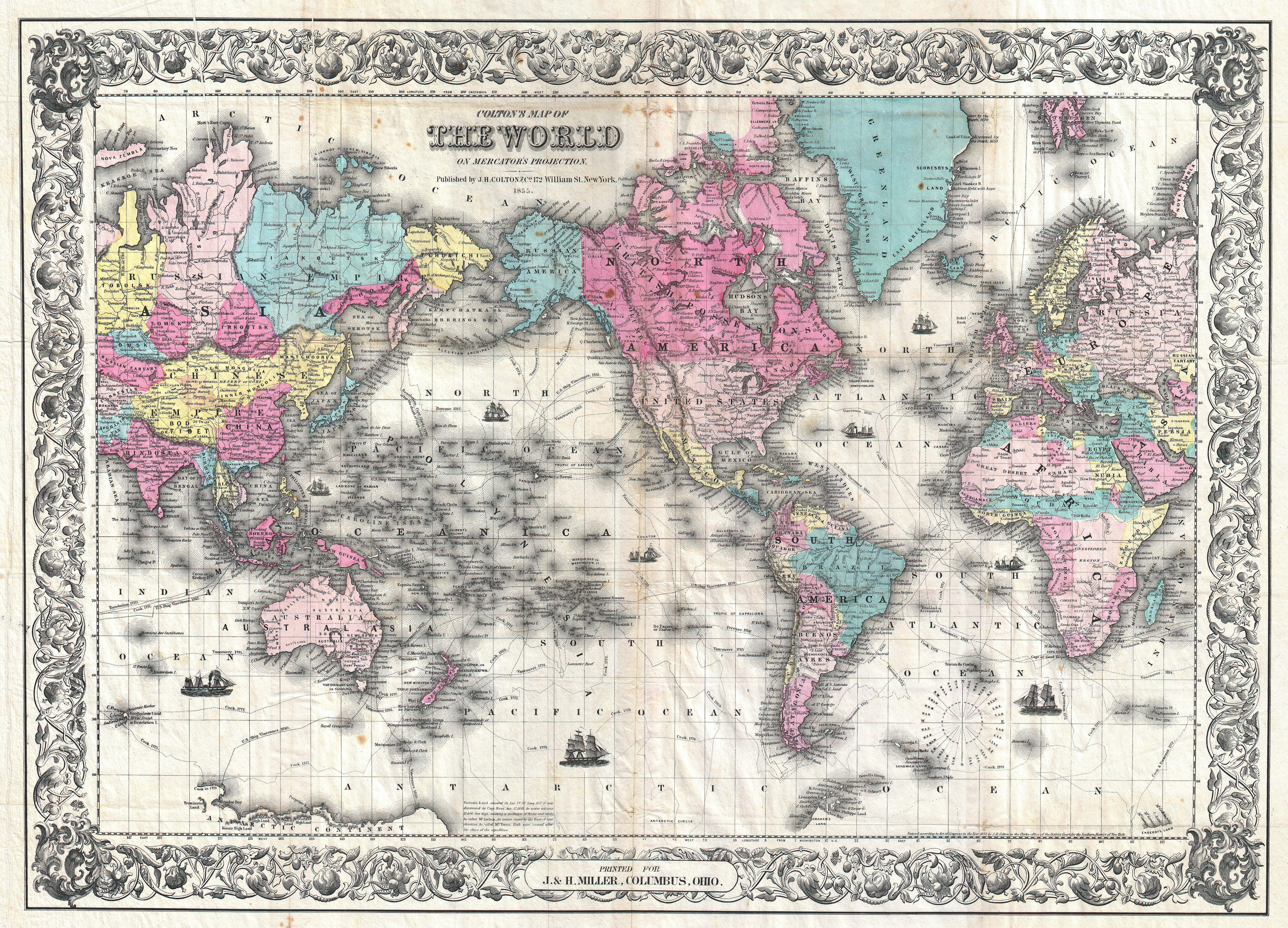
The world in 1852

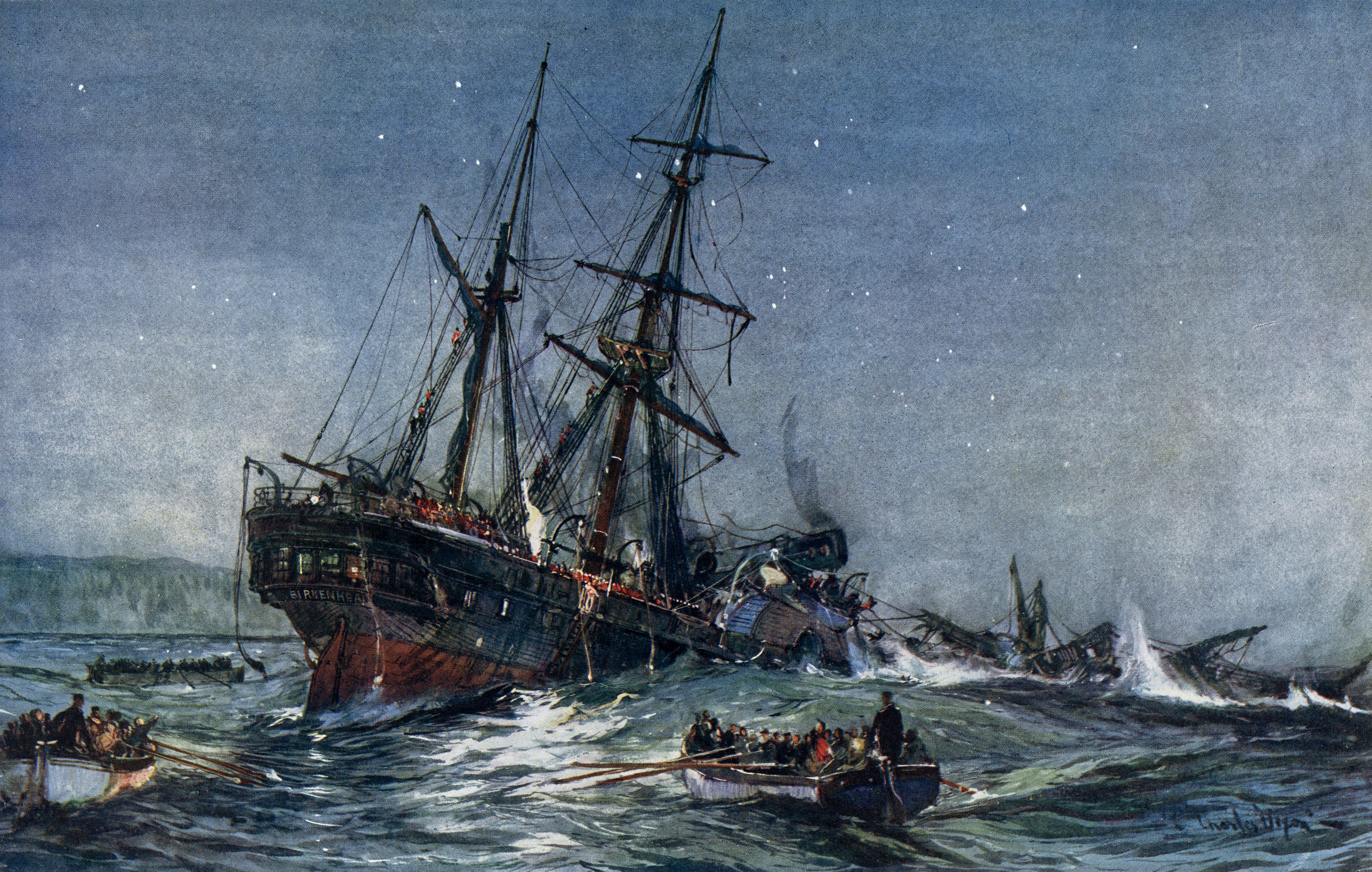
February 25: HMS Birkenhead sinks, killing 450 people but establishing the principle of "women and children first".

1852 (MDCCCLII) was a leap year starting on Thursday of the Gregorian calendar and a leap year starting on Tuesday of the Julian calendar, the 1852nd year of the Common Era (CE) and Anno Domini (AD) designations, the 852nd year of the 2nd millennium, the 52nd year of the 19th century, and the 3rd year of the 1850s decade. As of the start of 1852, the Gregorian calendar was 12 days ahead of the Julian calendar, which remained in localized use until 1923.

== Events ==
=== January–March ===
- January 14 – President Louis-Napoléon Bonaparte proclaims a new constitution for the French Second Republic.
- January 15 – Nine men representing various Jewish charitable organizations come together to form what will become Mount Sinai Hospital in New York City.
- January 17 – The United Kingdom recognizes the independence of the Transvaal.
- February 3 – Battle of Caseros, Argentina: The Argentine provinces of Entre Rios and Corrientes, allied with Brazil and members of Colorado Party of Uruguay, defeat Buenos Aires troops under Juan Manuel de Rosas.
- February 11 – The first British public toilet for women opens in Bedford Street, London.
- February 14 – The Great Ormond Street Hospital for Sick Children, London, admits its first patient.
- February 15 – The Helsinki Cathedral (known as St. Nicholas' Church at time) is officially inaugurated in Helsinki, Finland.
- February 16 – The Studebaker Brothers Wagon Company, precursor of the automobile manufacturer, is established in South Bend, Indiana.
- February 19 – Phi Kappa Psi fraternity is founded in Canonsburg, Pennsylvania, at Jefferson College.
- February 25 – HMS Birkenhead sinks near Cape Town, British Cape Colony. Only 193 of the 643 on board survive, after troops stand firm on the deck so as not to overwhelm the lifeboats containing women and children.
- March 1 – Archibald Montgomerie, 13th Earl of Eglinton, is appointed Lord Lieutenant of Ireland.
- March 2 – The first American experimental steam fire engine is tested.
- March 4 – Phi Mu sorority is founded in Macon, Georgia.
- March 17 – Annibale de Gasparis discovers the asteroid Psyche from the north dome of the Astronomical Observatory of Capodimonte in Naples.
- March 18 – Henry Wells and William Fargo create Wells Fargo & Company.
- March 20 – Uncle Tom's Cabin, by Harriet Beecher Stowe, is published in book form in Boston, Massachusetts.

=== April–June ===
- April 1 – The Second Anglo-Burmese War begins.
- April 18 – Taiping Rebellion in China: Taiping forces begin the siege of Guilin.
- May 19 – Taiping Rebellion: The siege of Guilin is lifted.
- June 12 – Taiping Rebellion: Taiping forces enter Hunan.
- June 30 – The New Zealand Constitution Act 1852 is passed by the Parliament of the United Kingdom to grant the British colony self-government with a representative constitution.

=== July–September ===
- July 1 – American statesman Henry Clay is the first to receive the honor of lying in state in the United States Capitol rotunda.
- July 5 – Frederick Douglass delivers his famous speech, "What to the Slave Is the Fourth of July?", in Rochester, New York.
- July 28 – Henry Clay steamboat disaster in Riverdale, Bronx, claims several lives, including Stephen Allen.
- August 3 – The first American intercollegiate athletic event, the Boat Race between Yale and Harvard, is held.
- August 23 – Boston missionary Reverend Benjamin Galen Snow lands on the island of Kosrae in the Caroline Islands (Micronesia) first to bring the gospel to the island.
- September 11 – Revolution of 11 September 1852 in Argentina: Buenos Aires Province declares independence.
- September 19 – Annibale de Gasparis discovers the asteroid Massalia from the north dome of the Astronomical Observatory of Capodimonte in Naples.
- September 24 – French engineer Henri Giffard makes the first airship trip, from Paris to Trappes.

=== October–December ===
- October 7 – After learning that U.S. President Fillmore has sent Commodore Matthew C. Perry to open trade with Japan, Nicholas I of Russia sends Rear Admiral Yevfimy Putyatin to lead the Pallada on a similar mission (Putyatin arrives on August 21, 1853, one month after Perry).
- October 16 – After nearly five years' imprisonment in France, former Algerian Emir Abdelkader El Djezairi is released by orders of then-president Louis-Napoléon Bonaparte.
- October 23 – The conjecture of the four color theorem is first proposed, as student Francis Guthrie of University College London presents the question of proving, mathematically, that no more than four colors are needed to give separate colors to bordering shapes on a map (the theorem is not proven for almost 123 years, until 1976).
- October 31 – General Joaquin Solares of Guatemala leads an invasion of neighboring Honduras, beginning a war that lasts until February 13, 1856.
- November – Leo Tolstoy's debut novel Childhood is published under the initials L. N., in this month's issue of the Saint Petersburg literary journal Sovremennik (and later in book form).
- November 2 – 1852 United States presidential election: Democrat Franklin Pierce of New Hampshire defeats Whig Winfield Scott of Virginia.
- November 4 – Camillo Benso, Count of Cavour becomes the Piedmontese prime minister.
- November 11 – The new Palace of Westminster opens in London as the home of the Parliament of the United Kingdom.
- November 21–22 – The New French Empire is confirmed by plebiscite: 7,824,000 for, 253,000 against.
- November 23 – The first roadside pillar boxes in the British Isles are brought into public use in Saint Helier, on Jersey in the Channel Islands, at the suggestion of English novelist Anthony Trollope, at this time an official of the British General Post Office.
- November 27 – A magnitude 7.5 to 8.8 earthquake strikes near the Banda Islands, Dutch East Indies, triggering a deadly tsunami.
- December – The Western Railroad is chartered to build a railroad from Fayetteville, North Carolina, to the coal fields of Egypt, North Carolina.
- December 2 – Napoleon III becomes Emperor of the French.
- December 4 – The French capture Laghouat.
- December 23 – Taiping Rebellion: The Taiping army takes Hanyang and begins the siege of Wuchang.
- December 29 – Taiping Rebellion: The Taiping army takes Hankou.

=== Date unknown ===
- The grooved rail is developed by Alphonse Loubat.
- The Devil's Island penal colony opens in the colony of French Guiana.
- The semaphore line in France is superseded by the telegraph.
- Smith & Wesson is founded as a firearms manufacturer in the United States.
- In Hawaii, sugar planters bring over the first Chinese laborers on 3- or 5-year contracts, giving them 3 dollars per month plus room and board for working a 12-hour day, 6 days a week.
- Germans are encouraged to immigrate to Chile.
- The British Inman Line is the first to offer United States-bound migrants steerage passage in a steamer, SS City of Glasgow.
- Loyola College is chartered in Baltimore, Maryland.
- Antioch College is founded in Yellow Springs, Ohio (its first president is Horace Mann).
- Mills College is founded as the Young Ladies Seminary in Benicia, California.
- The French Catholic De La Salle Brothers arrive from Europe in Singapore, aboard La Julie, and sail up to Penang in the Straits Settlements, to found the first Lasallian educational institutions in Asia.
- Justin Perkins, an American Presbyterian missionary, produces the first translation of the Bible in Assyrian Neo-Aramaic, which is published with the parallel text of the Syriac Peshitta, by the American Bible Society.

== Births ==
=== January–March ===
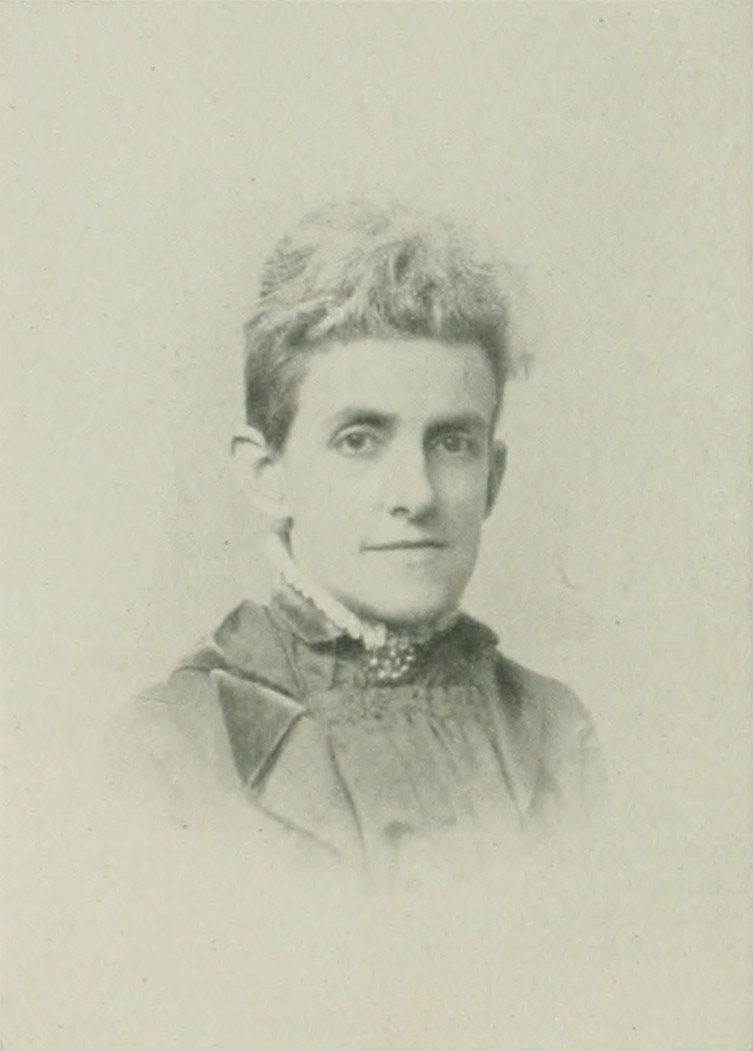
Elnora Monroe Babcock

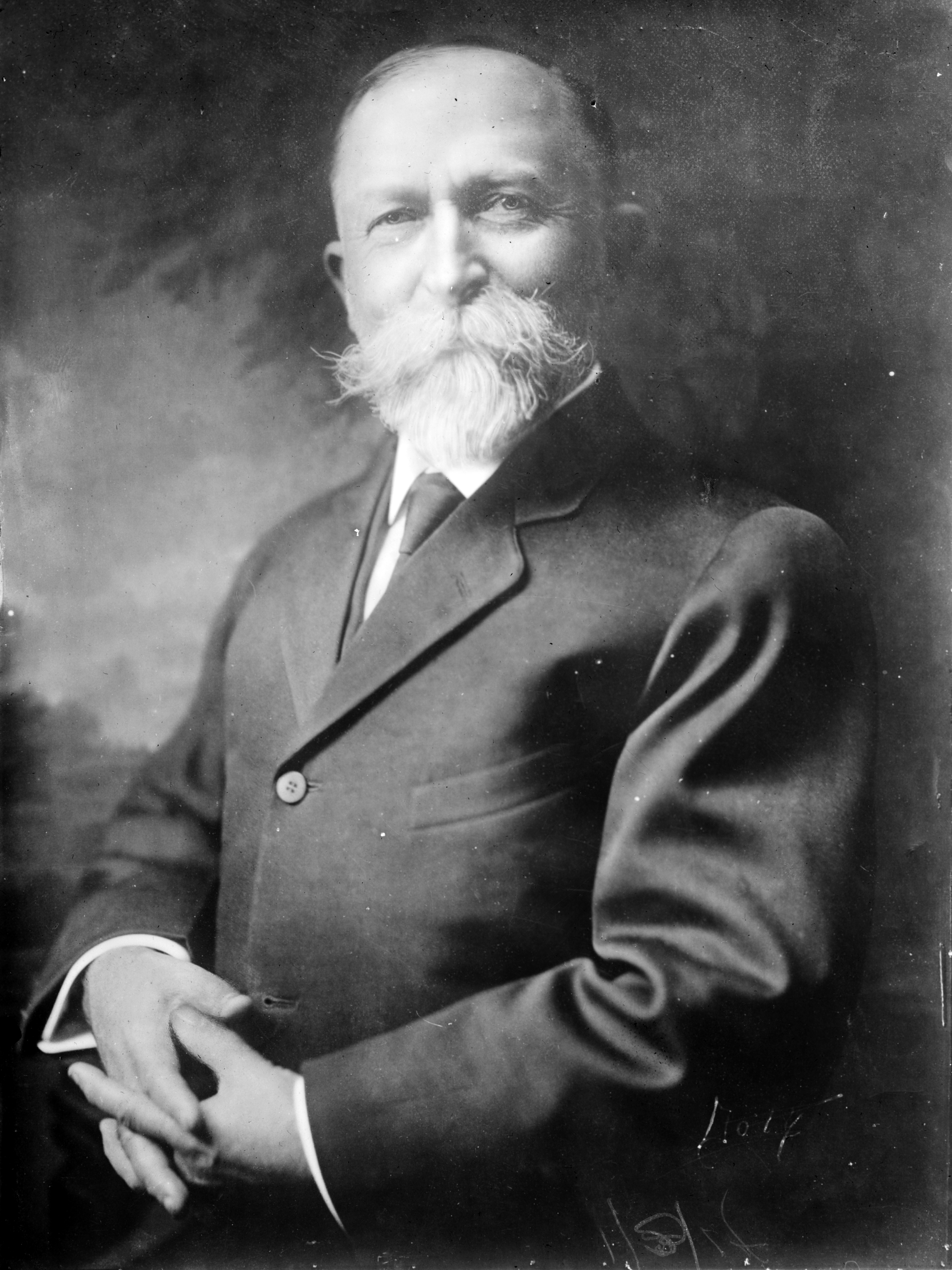
John Harvey Kellogg

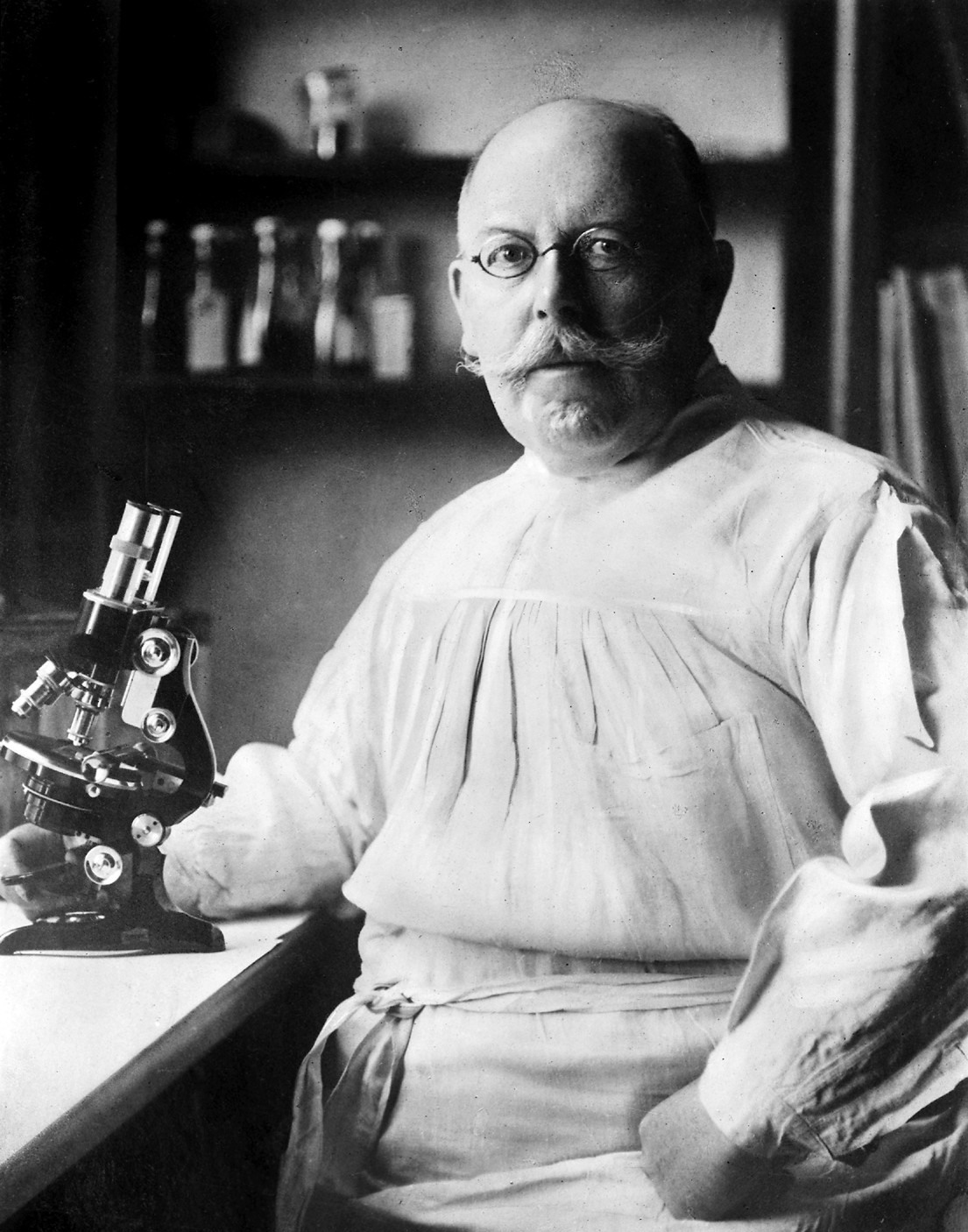
Friedrich Loeffler

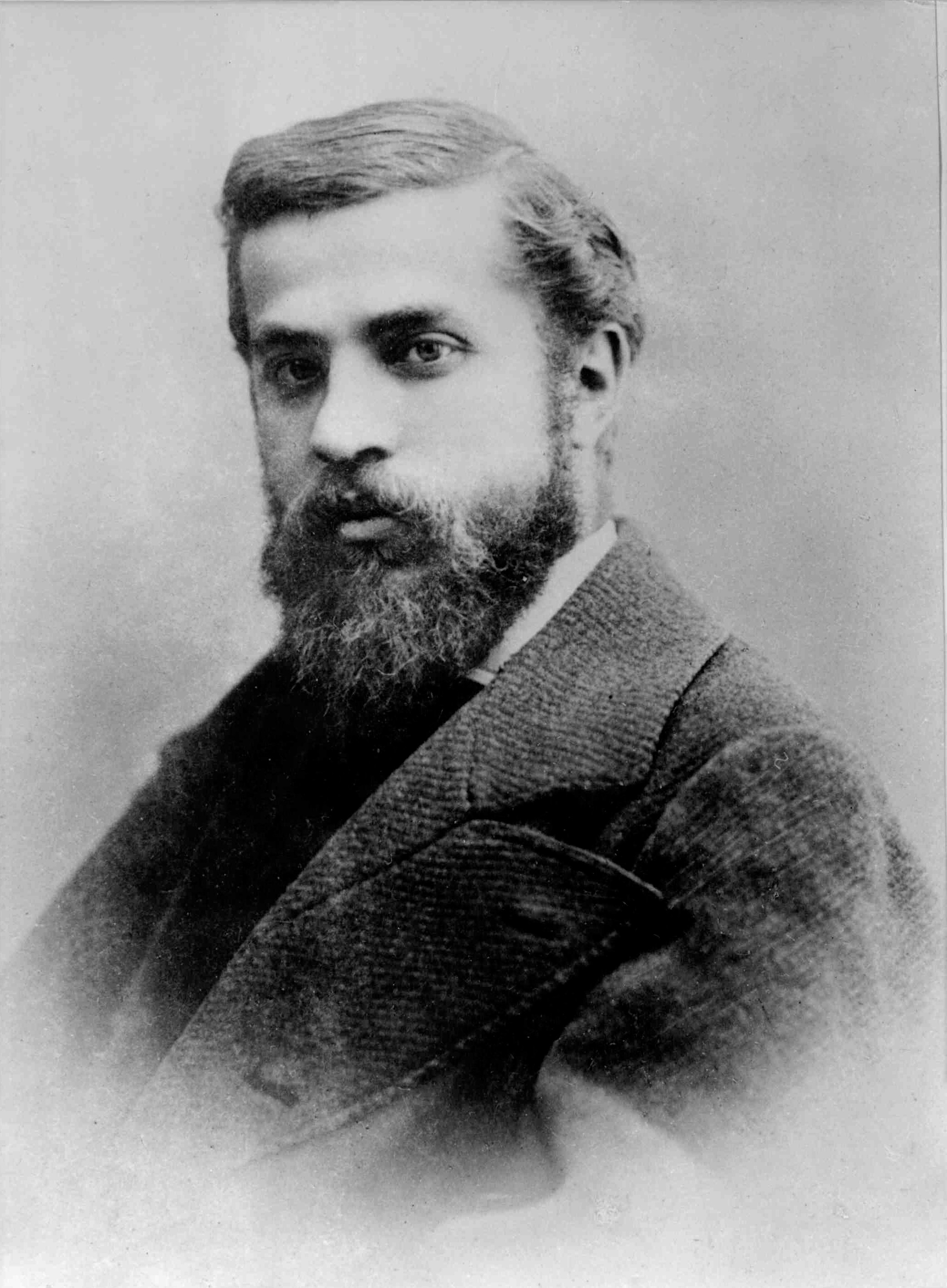
Antoni Gaudi

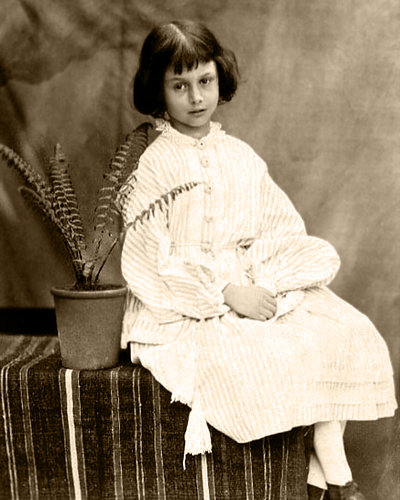
Alice Liddell

- January 8 – James Milton Carroll, American Baptist pastor, leader, historian and author (d. 1931)
- January 11 – Constantin Fehrenbach, Chancellor of Germany (d. 1926)
- January 18 – Augustin Boué de Lapeyrère, French admiral (d. 1924)
- January 20 – José Guadalupe Posada, Mexican political engraver and printmaker (d. 1913)
- January 26 – Pierre Savorgnan de Brazza, Italian-born explorer of Africa (d. 1905)
- February 5 – Terauchi Masatake, 9th Prime Minister of Japan (d. 1919)
- February 16 – Charles Taze Russell (Pastor Russell), American Protestant reformer, evangelist, forerunner of Jehovah's Witnesses (d. 1916)
- February 26 – John Harvey Kellogg, American Adventist doctor and health reformer (d. 1943)
- March 1 – Théophile Delcassé, French statesman (d. 1923)

=== April–June ===
- April 1 – Edwin Austin Abbey, American painter (d. 1911)
- April 3 – Talbot Baines Reed, English author (d. 1893)
- April 13 – Frank Winfield Woolworth, American merchant, businessman (d. 1919)
- April 22 – William IV, Grand Duke of Luxembourg (d. 1912)
- May 1
  - Santiago Ramón y Cajal, Spanish histologist, recipient of the Nobel Prize in Physiology or Medicine (d. 1934)
  - Martha "Calamity" Jane Canary, American frontierswoman (d. 1903)
- May 2 – Max von Gallwitz, German general (d. 1937)
- May 4 – Alice Pleasance Liddell, inspiration for the English children's classic Alice's Adventures in Wonderland by Lewis Carroll (d. 1934)
- May 13 – Dashi-Dorzho Itigilov, Buryat Buddhist leader (d. 1927)
- May 14
  - Émile Fayolle, French general (d. 1928)
  - Alton B. Parker, American judge, Democratic political candidate (d. 1926)
- May 22 – Moritz von Auffenberg, Austro-Hungarian general and politician (d. 1928)
- May 31
  - Aleksei Aleksandrovich Bobrinsky, Soviet historian and politician (d. 1927)
  - Julius Richard Petri, German bacteriologist (d. 1921)
- June 13 – Anna Whitlock, Swedish women's rights activist (d. 1930)
- June 24 – Victor Adler, Austrian politician (d. 1918)
- June 25
  - Antoni Gaudí, Spanish modernist architect (d. 1926)
  - Friedrich Loeffler, German bacteriologist (d. 1915)
- June 30 – Karl Petrovich Jessen, Russian admiral (d. 1918)

=== July–September ===
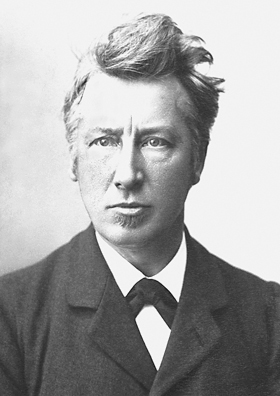
Jacobus Henricus van 't Hoff

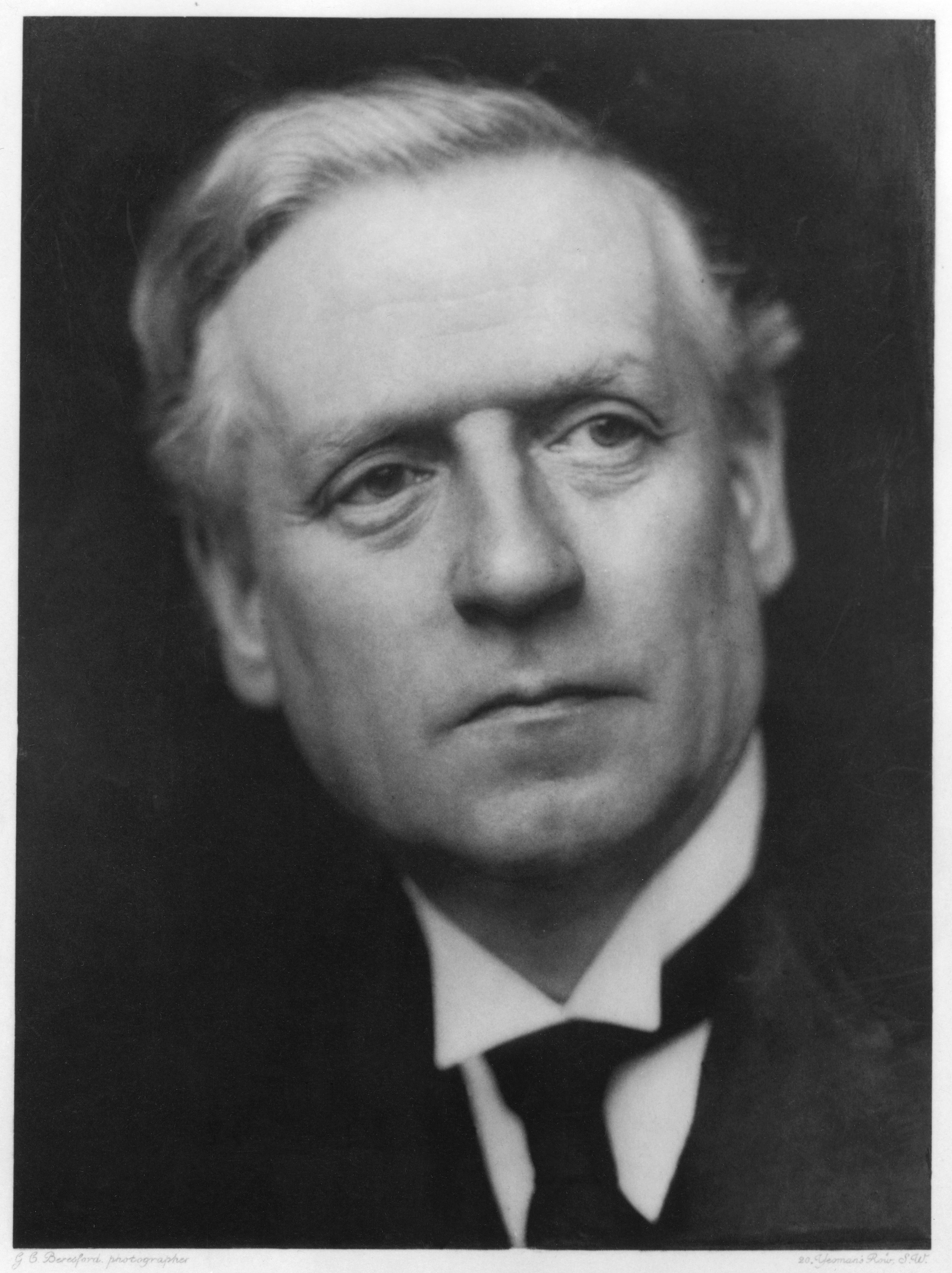
H. H. Asquith

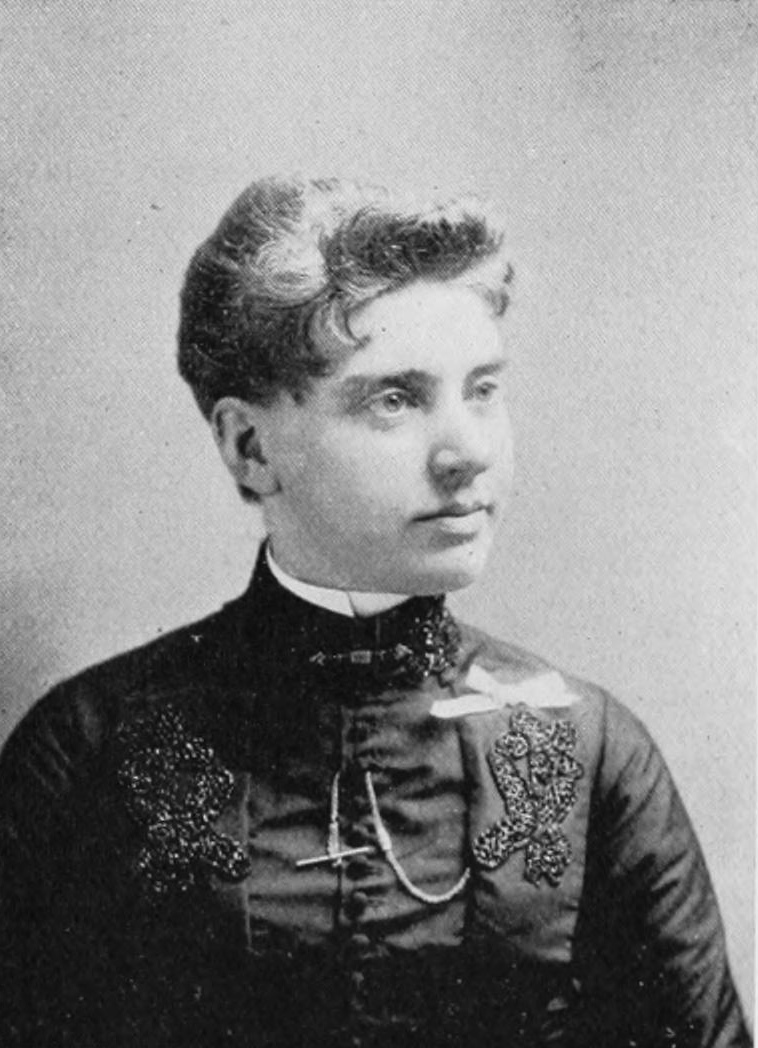
Eva Kinney Griffith

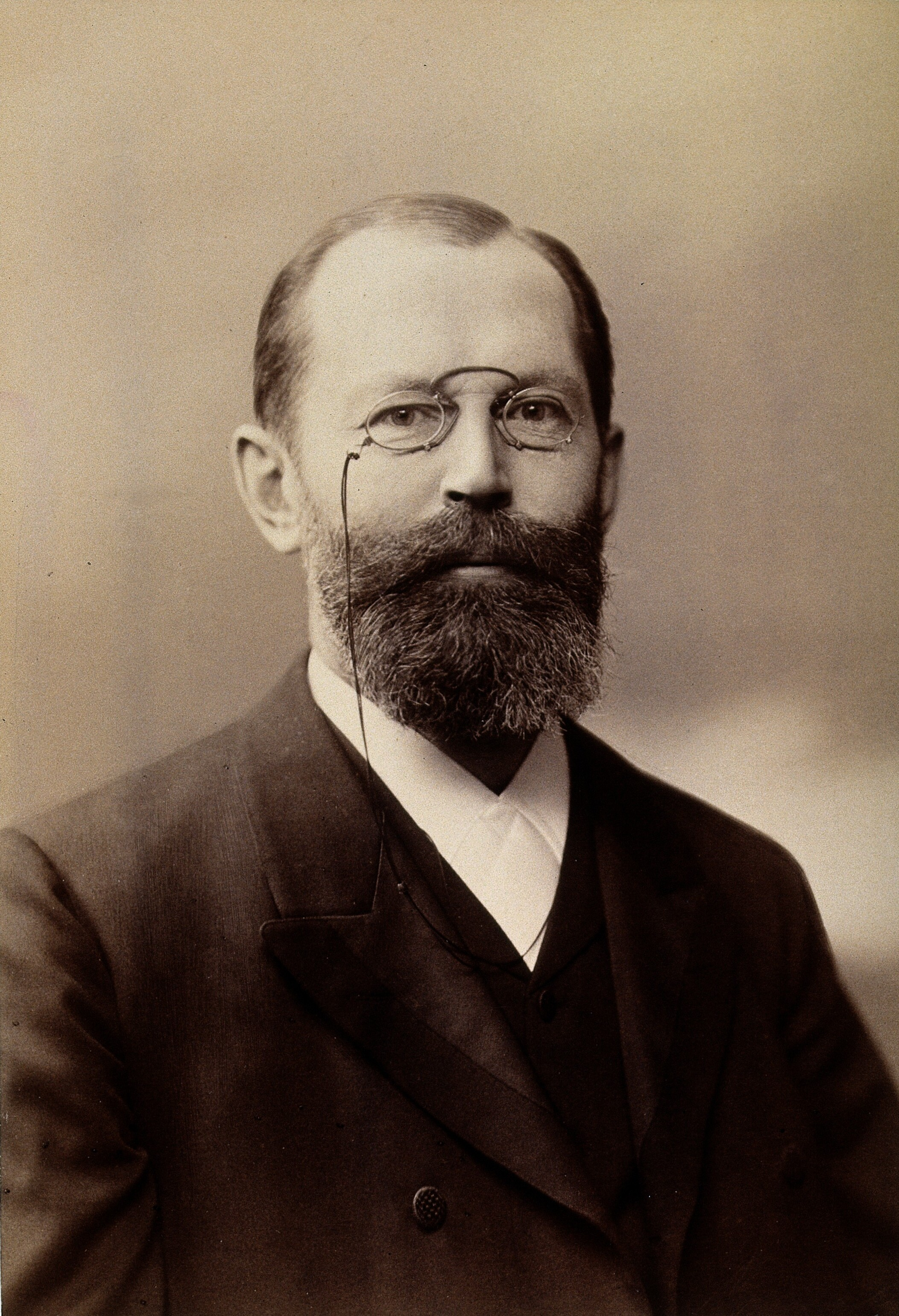
Hermann Emil Fischer

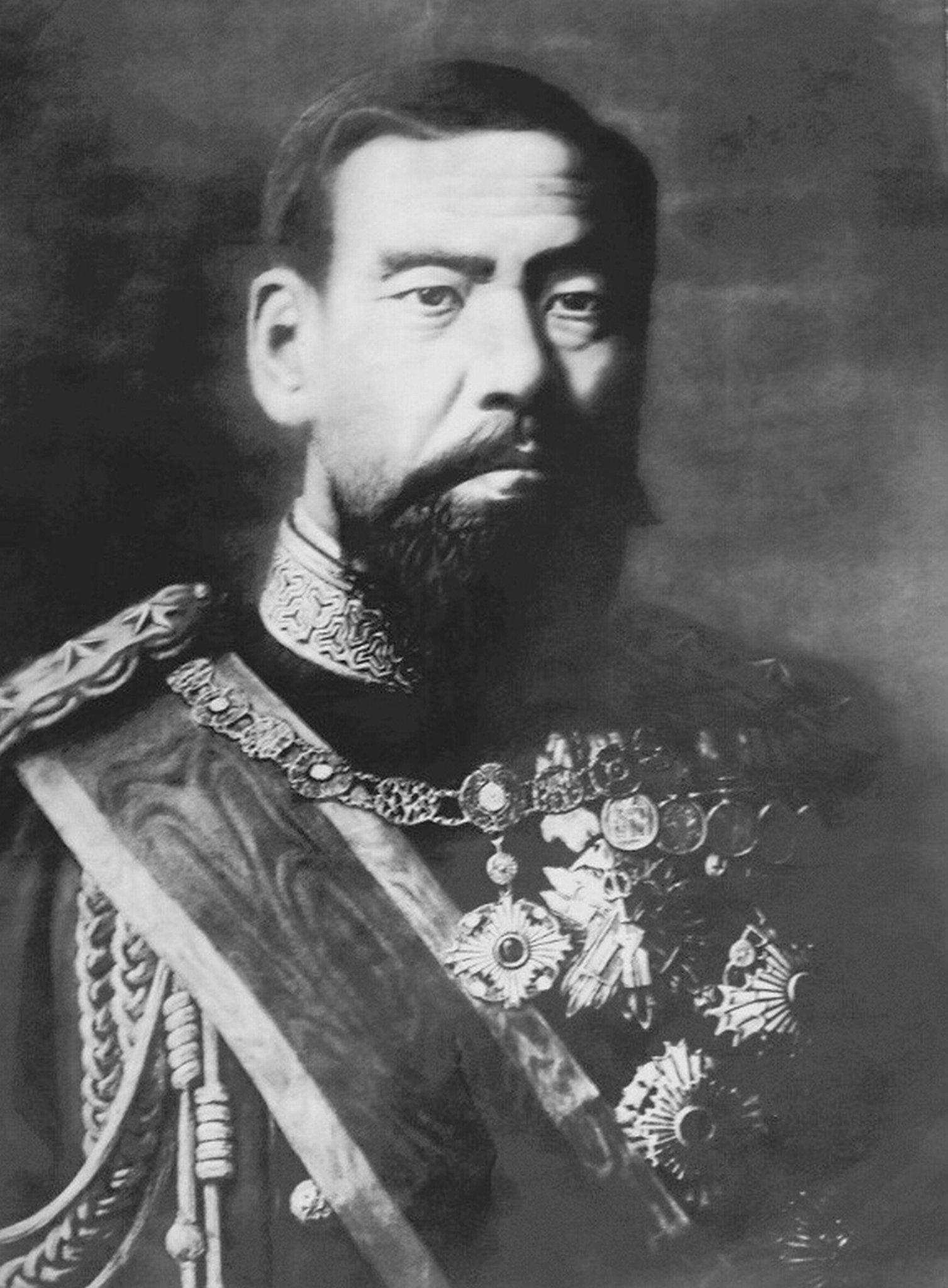
Emperor Meiji

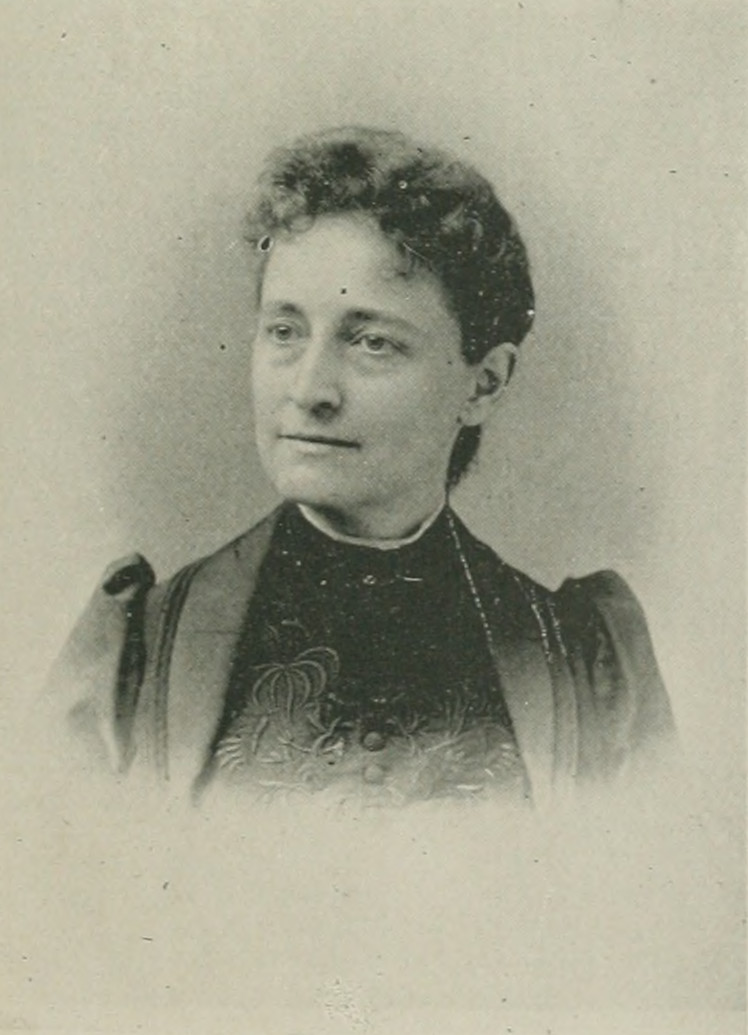
Ella Maria Ballou

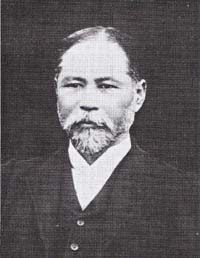
Yamamoto Gonnohyōe

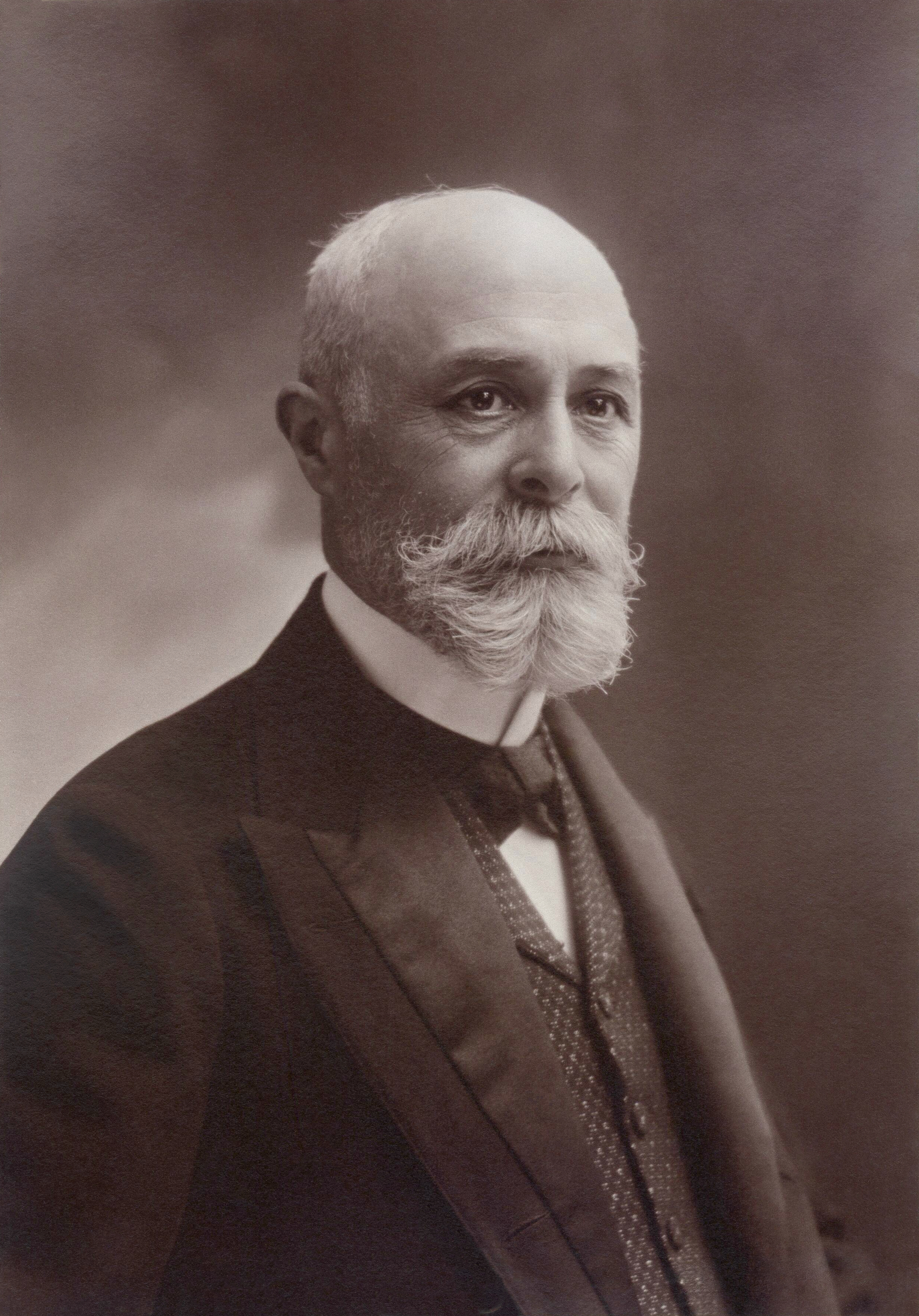
Henri Becquerel

- July 9 – Grigore C. Crăiniceanu, Romanian general and politician (d. 1935)
- July 12 – Hipólito Yrigoyen, 18th President of Argentina (d. 1933)
- July 15 – Josef Josephi, Polish-born singer and actor (d. 1920)
- July 20
  - Theo Heemskerk, Prime Minister of the Netherlands (d. 1932)
  - Maria Brace Kimball, American elocutionist (d. 1933)
- July 31 – Charles Lanrezac, French general (d. 1925)
- August 4
  - Catharine van Tussenbroek, Dutch physician (d. 1925)
  - Charles Coborn, British singer (d. 1945)
- August 12 – Blessed Michael J. McGivney, American priest and founder of the Knights of Columbus (d. 1890).
- August 23 – Clímaco Calderón, 15th President of Colombia (d. 1913)
- August 30 – Jacobus Henricus van 't Hoff, Dutch chemist, Nobel Prize laureate (d. 1911)
- September 6 – Schalk Willem Burger, Boer military leader, lawyer, politician, and statesman, acting President of the South African Republic (1900–1902) (d. 1918)
- September 8 – Gojong, 26th king of the Korean Joseon dynasty, first emperor of Korea (d. 1919)
- September 10 – Hans Niels Andersen, Danish businessman, founder of the East Asiatic Company (d. 1937)
- September 12 – H. H. Asquith, Prime Minister of the United Kingdom (d. 1928)
- September 28
  - John French, 1st Earl of Ypres, British field marshal, commander of the British Expeditionary Force in World War I (d. 1925)
  - Henri Moissan, French chemist, Nobel Prize laureate (d. 1907)
- September 29 – Ijuin Gorō, Japanese admiral (d. 1921)
- September 30 – Charles Villiers Stanford, Irish composer, resident in England (d. 1924)

=== October–December ===
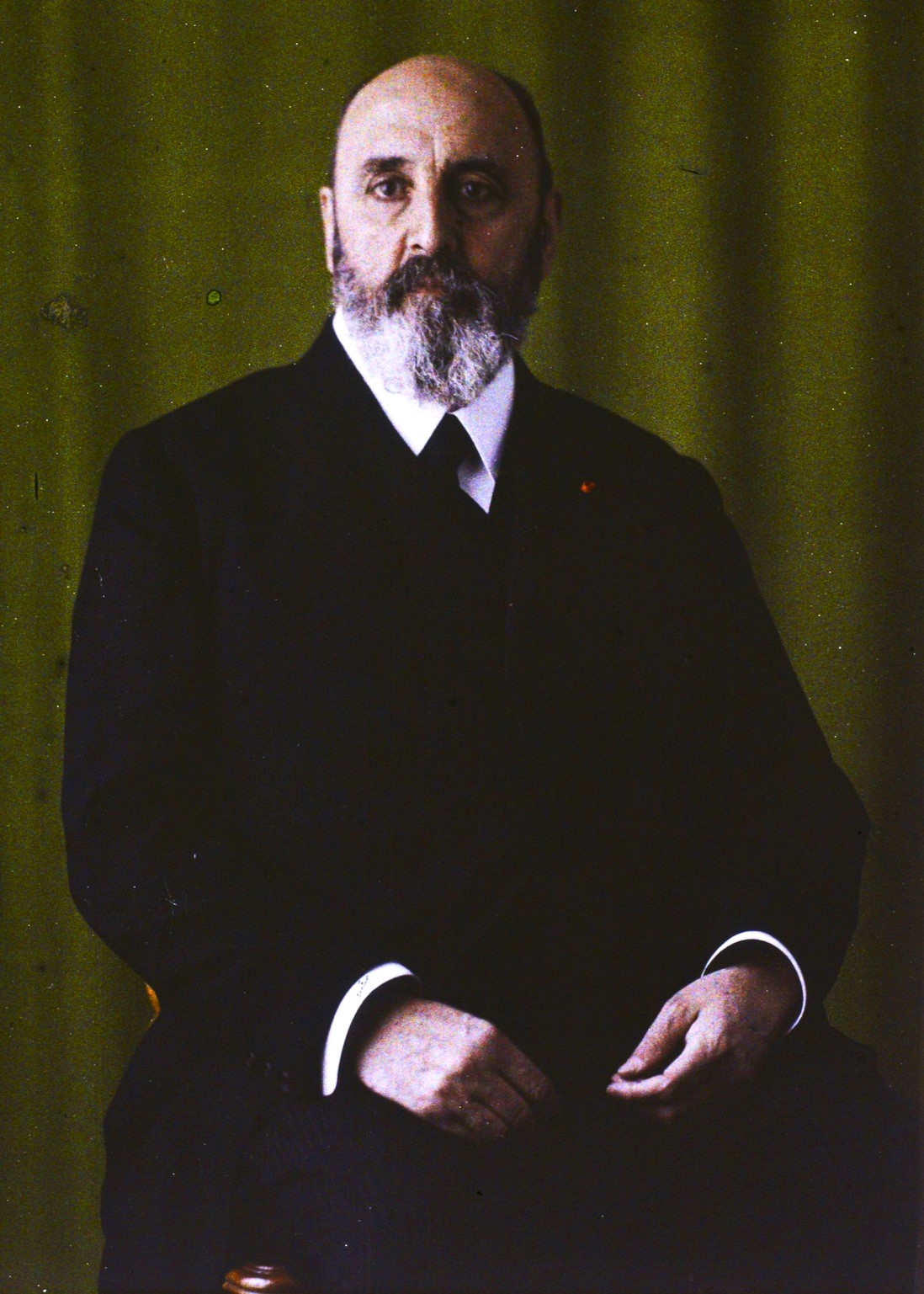
Leonardo Torres Quevedo

- October 2 – William Ramsay, Scottish chemist, Nobel Prize laureate (d. 1916)
- October 9 – Emil Fischer, German chemist, Nobel Prize laureate (d. 1919)
- October 11 – Mary Isabella Macleod, North American pioneer (d. 1933)
- October 16 – Carl von In der Maur, Governor of Liechtenstein (d. 1913)
- October 17 – George Egerton, British admiral (d. 1940)
- November 1 – Eugene W. Chafin, American politician (d. 1920)
- November 3 – Emperor Meiji of Japan (d. 1912)
- November 6 – Béni Grosschmid, Hungarian jurist and civil law scholar (d. 1938)
- November 7 – Johan Ramstedt, 9th Prime Minister of Sweden (d. 1935)
- November 8 – Eva Kinney Griffith, American activist and writer (d. 1918)
- November 11 – Franz Conrad von Hötzendorf, Austro-Hungarian field marshal (d. 1925)
- November 15 – Ella Maria Ballou, American writer (d. 1937)
- November 22 – Paul Henri Balluet d'Estournelles de Constant, French diplomat, recipient of the Nobel Peace Prize (d. 1924)
- November 26 – Yamamoto Gonnohyōe, 16th and 22nd Prime Minister of Japan, admiral in the Imperial Japanese Navy (d. 1933)
- December 10 – Felix Graf von Bothmer, German general (d. 1937)
- December 15
  - Henri Becquerel, French physicist, Nobel Prize laureate (d. 1908)
  - Reginald F. Nicholson, United States Navy admiral (d. 1939)
- December 19 – Albert A. Michelson, German-born physicist, Nobel Prize laureate (d. 1931)
- December 21 – George Callaghan, British admiral (d. 1920)
- December 28 – Leonardo Torres Quevedo, Spanish engineer, one of pioneers of computing and the radio control, inventor of El Ajedrecista (The Chess Player) (d. 1936)

=== Date unknown ===
- Emma Eliza Bower, American physician, club-woman, and newspaperwoman (d. 1937)
- Liu Buchan, Chinese admiral (d. 1895)
- Gef, supposed Indian-born Manx talking mongoose (presumed hoax of 1930s)

== Deaths ==
=== January–June ===
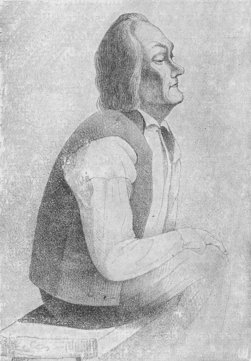
Paavo Ruotsalainen

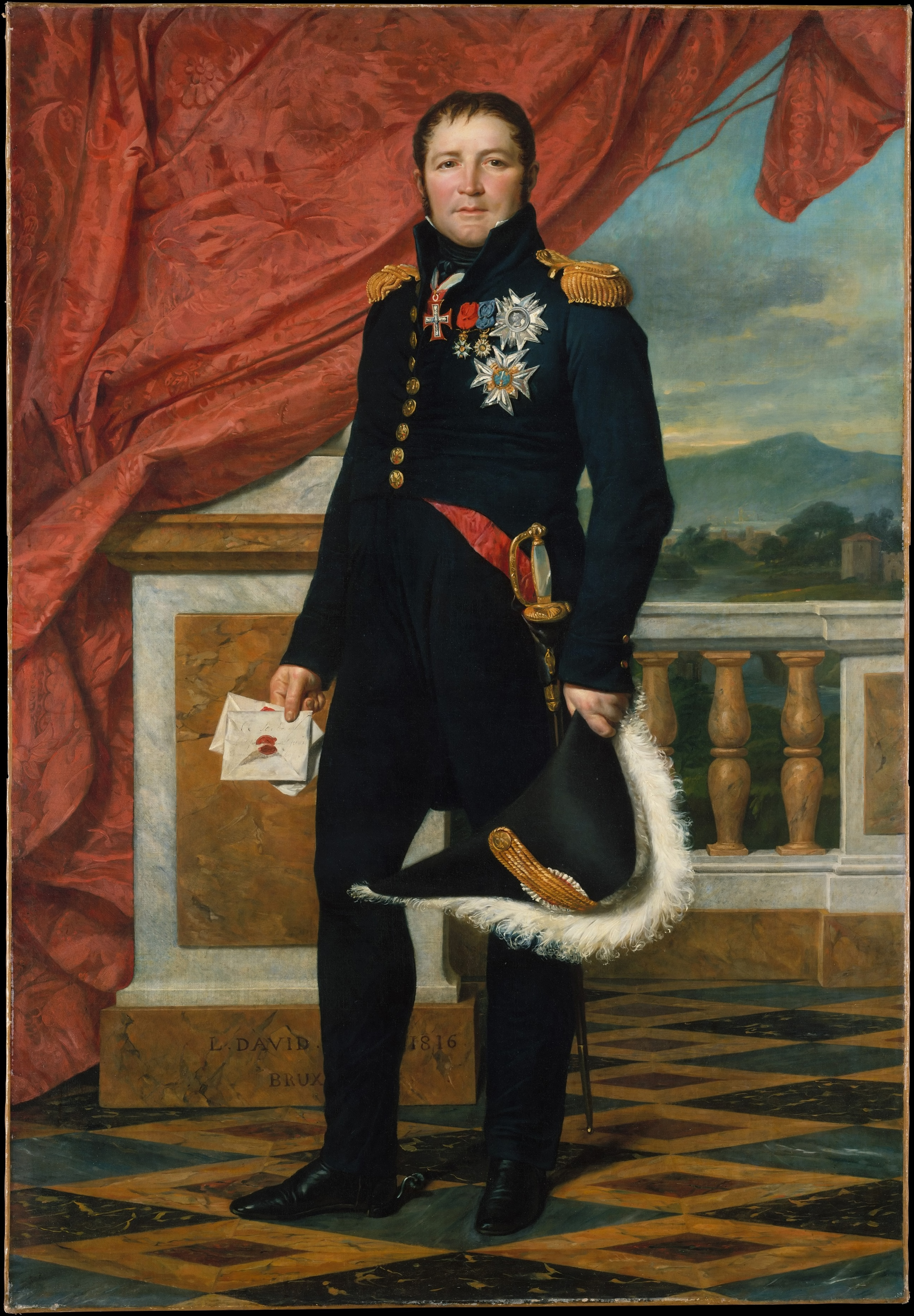
Étienne Maurice Gérard

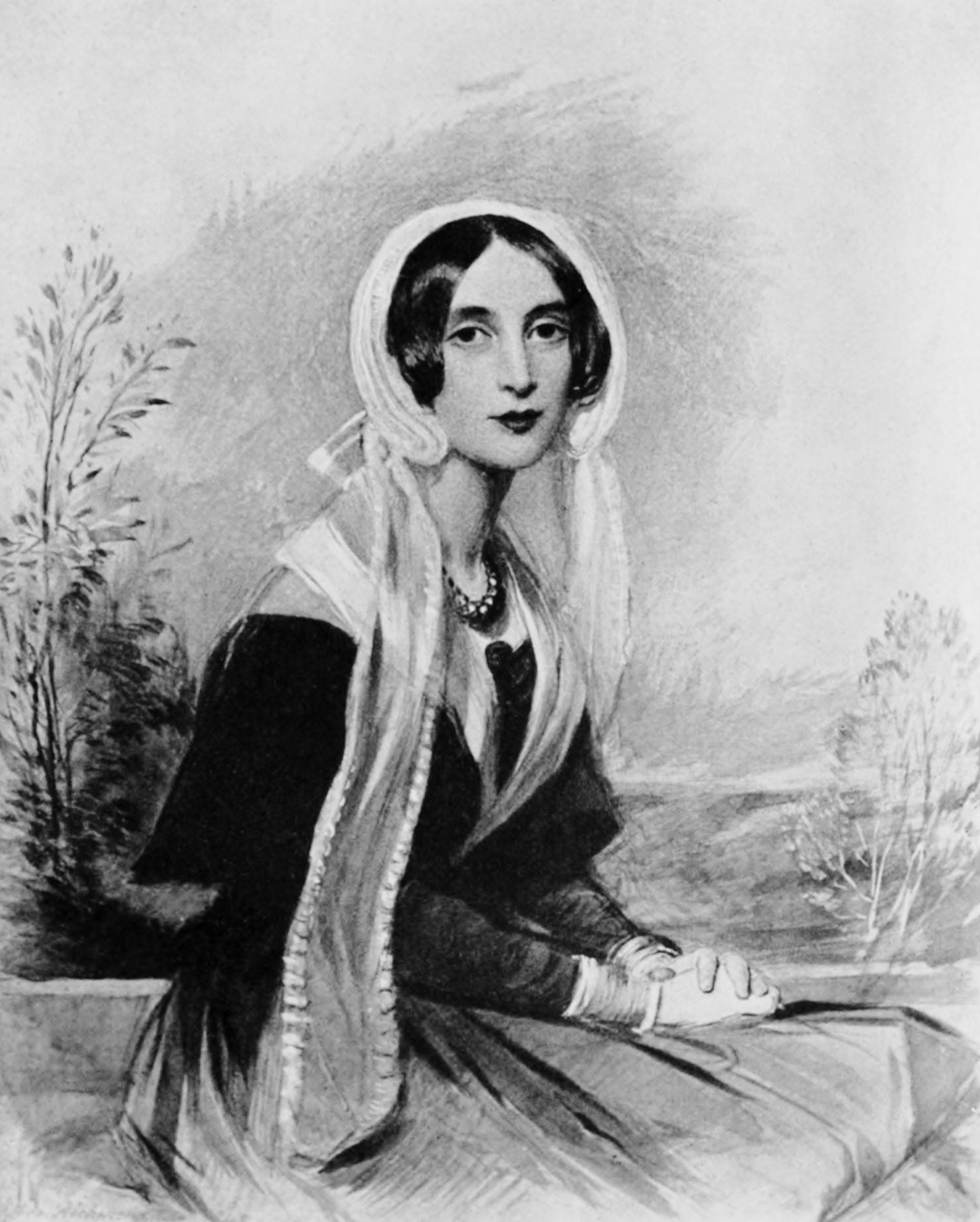
Sara Coleridge

- January 1 – John George Children, British chemist, mineralogist and zoologist (b. 1777)
- January 6 – Louis Braille, French teacher of the blind, inventor of braille (b. 1809)
- January 27 – Paavo Ruotsalainen, Finnish farmer and lay preacher (b. 1777)
- February 10 – Samuel Prout, English watercolour painter (b. 1783)
- March 4 – Nikolai Gogol, Russian writer (b. 1809)
- March 22 – Auguste de Marmont, French general, nobleman and marshal (b. 1774)
- April 17 – Étienne Maurice Gérard, French general, statesman and marshal, 11th Prime Minister of France (b. 1773)
- May 3 – Sara Coleridge, British author and translator (b. 1802)
- May 15 – Louisa Adams, First Lady of the United States (b. 1775)
- June 7 – José Joaquín Estudillo, second Mexican alcalde of Yerba Buena (b. 1800)
- June 21 – Friedrich Fröbel, German pedagogue (b. 1782)
- June 29 – Henry Clay, American statesman (b. 1777)

=== July–December ===
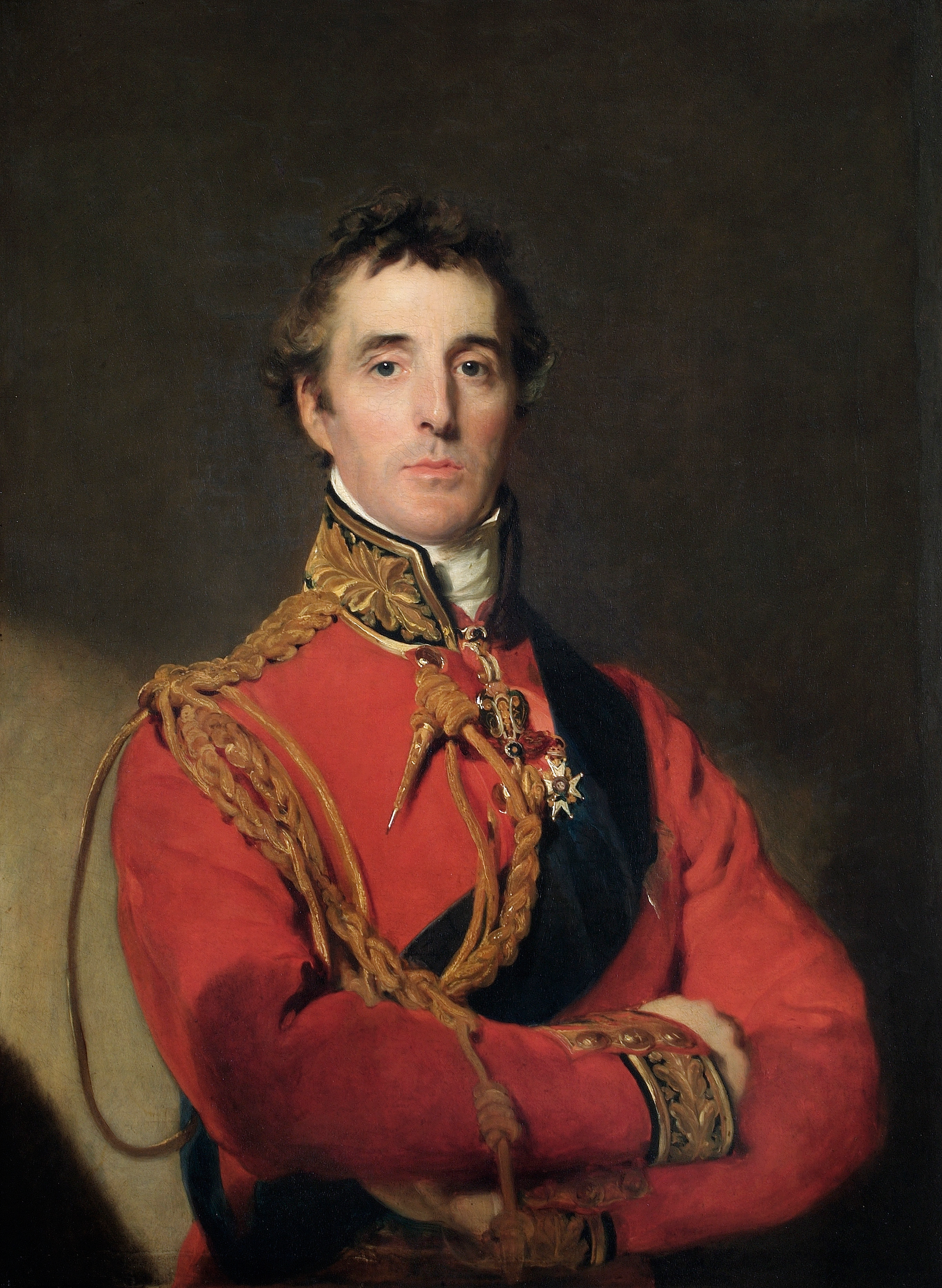
Arthur Wellesley, 1st Duke of Wellington

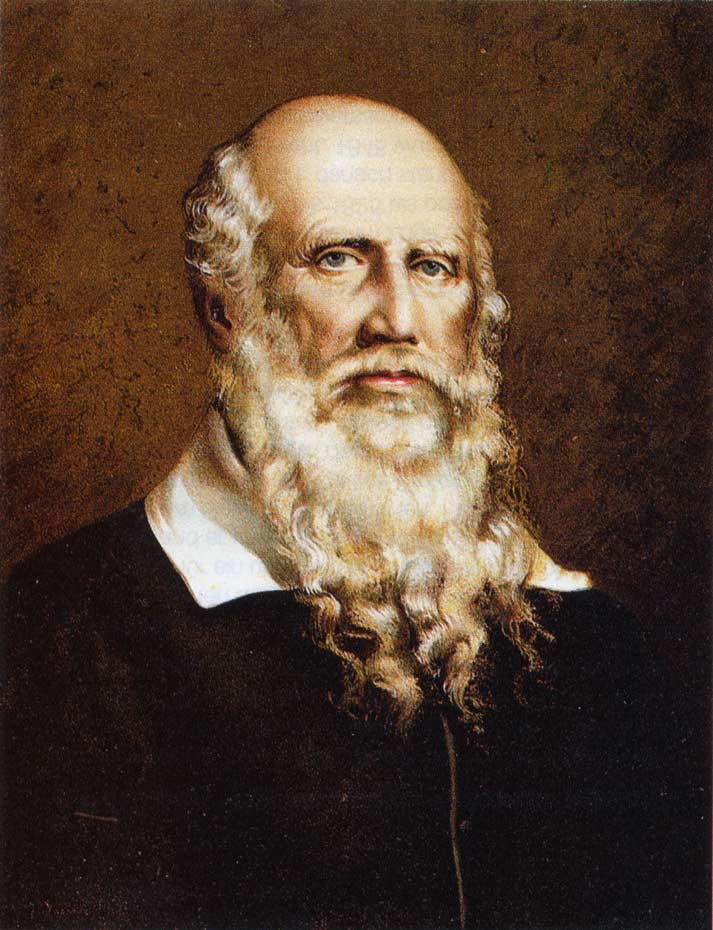
Friedrich Ludwig Jahn

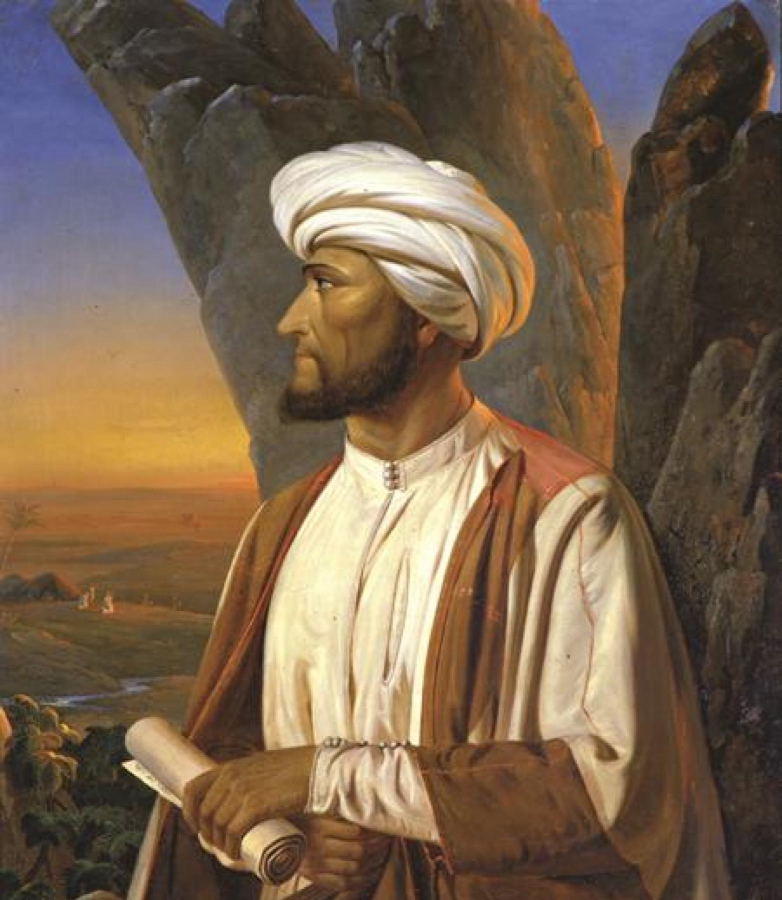
Georg August Wallin

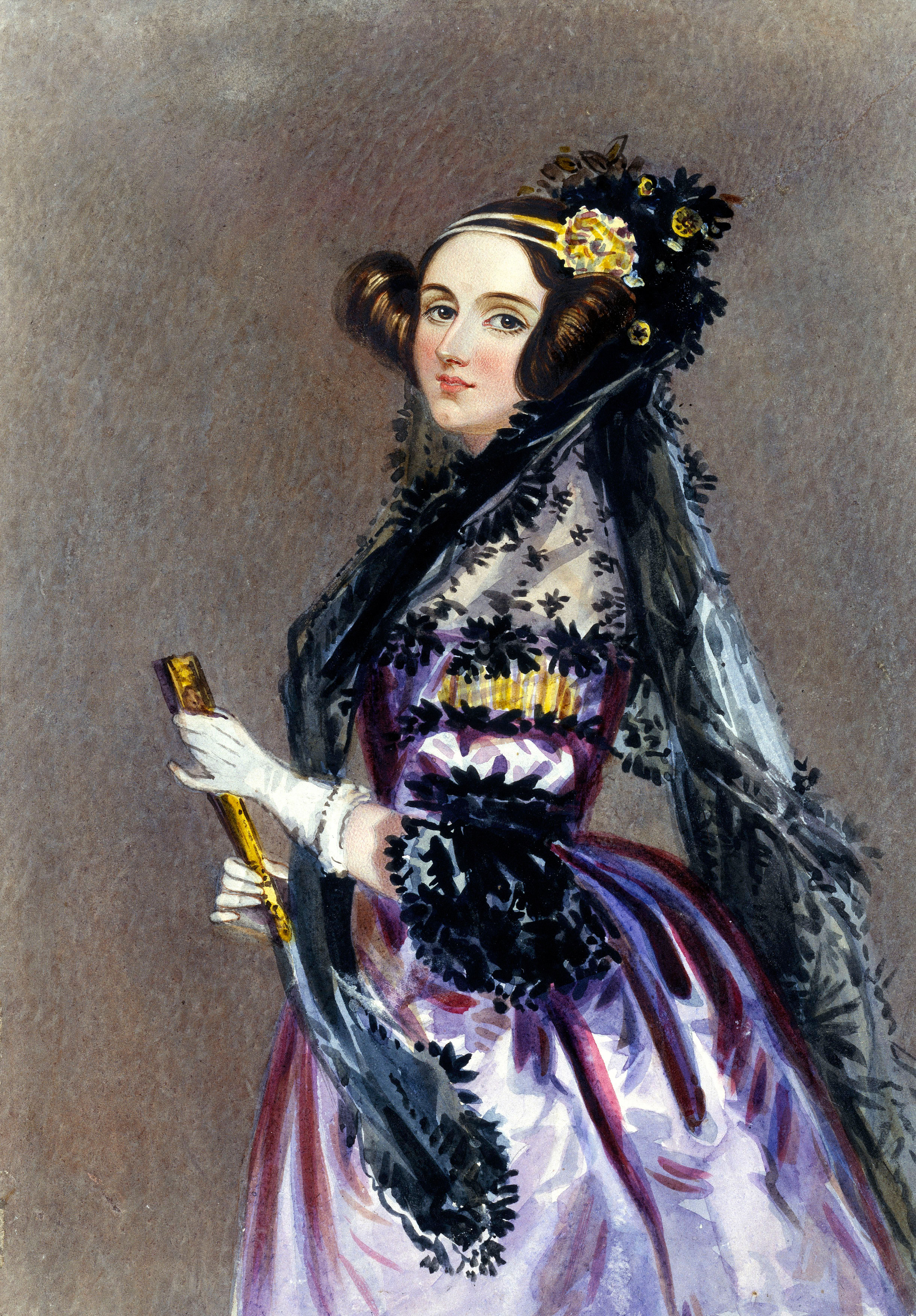
Ada Lovelace

- July 20 – José Antonio Estudillo, early California settler (b. 1805)
- August – Táhirih, Iranian Baha'i theologian, poet and feminist (b. 1814)
- August 14 – Margaret Taylor, First Lady of the United States (b. 1788)
- August 24 – Sarah Guppy, English inventor (b. 1770)
- September 4 – William MacGillivray, Scottish naturalist and ornithologist (b. 1796)
- September 8 – Anna Maria Walker, Scottish botanist (b. 1778)
- September 14
  - Augustus Pugin, English architect (b. 1812)
  - Arthur Wellesley, 1st Duke of Wellington, British general and political figure, twice Prime Minister of the United Kingdom (b. 1769)
- September 20 – Philander Chase, American founder of Kenyon College (b. 1775)
- October 7 – Sir Edward Troubridge, 2nd Baronet, British admiral (b. ca. 1787)
- October 13 – John Lloyd Stephens, American traveler, diplomat and Mayanist archaeologist (b. 1805)
- October 15 – Friedrich Ludwig Jahn, German gymnastics educator (b. 1778)
- October 23 – Georg August Wallin, Finnish orientalist, explorer and professor (b. 1811)
- October 24 – Daniel Webster, American statesman (b. 1782)
- October 25 – John C. Clark, American politician (b. 1793)
- October 26 – Vincenzo Gioberti, Italian philosopher (b. 1801)
- November 2 – Pyotr Kotlyarevsky, Russian military hero (b. 1782)
- November 10 – Gideon Mantell, English geologist, palaeontologist (b. 1790)
- November 17 – Adolph Carl August von Eschenmayer, German philosopher (b. 1768)
- November 18 – John Andrew Shulze, American politician (b. 1775)
- November 27 – Augusta Ada King (née Byron), Countess of Lovelace, early English computer pioneer (b. 1815)
- November 29 – Nicolae Bălcescu, Wallachian revolutionary (b. 1819)
- November 30 – Junius Brutus Booth, English-born stage actor, father of Edwin Booth and John Wilkes Booth (b. 1796)
- December 16 – Andries Hendrik Potgieter, Voortrekker leader (b. 1792)
- date unknown – Joanna Żubr, Polish soldier (b. 1770)
- Maktoum bin Butye, Chief of Dubai
