= 1852 in literature =

This article contains information about the literary events and publications of 1852.

== Events ==
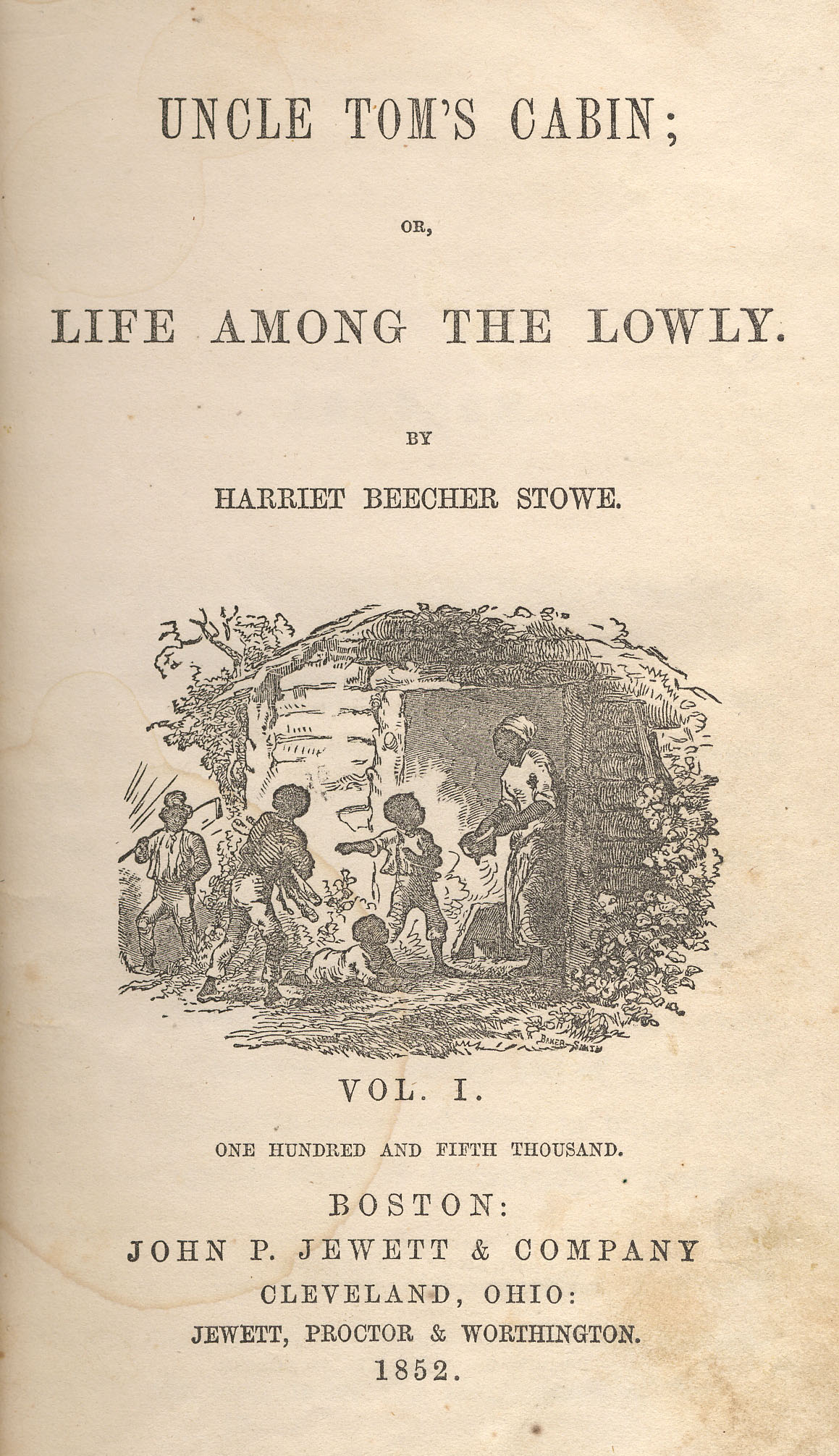

- February 2 – Alexandre Dumas, fils's stage adaptation of his 1848 novel La Dame aux caméllias is premièred at the Théâtre du Vaudeville in Paris. Eugénie Doche created the role of Marguerite Gautier, opposite Charles Fechter as Armand Duval. Doche reportedly played the role of Marguerite for 617 times before her eventual death in 1900.
- February 24 – Nikolai Gogol burns some of his manuscripts, including most of the second part of Dead Souls, telling acquaintances the action is a practical joke played on him by the Devil. He takes to his bed and dies a few days later. Gogol was mourned in the Saint Tatiana church at the Moscow University before his burial and then buried at the Danilov Monastery, close to his fellow Slavophile Aleksey Khomyakov. His grave was marked by a large stone (Golgotha), topped by a Russian Orthodox cross.
- March – Serialization of Charles Dickens' novel Bleak House begins; the September installment introduces the first detective in an English novel.
- March 8 – Nathaniel Hawthorne purchases The Wayside in Concord, Massachusetts from Bronson Alcott.
- March 20 – Harriet Beecher Stowe's abolitionist novel Uncle Tom's Cabin; or, Life Among the Lowly is first published in book form, by John P. Jewett of Boston with illustrations by Hammatt Billings, rapidly establishing its position as the best-selling novel of the 19th century. The first British publication (by Samuel Orchart Beeton) is in April followed by C. H. Clarke and Co.'s in May and John Cassell's serial issue with illustrations by George Cruikshank, together with pirated reprints from Routledge. The first dramatic adaptations appear on the New York stage from Autumn. This year also, Jewett publishes the first work of fiction in English by an African American, the escaped slave Frederick Douglass's novella The Heroic Slave, a heartwarming Narrative of the Adventures of Madison Washington, in Pursuit of Liberty.
- April – Samuel Orchart Beeton launches The Englishwoman's Domestic Magazine, the first British magazine aimed at a middle-class female readership.
- April 16 – Ivan Turgenev is imprisoned and exiled to his country estate over an obituary praising Gogol.
- April 24 – Wilkie Collins' first contribution to Household Words, "The traveller's story of a terribly strange bed", is an early example of crime fiction involving the (Paris) police.
- April 29 – Roget's Thesaurus, created by retired British physician Peter Mark Roget, is first published as Thesaurus of English Words and Phrases Classified and Arranged so as to Facilitate the Expression of Ideas and Assist in Literary Composition in London.
- August – Ivan Turgenev's A Sportsman's Sketches («Записки охотника», Zapiski ohotnika; also known as Sketches from a Hunter's Album) are published in book form in Russia while the author is in internal exile; the work is subsequently banned in the Russian Empire. The first major writing to gain him international recognition and influential in the Russian tradition of literary realism, the stories are notable for their sympathy for the privations of serfdom in Russia in the prelude to the emancipation reform of 1861.
- August 5 – Exiled French novelist Victor Hugo moves to Saint Helier on Jersey in the Channel Islands with his mistress Juliette Drouet.
- September 2 – The public library in Campfield, Manchester, England, is the first to offer free lending under the U.K. Public Libraries Act 1850; Edward Bulwer-Lytton and Charles Dickens are present at the opening ceremony.
- November
  - Leo Tolstoy's debut novel, Childhood («Детство», Detstvo), is published under the initials L. N. in this month's issue of the Saint Petersburg literary journal Sovremennik.
  - The Merchant of Venice becomes the first of Shakespeare's plays to be performed publicly in India in an Indian language, Gujarati, as Nathari Firangiz Thekani Avi presented by a Parsi company at Surat.
- November 23 – At the suggestion of English novelist Anthony Trollope, at this time an official of the British General Post Office, the first roadside pillar boxes in the British Isles are brought into public use in Saint Helier on Jersey in the Channel Islands.
- unknown dates
  - Pierre Larousse and Augustin Boyer found a publishing house in Paris.
  - Hanah Mullens' Karuna O Phulmonir Bibaran is the first Bengali novel. The first publication of Bengali plays also takes place this year: C. C. Gupta's Kirtivilas and Taracharan Sikdar's Bhadrarjun.
  - The first translation of a substantial literary work into the Māori language, Defoe's Robinson Crusoe as Ropitini Koruhu, translated by government official Henry T. Kemp, is published in Wellington, New Zealand, "under the direction of the Government".
- probable – The first printing press in the Faeroe Islands is established.

== New books ==
=== Fiction ===
- Manuel Antônio de Almeida – Memoirs of a Police Sergeant
- Caroline Chesebro' – Isa, a Pilgrimage
- Wilkie Collins – Basil: A Story of Modern Life
- Robert Criswell – "Uncle Tom's Cabin" Contrasted with Buckingham Hall, the Planter's Home
- Alphonse de Lamartine – Graziella
- Mary H. Eastman – Aunt Phillis's Cabin
- Baynard Rush Hall – Frank Freeman's Barber Shop
- Nathaniel Hawthorne
  - The Blithedale Romance
  - The Snow-Image, and Other Twice-Told Tales
- Caroline Lee Hentz
  - Eoline
  - Marcus Warland
- Herman Melville – Pierre: or, The Ambiguities
- Charles Jacobs Peterson (as J. Thornton Randolph) – The Cabin and Parlor; or, Slaves and Masters
- George W. M. Reynolds – Mary Price
- Caroline Rush – The North and the South; or, Slavery and Its Contrasts
- William L. G. Smith – Life at the South; or, "Uncle Tom's Cabin" As It Is
- Harriet Beecher Stowe – Uncle Tom's Cabin
- William Makepeace Thackeray
  - The History of Henry Esmond
  - Men's Wives
- Leo Tolstoy – Childhood
- Catharine Parr Traill – Canadian Crusoes
- Ivan Turgenev – A Sportsman's Sketches
- Frances Milton Trollope – Uncle Walter
- Susan Bogert Warner – Queechy
- Walt Whitman (anonymous) – Life and Adventures of Jack Engle (published serially)

=== Children ===
- Ellen Henrietta Ranyard – The Book and its Story

=== Drama ===
- Dion Boucicault – The Corsican Brothers
- Manuel Bretón de los Herreros – La escuela del matrimonio
- Alexandre Dumas, fils – La Dame aux Caméllias
- Gustav Freytag – Die Journalisten
- Christian Friedrich Hebbel – Agnes Bernauer
- George William Lovell – The Trial of Love
- John Westland Marston – Anne Blake
- Tom Taylor and Charles Reade – Masks and Faces

=== Poetry ===
- Théophile Gautier – Emaux et camées

=== Non-fiction ===
- Juan Bautista Alberdi – Bases y puntos de partida para la organización política de la República Argentina (Bases and points of departure for Argentine political organization)
- William Wells Brown – Three Years in Europe
- Kuno Fischer – System der Logik und Metaphysik oder Wissenschaftslehre (System of logic and metaphysics, or doctrine of knowledge)
- Edward A. Freeman – The Preservation and Restoration of Ancient Monuments
- Victor Hugo – Napoléon le Petit
- Karl Marx – The Eighteenth Brumaire of Louis Napoleon (Der 18te Brumaire des Louis Napoleon)
- Susanna Moodie – Roughing It in The Bush: or, Forest Life in Canada
- Laurence Oliphant – A Journey to Katmandu (the Capital of Nepaul), with the camp of Jung Bahadoor
- Dr. Peter Mark Roget – Roget's Thesaurus (1st edition)
- Leopold von Ranke – Französische Geschichte, vornehmlich im sechzehnten und siebzehnten Jahrhundert (History of France, Principally in the Sixteenth and Seventeenth Centuries; publication begins)

== Births ==
- February 24 – George Moore, Irish novelist, memoirist and dramatist (died 1933)
- March 15 – Augusta, Lady Gregory, Irish dramatist and folklorist (died 1932)
- March 17 – Cora Linn Daniels, American author (died 1934)
- April 23 – Edwin Markham, American poet (died 1940)
- May 4 – Alice Pleasance Liddell, inspiration for the English children's classic Alice's Adventures in Wonderland by Lewis Carroll (died 1934)
- June 4 – Lucas Malet (Mary St Leger Kingsley), English novelist (died 1931)
- September 2 – Paul Bourget, French novelist, poet and critic (died 1935)
- October 11 – Cynthia Morgan St. John, American Wordsworthian, book collector, and author (died 1919)
- October 31 – Mary Eleanor Wilkins Freeman, American short-story and children's writer (died 1930)
- November 8
  - Eva Kinney Griffith, American journalist, temperance activist, novelist, newspaper editor, and journal publisher (died 1918)
  - Lin Shu (林紓), Chinese translator (died 1924)
- November 15 — Ella Maria Ballou, American writer (d. 1937)

== Deaths ==
- February 17 – Micah Joseph Lebensohn, Lithuanian poet writing in Hebrew (born 1828)
- February 25 – Thomas Moore, Irish poet (born 1779)
- March 4 – Nikolai Gogol, Russian dramatist, novelist and short story writer (born 1809)
- March 25 – Jane West (Prudentia Homespun), English novelist and writer of conduct books (born 1758)
- April 25 – Álvares de Azevedo, Brazilian Ultra-Romantic writer (born 1831) (tuberculosis)
- May 3
  - Sara Coleridge, British author and translator (born 1802)
  - Amelia B. Coppuck Welby, American fugitive poet (born 1819)
- May 12 – John Richardson, Canadian novelist (starvation, born 1796)
- May 25 – Charlotta Berger, Swedish poet and novelist (born 1784)
- September 11 – Margaret Holford the Younger, English poet and novelist (born 1778)
- September 30 – Mary Matilda Betham, English diarist, scholar and poet (born 1776)
- October 26 – Vincenzo Gioberti, Italian philosopher (apoplexy, born 1801)
- November 28 – Ludger Duvernay, French Canadian journalist and publisher (born 1799)
- December 16 – Samuel Lee, English orientalist and linguist (born 1783)
