= Joanna Żubr =

Polish soldier (1772 or 1782–1852)

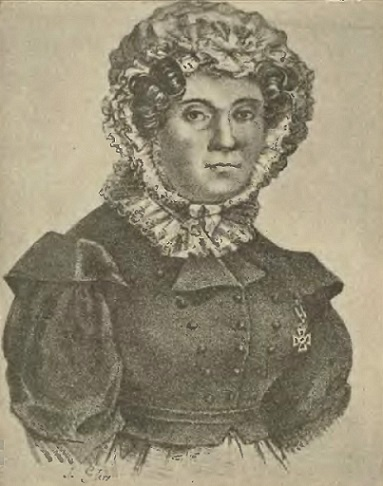
- Born: 1772 or 1782; Berdyczów, Crown of the Kingdom of Poland, Polish–Lithuanian Commonwealth (now Berdychiv, Ukraine)
- Died: 9 July 1852 (aged 79–80 or 69–70) Wieluń, Congress Poland, Russian Empire (now Poland)
- Allegiance: Duchy of Warsaw
- Branch: Army of the Duchy of Warsaw
- Service years: 1808–1814
- Conflicts: Napoleonic Wars; French invasion of Russia
- Awards: Virtuti Militari

Joanna Żubr (1772 or 1782 – 9 July 1852) was a Polish soldier of the Napoleonic Wars, a veteran of the Polish–Austrian War, and the first woman to receive the Virtuti Militari, the highest Polish military decoration.

After the outbreak of the Napoleonic Wars and creation of the Duchy of Warsaw in 1808, Joanna Żubr with her husband, Michał, left Austrian-ruled Volhynia. Both joined the army of the new Duchy, with Joanna initially a camp-follower. Soon she enlisted in the 2nd Infantry Regiment (4th company, 2nd battalion) as a private, hiding that she was a woman from both her superiors and fellow soldiers.

In 1809, Joanna took part in the Galician Campaign, distinguishing herself in the Battle of Zamość on 19 May that year. For her bravery, Prince Józef Poniatowski awarded her the medal of Virtuti Militari; Joanna was the first female soldier to be awarded the decoration and one of the first women in the world to receive a military award for bravery in battle.

After the campaign, she joined the 17th Infantry Regiment in Dąbrowski's Division, under Jan Henryk Dąbrowski. Her husband was an ensign in the same regiment and Joanna Żubr was promoted to sergeant, as the first woman in the Polish Army. Their division, renamed the Greater Polish Division, took part in Napoleon's invasion of Russia and his campaign in present-day Belarus.

During the battles and Napoleon's retreat, she was separated from her division, but she managed to escape from Russia on her own. In the summer of 1813, weeks after Prince Józef Poniatowski's forces had abandoned Kraków, she reached Polish units in Saxony and served with distinction until the signing of the Treaty of Fontainebleau and the end of the war.

Joanna and her husband returned to Poland. Because she could return to neither Austrian-occupied nor Russian-held parts of Poland, they settled at Wieluń. She died there during a cholera epidemic in 1852, at the age of about eighty.

== Sources ==
- Encyklopedia Wojen Napoleońskich – R. Bielecki ("Encyclopedia of the Napoleonic Wars" in Polish)
- List of recipients of the Order Virtuti Militari
