= The Cabin and Parlor; or, Slaves and Masters =

1852 book by Charles Jacobs Peterson

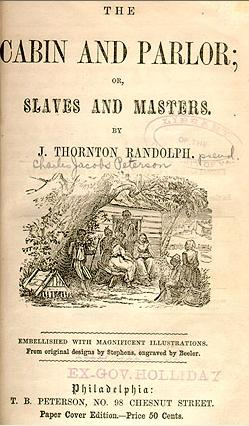
- Title page from the first edition of 1852
- Author: J. Thornton Randolph (pseudonym of Charles Jacobs Peterson)
- Language: English
- Genre: Plantation novel
- Publisher: T. B. Peterson Ltd.
- Publication date: 1852
- Publication place: United States
- Media type: Print (Hardcover & Paperback) & E-book
- Pages: c. 300 pp (May change depending on the publisher and the size of the text)

The Cabin and Parlor; or, Slaves and Masters is an 1852 novel by Charles Jacobs Peterson, writing under the pseudonym J. Thornton Randolph.

== Overview ==
The Cabin and Parlor is an example of the pro-slavery plantation literature genre that emerged from the Southern United States in response to the abolitionist novel Uncle Tom's Cabin by Harriet Beecher Stowe, which had been published in book form in that year, and criticised in the Southern United States for exaggerating the workings of slaveholding.

Whereas the majority of anti-Tom novels focused on the evils of abolitionism, Peterson instead attacked the North's capitalist attitudes, and their use of "white slaves" (the working classes) over black slaves. This attitude appeared again in Caroline Rush's The North and the South; or, Slavery and Its Contrasts, also published in 1852.

== Plot summary ==
The story begins with the sudden death of Mr. Courtenay, a wealthy but kindly Virginia landowner who, not having had time to pay off his debts, leaves his family facing destitution.

In an effort to avoid bankruptcy, the family sells their slaves, among whom is the kindly Uncle Peter, who takes a liking to Courtenay's daughter, Isabel, and vows to help the family in any way he can in thanks for the kindness they showed him. The money from the sales is nominal, and Isabel and her brother Horace must find jobs to pay the remaining bills and support their ailing mother.

Isabel finds work as a schoolteacher, and Horace heads to an unidentified city in the North (implied as Philadelphia), where he becomes a "Northern slave" (i.e. clerk) to the malevolent Mr. Sharpe, a ruthless capitalist who works Horace mercilessly.

As the Courtenays continue to struggle, Isabel finds comfort in a young slaveowner named Walworth, the son of an old Virginia family, who travels back and forth between the North and South. When Horace dies of exhaustion in the North, Walworth comforts him in his final hours, and delivers his final requests to his sister.

Whilst travelling together, Walworth and Isabel are caught in the midst of an anti-black riot, from which Walworth saves Isabel from harm. Isabel begins to have romantic feelings for Walworth, and they eventually marry. The marriage, by a twist of fate, allows Isabel to reclaim her wealth and property—including her slaves—and she is finally reinstated at Courtenay Hall.

== Characters ==
- Isabel Courtenay, the novel's heroine, one of Courtenay's two children, who struggles to pay her father's debts following his death
- Horace Courtenay, Mr. Courtenay's son and Isabel's brother, who travels north to acquire a job, and eventually dies there after being exhausted by his overbearing employers
- Walworth, a young English American slaveowner, whose family has deep roots in Virginia and who, along with Uncle Peter, helps the Courtenays regain their wealth and property
- Uncle Peter, a kindly slave once owned by the Courtenays, who wishes to help his former masters during their difficult time in return for their kindness to him
- Mr. Sharpe, a malevolent, bullying capitalist (possibly intended to correspond with the character of Simon Legree in Uncle Tom's Cabin) who employs Horace, treats him with contempt, and literally works him to death
- Mr. Courtenay, the resident of Courtenay Hall in Virginia, who dies suddenly at the beginning of the novel, leaving his family in debt

== Publication history ==
Peterson's novel was among the earliest examples of the plantation literature genre, released six months after Uncle Tom's Cabin appeared in book form.

The publishers of Peterson's novel, T.B. Peterson Ltd. (Theophilus B. Peterson was Charles' brother) subsequently published other "anti-Tom" novels, most notably The Planter's Northern Bride (1854) by Caroline Lee Hentz.
