= Manuel Antônio de Almeida =

Brazilian novelist, physician, teacher and literary critic

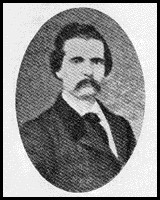
- A photograph of Almeida
- Born: 17 November 1831; Rio de Janeiro City, Rio de Janeiro, Empire of Brazil
- Died: 28 November 1861 (aged 30); Near Macaé, Rio de Janeiro, Empire of Brazil
- Occupations: novelist, medician, teacher, literary critic
- Writing career
- Pen name: Um Brasileiro
- Notable work: Memoirs of a Police Sergeant
- Literary movement: Romanticism

Manuel Antônio de Almeida (November 17, 1831 – November 28, 1861) was a Brazilian satirical writer, medician and teacher. He is famous for the book Memoirs of a Police Sergeant, written under the pen name Um Brasileiro (English: A Brazilian). He is the patron of the 28th chair of the Brazilian Academy of Letters.

== Biography ==
Almeida was born in Rio de Janeiro, to lieutenant Antônio de Almeida and Josefina Maria de Almeida. Few things are known about his years of primary studies — although he entered at the Medicine course in 1849, graduating in 1855. Financial difficulties inspired him to dedicate himself to literature and journalism. His magnum opus, Memoirs of a Police Sergeant (or, in Portuguese, Memórias de um Sargento de Milícias), was initially published in feuilleton form during the years 1852-1853, in the journal Correio Mercantil.

In 1858, he became the administrator of Tipografia Nacional, where he met Machado de Assis. Trying to enter in the political career, he would go to the city of Campos dos Goytacazes, embarking in the ship Hermes, in order to start his political research. However, the ship wrecked off near the shores of Macaé, and he died in the disaster.

== Works ==
- Memoirs of a Police Sergeant (1852)
- Dois Amores (theater play — 1861)

Preceded by New creation	Brazilian Academy of Letters - Patron of the 28th chair	Succeeded by Inglês de Sousa (founder)
