= The North and the South; or, Slavery and Its Contrasts =

1852 novel by Caroline Rush

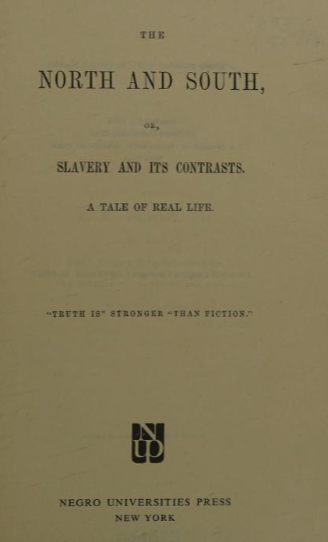
- 1968 reprint
- Author: Caroline Rush
- Language: English
- Genre: Plantation literature
- Publisher: Crissy & Markley
- Publication date: 1852
- Publication place: United States
- Media type: Print

The North and the South; or, Slavery and Its Contrasts is an 1852 plantation fiction novel by Caroline Rush, and among the first examples of the genre, alongside others such as Aunt Phillis's Cabin by Mary Henderson Eastman and Life at the South; or, "Uncle Tom's Cabin" As It Is by W.L.G. Smith, both of which were also released in 1852.

== Overview ==
The North and the South was one of several examples of the pro-slavery plantation literature genre that emerged from the Southern United States in response to Uncle Tom's Cabin by Harriet Beecher Stowe, which was criticised in the South as inaccurately depicting the workings of slavery and the attitudes of plantation owners towards their slaves.

Rush's novel departs from this aspect, instead claiming that the sympathies expressed for slaves in the South is better directed at the "white slaves of poverty" (i.e. the working classes) of the North. A similar angle had been taken (albeit with less fervour) in the earlier anti-Tom novel The Cabin and Parlor; or, Slaves and Masters by Charles Jacobs Peterson.

This change in attitude would put The North and the South on a similar line to the works of Charles Dickens in England, particularly his 1838 work Nicholas Nickleby (which featured a similar storyline), and the 1844 novel Martin Chuzzlewit, which also featured criticisms of class society in the United States.

== Plot ==
The story centres on the wealthy and prosperous Harley family, consisting of: Frank (the father), Gazella (the mother), and their nine children. After a series of bad investments results in bankruptcy, the Harleys are forced into destitution, which in turn leads to Frank's untimely death from excessive drinking.

Gazella continues life as a seamstress in order to provide for her children, two of which have since left home to live on a plantation in Mississippi and are now regaining their wealth. As a working-class woman, Gazella suffers all forms of abuse from those who had once been her equals. The North wanted the slaves to be free and equal. The South wanted slavery for the need in money for crops.

== Publication history ==
The North and South was first published in its entirety in hardback by Crissy & Markley in 1852.
