= Memoirs of a Police Sergeant =

1852 satirical novel by Manuel Antônio de Almeida

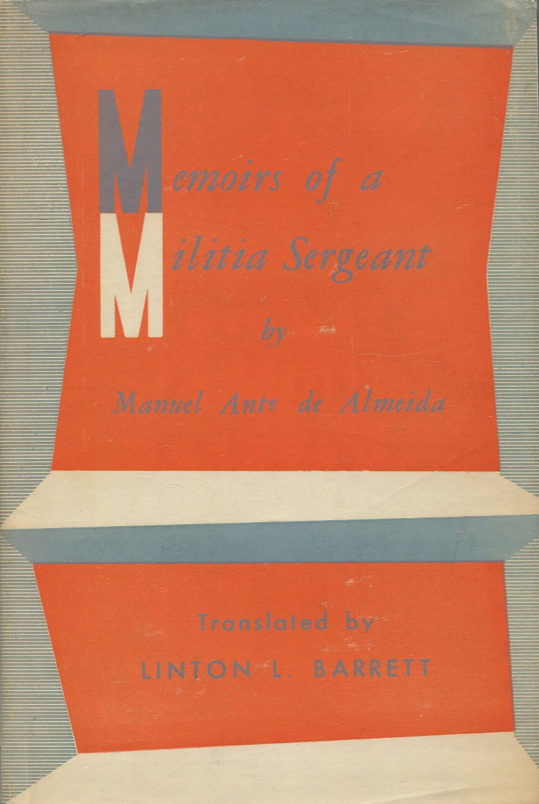
- 1959 edition of Memoirs of a Police Sergeant
- Author: Manuel Antônio de Almeida
- Original title: Memórias de um sargento de milícias
- Language: Portuguese
- Genre: Satire
- Set in: Rio de Janeiro, Brazil
- Publication date: 1852
- Publication place: Brazil
- Original text: Memórias de um sargento de milícias at Portuguese Wikisource

Memoirs of a Police Sergeant (Portuguese: Memórias de um sargento de milícias) is a satirical novel written by the Brazilian author Manuel Antônio de Almeida. It was first published in 1852.

The book is full of picturesque descriptions of Rio de Janeiro's life in the early 19th century, including popular feasts and holidays. The book is considered to be an outstanding work in the Brazilian Literature, because of its almost grotesque humor against some Brazilian institutions, like the Army, the Church and is considered, besides a literary masterpiece, an important source of Brazilian history.

== Plot ==
The novel is set at around 1808 (since the first line is something like "It was in the Time of the King") and it tells the colourful story of a problem child (Leonardo), from when his parents first meet, until his childhood, in a hypocritical and corrupt society. Leonardo grows up into an amoral, reckless young man until he is arrested by the police and given the chance of becoming a police officer instead of serving his sentence.

== Editions ==
An edition in Portuguese (New York, NY: Luso-Brazilian Books, 2005) has the ISBN 0-85051-504-1.

An English edition titled Memoirs of a militia sergeant: a novel (New York: Oxford University Press, 1999) has the ISBN 0-19-511549-X.
