= Siege of Zamość =

1656 siege

Coordinates: 50.72314°N 23.25196°E

- Part of the Deluge
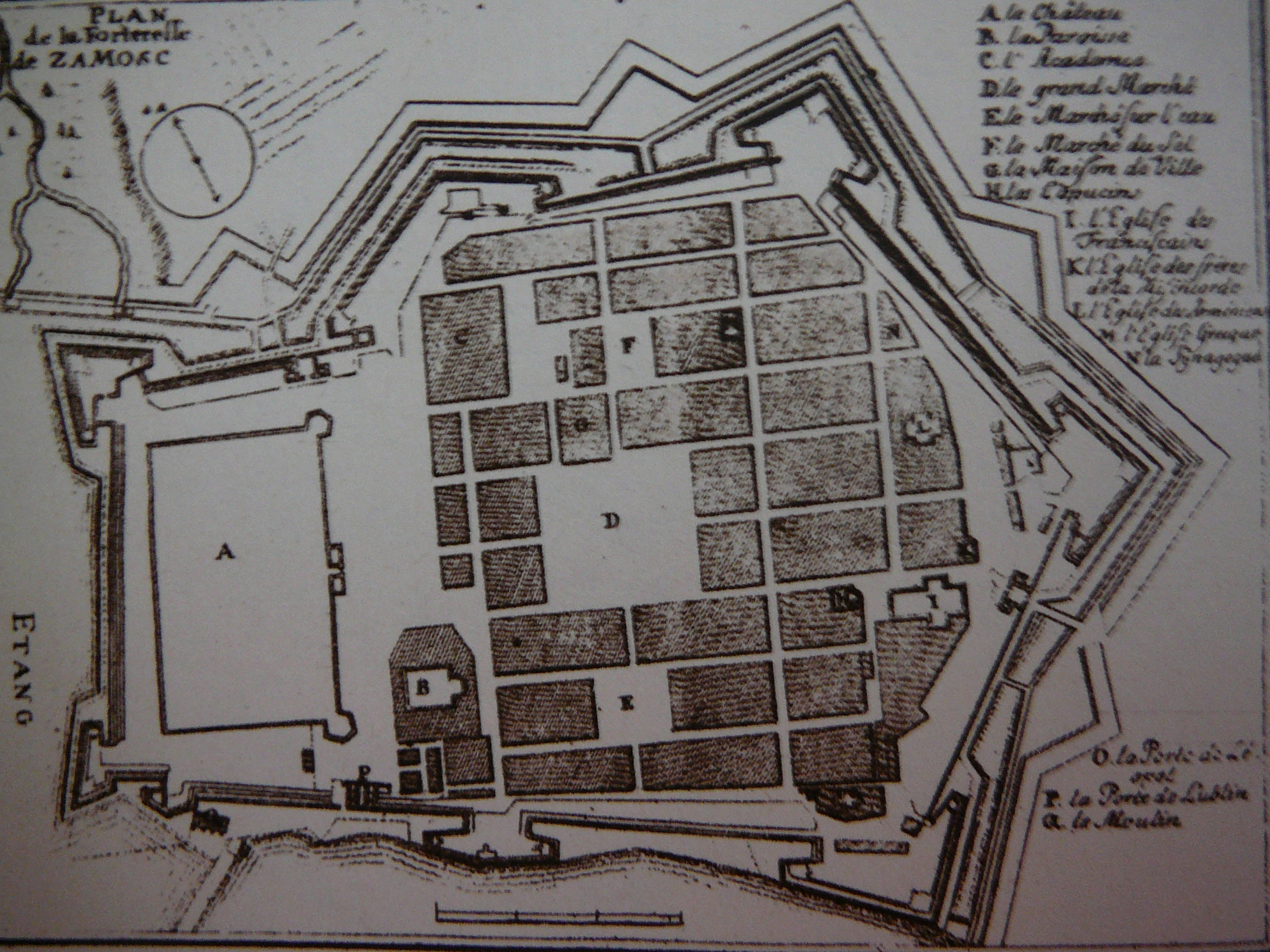
- Map of Zamosc Fortress from the mid-17th Century
Date	February 25 – March 1, 1656
Location	Zamość, Poland
Result	Polish–Lithuanian victory
Territorial changes	Swedish retreat

Belligerents
Swedish Empire	Polish–Lithuanian Commonwealth

Commanders and leaders
(Swedish Empire) Robert Douglas	(Polish–Lithuanian Commonwealth) Jan Sobiepan Zamoyski

Casualties and losses
Light	Light

Siege of Zamość was part of The Deluge, a series of campaigns in the Polish–Lithuanian Commonwealth, that took place in early 1656.

== Background ==
In the summer of 1655, the joint Russo-Cossack army approached the fortress, but did not try to capture it. During the Deluge in 1655, when the rest of Poland quickly surrendered to Charles X Gustav of Sweden, Lord of Zamość, Jan II Zamoyski, decided to support King John II Casimir of Poland.

== Siege ==
On February 25, 1656, Swedish troops appeared at the gates of the stronghold. According to a legend, when Swedish representatives came to the town and proposed the capitulation of the fortress, Jan 'Sobiepan' Zamoyski answered: "I am the Lord for myself and I will not give Zamość to the Swedes".

The Swedes began with an artillery barrage, but due to lack of heavy guns, it was not successful. Within a few days, Charles X Gustav realized that capturing Zamość, whose fortifications had been strengthened since 1648, was impossible, and on March 1, the Swedes withdrew.

== Aftermath ==
Next year, the Transylvanian army under George II Rákóczi appeared near Zamość, but it did not even try to capture the mighty fortress.

In the last stage of the war, Zamość was a prison for high-ranking officers of the Swedish Army. Among those kept there, was Field Marshal Arvid Wittenberg, who died in prison of natural causes.

== In popular culture ==
The Swedish siege of Zamość was described by Henryk Sienkiewicz, in his popular book The Deluge (1886).
