= Caroline Chesebro' =

American author

- Born: Caroline Chesebrough; March 30, 1825; Canandaigua, New York, U.S.
- Died: February 16, 1873 (aged 47); Piermont, New York, U.S.
- Occupation: writer
- Writing career
- Language: English
- Genres: short stories; juvenile literature; novels

Caroline Chesebro' (March 30, 1825 – February 16, 1873) was a 19th-century American writer of fiction, including short stories, juvenile literature, and novels. Born "Caroline Chesebrough", but known by her preferred spelling of "Caroline Chesebro'", she was the founder of The Packard Quarterly.

Chesebro first became known as a writer in 1848, when she was engaged as a contributor to Graham's American Monthly Magazine. Subsequently, she was connected as a sketch writer with many prominent monthly magazines and other periodicals. In 1851, she published a volume of short stories under the collective head of Dreamland by Daylight, a Panorama of Romance, and a year later, she wrote her debut novel, Isa, a Pilgrimage, followed by another novel, Victoria, or the World Overcome, in 1856. Chesebro' also wrote The Beautiful Gate, and Other Tales, and was an occasional contributor to some of the daily newspapers. In later years, her short stories were attractive to the readers of Harper's Magazine and The Atlantic monthlies and Appletons' Journal. Writing for two decades, her publications steadily gaining favor with the public, improvement being perceptible in the later volumes.

== Early life and education ==
Caroline Chesebrough was born at Canandaigua, New York, March 30, 1825. Her parents were Betsey Kimball and Nicoholas Goddard Chesebrough, hatter and postmaster. She had four older siblings and three that were younger. Her ancestors, Anne Stevenson and William Chesebrough, removed from England to the Massachusetts Bay Colony (1630), and were associated with the establishment of Braintree, Massachusetts, Rehoboth, Massachusetts, and Stonington, Connecticut.

Chesebro was educated at a female seminary in her local town.

== Career ==
Chesebro remained in Canandaigua until 1835, when she was invited to a position in the Packer Collegiate Institute, Brooklyn. She had the charge of Composition in the higher departments of the institute, but lived with her brothers and sister at Piermont, New York on the Hudson River.

For many years, Chesebro' contributed prose and verse to periodicals. Between 1848 and 1851, her stories appeared in Graham's American Monthly Magazine, Holden's Dollar Magazine, The Knickerbocker, Sartain's, Peterson's Magazine, and Godey's Lady's Book. Twenty-four of her stories appeared in Dream-Land by Daylight, A Panorama of Romance (1851, J.S. Redfield). From 1851, her stories were published in Harper's Magazine, as well as Appleton's, Beadle's, Continental, Galaxy, Lippincott's, and Putnam's, as well as, beginning in 1857, The Atlantic Monthly.

Chesebro' wrote several books, among which are: Dream of Land by Day Light; Peter Carvadine; Isa, a Pilgrimage; The Children of Light; Getting Along; Victoria; and The Foe in the Household. Puy (1896) described them as, "evincing descriptive and analytical powers of a high order".

== Later years ==
After 1865, Chesebro' returned to teaching at Packer Collegiate Institute. She died at her home near Piermont, 16 February 1873. Her funeral took place at Canandaigus.

== Critical reception ==
On March 11, 1852, Alice Cary, wrote to the Cincinnati Gazette regarding Chesebro's Isa:—

In some of the popular poetry of the day, the poison of infidelity is widely diffused, the author 'for a pretence' making nature his source of inspiration, for in reality he has no inspiration above the love of the sensuous, and no ability save what is mechanical. Amongst our women writers I especially regret to see any of this spirit. Miss Chesebro', a young aspirant for literary honor has in press a new book, in which I am told by one who has seen it, she does battle according to her powers for the dark. I am sorry for this as she has honored me with a part of the dedication, and, I would not willingly be thought to share the sentiment. There is, I think, in the trick of manner, the familiar and common-place way of speaking of sacred things, the classing our Saviour with great and good men, philanthrophists, and the like, a miserable subterfuge for downright skepticism. In this 'bold bad' stle often writes Grace Greenwood, E. Oakes Smith, and some other notable women".

Chesebro responded two months later in the Richmond Weekly Palladium:—

Miss Carey's criticism is public defamation of a work she has not seen; her 'bold' condemnation had for its support the misrepresentation of an informant whose name is withheld; she disclaimed the dedication at a time when it was in her power to retract the gracious permission that her name should be associated in that Dedication, with the name of Grace Greenwood; she brings to bear, by the close association of sentences, the condemnation upon Isa, that it is a corrupt and atheistic book, that it is a battling according to my power for the dark. I protest against this slanderous and awful charge..."

Ripley's New-York Tribune review of Chesebro's The Foe in the Household is included in Hart's A Manual of American Literature: A Text-book for Schools and Colleges (1873):—

"The essential quality of Miss Chesebro's mind is intuition, rather than imagination; of fancy, she makes little use; her style is that of lucid narration, with the transparency of crystal, and no aim at rhetorical effect; and hence her fictitious writings have the air of a rehearsal of facts, rather than of artistic invention. But her insight into the depths of human emotion is the faculty from which her productions derive their tone. As a general rule, she has no sympathy with the darker passions of our nature; no delight in the delineation of scenes of repulsive wickedness; but she selects her materials from the common heart of every-day humanity. . . . . Hence the singular reality of all her characters, none of whom is without a distinct purpose, or fails in the exhibition of consistency and unity, which, in her writings, produce a more powerful impression than any desire of artificial dramatic skill. The record of their experience, which is less startling than natural, reads more like personal biography than a creation of art, and we become interested in their fortunes as in the adventures of people whom we have known."

== Awards ==
- 1855, Original prize story, entitled Rachel Prince, US$200, awarded by The Weekly Sun

== Selected works ==
- As to Duty
- Captain Ben
- Good-Will's Sexton
- Five-Ten
- Mr. Bronson's Fall Engagements
- Philly and kit
- The Drake Difficulty
- The Feast of the Lord
- The Rivals
- The Scape-Goat
- The warrior and the poet
- Two Lives Discovered
- Victoria : or, the world overcome.
- Dream-land by daylight : a panorama of romance, 1851
- Isa : a pilgrimage, 1852
- The children of light : a theme for the time, 1853
- The little cross-bearers, 1854
- Getting along : a book of illustrations. : "Know thyself." : In two volumes. Vol. I[-II]., 1855
- Susan, the fisherman's daughter, or, Getting along : a book of illustrations, 1855
- The beautiful gate : and other tales, 1855
- Philly and Kit or, Life and raiment, 1856
- Blessings in disguise : or, Pictures of some of Miss Haydon's girls, 1863
- Peter Carradine or, The Martindale pastoral, 1863
- Annointed, 1864., 1864
- The glen cabin, or, Away to the hills., 1865
- The fishermen of Gamp's Island; or Ye are not your own., 1865
- Amy Carr, or, The fortune-teller, 1868
- The foe in the household, 1871
- The missionary's Christmas-box, 1878
- The sparrow's fall, or, Under the willow : and other stories, 1879
- The poacher's sons, 1879
