= Isa, a Pilgrimage =

Isa, a Pilgrimage, published in 1852, was the debut novel of American author Caroline Chesebro'. It is a spiritual romance about a woman named Isa, described through narration of her psychological progress.

== Characters ==
- Weare Dugganne is a divinity student whom Isa adores as the ideal of manhood. His growth is more of the heart.
- Isa Lee had been a workhouse girl, rescued by Weare's mother, and adopted into the family. Her growth is more of the head.
- Alanthus Stuart is an Atheist and a Socialist; but to Isa he is an intellectual deity.

== Plot ==
Isa Lee is a young girl, taken from a poorhouse, and educated by Mrs. Dugganne. As she grows up, she leaves her benefactress, becomes an editor, conquers her love for Weare, Mrs. Dugganne's son, and contracts an alliance, in defiance of society and human and divine law, with Alanthus Stuart. Stuart is a very profound philosopher, who acquires entire control over Isa. Her former lover and Dugganne meet for the first and only time over Isa's death-bed; and she clings to Stuart to the end.

== Themes ==
Progressive views on philosophy and marriage are propounded through the words of Isa and Stuart, whose lives are represented as being in some sense a failure. But Isa and Stuart always get the best of every argument, and they maintain their views to the end.

Isa has a sceptical faith, recognizing the divinity alone of perfected mortality. Careless of and scorning conventionalities, she reasons out her own course of action, and, sincere in her rejection of much that is regarded as holy, would willingly become a martyr to her faith, if thereby the world should read a new gospel. Her sophistry is not of the heart, but of the head. Her convictions -the result of severe study- are unerasable, sufficing for her guidance in life, and enabling her to meet death in calm serenity, without a doubt as to her eternally-continued existence.

== Major themes ==
The pilgrimage of Isa seems designed principally to show the insufficiency of merely inellectual culture. The author attempts to draw in Isa, a woman of powerful mind and earnest labor, but without Christian faith and the trust which was alike her strength and weakness.

At page 165, there is a discussion of love and marriage between Isa and Mrs. Irving, in which Mrs. Irving asks Isa, "What think you of the institution (marriage) as a general thing?" Isa replies, "We are progressive. The institution was well enough for the people of past ages; but its necessity and its power have gone by." In its day, this was considered "progressive" with a vengeance. It did not clearly appear what Isa proposed to substitute in the place of marriage, which, "as a general thing", she considered "unholy". All she says is, that, if the bonds were broken, "the very virtue that inspired the unhappy to free themselves, put into vigorous circulation by such act of voluntary divorcement, would of itself produce a better state of things". In page 242, she talks on the same subject with her philosophical friend, Stuart. They agree that the "ordinance of marriage is child-play", "good enough for people sufficiently weak to acknowledge and abide by", still, what is to take its place is not mentioned.

The author's theological sentiments are decidedly "evangelical", and leaving readers to anticipate nothing less than a terrific storm at the close. Stuart asks Isa if she anticipates annihilation. "As (she replies) there is no annihilation, I have never for a moment imagined that there is. I am going within the veil-you will follow me. I shall wait just beyond the point on which your eyes are fixed now. I will not go further until you join me, Alanthus.' "Isa (says Stuart), I will meet you there. In the daytime and the night, in bitterest need, in loneliness, in desertion, in danger, wherever I go, whatever I Í do, you will be with me! I am above the world!" By connecting it with a dream in another part of the volume, readers are left to believe that the author would have this farewell to be taken as a specimen of the cold comfort which philosophy ministers to its votaries. The metaphysics of the tale account for Isa's serene confidence by attributing it to the influence of Stuart's will; and with this pledge of their eternal doom the Nemesis of orthodoxy would seem to be satisfied.

== Reception ==
According to Hale (1852):—"Since Isa will take nothing on trust, the book contains speculations on the most lofty and abstruse themes: the existence of God, the origin of evil, free will, the miracles, the institution of marriage, and others. In none of these are the views either original or profound. Fifteen pages (45 to 60) are taken up with a discussion between Isa and Dugganne, in which Isa asserts, that, to each of us, the will within us is our only God; that "man's soul is the only relator"; and there are contained in the arguments on both sides some unsuccessful attempts at close and accurate reasoning."

Hale characterizes the style as being, in general, forced and inverted, and the sentences often crude and nearly unintelligible. In page 28, speaking of a drunken husband, it is said with great truth that a man would not endure a drunken wife and then comes the following sentence: "And is a man, and if so, why? any more fit, under such circumstances, pursued by, overcome by such lust, to guide and direct his offspring? -to be called a father- a husband?" Such sentences abound all over the book. For an instance of unfortunate imagery, Hale quotes from page 160, where Isa, speaking of music, says, "I love to hear the human heart breasting the wavers of feeling, and leaping upon the beach of sound, saved, because it can find expression."

The Westminster Review (1852), the editor states there is no creative power discerned in Isa.

New York Daily Tribune (1852): "Miss Chesebro' has conquered a high place in a difficult sphere of literary creation. Without indulging in superfluous comparisons, we tell her that she need not envy the position of any female writer in this country. Her vigorous originality is a pledge of ability for future triumphs. But if she shall leave no other memorial of her gifted nature, it is no mean fame to have been the writer of 'Isa's Pilgrimage.'"

Home Journal (1852): "The character of Isa is unique and extraordinary, requiring a powerful imagination to conceive, and a master-pen to portray. The style is vigorous as well as luxuriant. argumentative as well as imaginative, and carries a wild and weird spell to the heart of the reader."

Albany Daily State Register (1852): "To many the book will be rely a powerfully-wrought fiction, which they will read at a grasp, and fling aside when they have gulped the denouement, as they do the scores of novels which are constantly pouring from the press; but to all who think, as well as read, it will prove something more and better."

The Boston Journal (1852): "The author has drawn a melancholy picture illustrative of the fallibility of human judgment, and her tale, rightly understood, is a moral lesson of no inconsiderable force."

The New York Observer (1852): "The writer of this volume, we believe, had high intentions of doing a great and good thing: it has marks of genius, truth, and feeling in it, and much of it is greatly to our mind."

The Literary World (1852): "This is a work of more ambitious aim than that of the generality of brief works of fiction. The character of the heroine is powerfully sustained, the subordinate characters well developed, and the work elevated and healthy in tone."

True Democrat (1852): "She evidently possesses great facility with the pen, and bids fair to make rapid progress in the path of letters. From a perusal of this new work, we have no hesitation in saying that she possesses a comprehensive, inventive, and brilliant mind, capable of conceiving strange scenes and positions, and reasoning upon them in sparkling language."

Troy Daily Times (1852): "The Pilgrimage is fraught throughout with scenes of thrilling interest-romantic, yet possessing a naturalness that seems to stamp them as real; the style is flowing and easy, chaste and beautiful."

Christian Freeman (1852): "Miss Chesebro' is evidently a thinker-she skims not the mere surface of life, but plunges boldly into the hidden mysteries of the spirit, by which she is warranted in making her startling revelations of human passion.”

Albany Argus (1852): "There comes out in this book the evidence of an inventive mind, a cultivated taste, an exquisite sensibility, and a deep knowledge of human nature."

New York Evangelist (1852): "It is a charming book, pervaded by a vein of pure ennobling thought."-Troy Whig. "There is no one who will doubt that this is a courageous and able work, displaying genius and depth of feeling, and striking at a high and noble aim."

Arthur's Home Gazette (1852): "There is a fine vein of tenderness running through the story, which is peculiarly one of passion and sentiment."

Christian Intelligencer (1852): "We have here a picture of the pilgrimage of life, made by one who has climbed the hill sufficiently high to make a retrospect of the past, give much of actual experience, and dart a glance along the vista lying before. Whoever follows her attentively through this volume will be the better fitted for the journey which all on earth must travel."

Richmond Religious Herald (1852): "This is the production of a writer of considerable fancy, and good descriptive powers."

Boston Evening Gazette (1852): "She holds a ready pen, and the pages evince a woman of deep thought."
