= Béni Grosschmid =

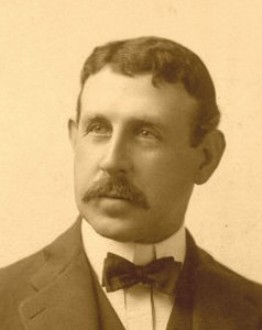
Béni Grosschmid

Béni Grosschmid (6 November 1852 – 7 September 1938), also known as Beno Zsögöd, was a Hungarian jurist. With Gusztáv Szászy-Schwarz, he was the leading Hungarian scholar of civil law at around the turn of the century.

Grosschmid served in the administration, the courts and since 1882 as professor of Austrian and Hungarian civil law at the universities of Budapest and Kolozsvár. He drafted the first codifications of Hungarian family and marriage law. In the domains of property and inheritance law, he argued for a revival of feudalist Hungarian private law, but his works also pioneered a capitalist code of commerce.
