= Eva Kinney Griffith =

American novelist

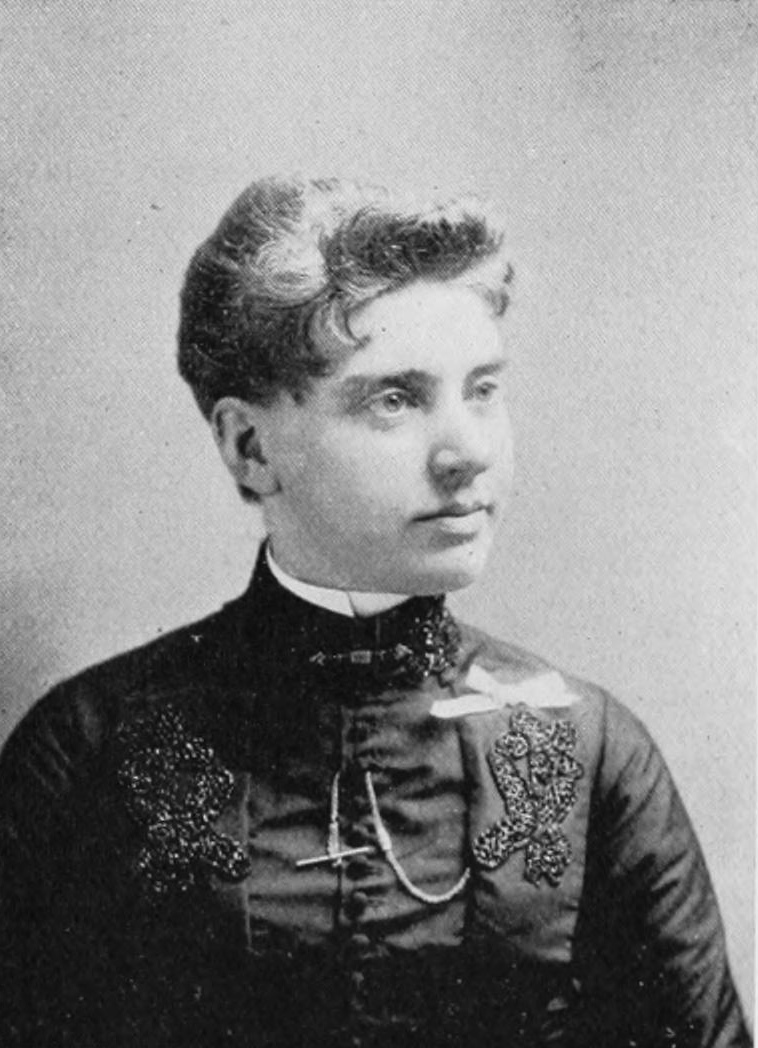
- Photo in A Woman of the Century
- Born: Eva Kinney; November 8, 1852; Whitewater, Wisconsin, U.S.
- Died: 1918 (aged 65–66)
- Education: Whitewater State Normal School
- Occupations: Journalist; activist; novelist; editor; publisher
- Spouse(s): Charles E. Griffith (m. 1891) Mr. Miller
- Writing career
- Language: English
- Literary movement: temperance

Eva Kinney Griffith Miller (née, Kinney; after first marriage, Griffith; after second marriage, Miller; November 8, 1852 – 1918) was an American journalist, temperance activist, novelist, newspaper editor, and journal publisher. She served as a lecturer and organizer of the Wisconsin Woman's Christian Temperance Union (WCTU) for several years. Her illustrated lectures lead to her being referred to as "Wisconsin Chalk Talker." She wrote temperance lessons and poems for the Temperance Banner and The Union Signal. She also published a temperance novel A Woman's Evangel (Chicago, 1892), having already put out a volume named Chalk Talk Handbook (1887), and True Ideal, a journal devoted to purity and faith studies. In 1891, Miller moved to Chicago where she became a special writer for the Daily News Record, and afterwards, an editor on the Chicago Times, and by this means, she made public her views on temperance.

== Early life and education ==
Eva Kinney was born in Whitewater, Wisconsin, November 8, 1852. She was a daughter of Francis Kinney and Sophronia Goodrich Kinney.

She entered Whitewater State Normal School in 1868, graduating in the class of 1871.

== Career ==
After completing her education, Griffith taught one term in Elkhorn, Wisconsin and two terms in Cold Spring, Wisconsin before spending one year in Chicago, where she entered the field of journalism. She wrote for the Detroit Free Press, Pomeroy's Democrat, the Educational Weekly, the Cincinnati Saturday Night, and many other journals. Overwork broke her health in 1878, and in the following year, she went to Kansas to recuperate. She returned to teaching in 1879 and again in 1883, in Hays City, Kansas. She was not able to resume writing to any great extent until 1883.

In May 1891, she married Charles E. Griffith, and they moved to St. Louis, Missouri. The marriage proved a mistake. They separated, and Griffith returned to Whitewater, entering the temperance movement in 1883. For seven years, she was a lecturer and organizer of the Wisconsin WCTU, her illustrated lectures winning her the nickname of "Wisconsin Chalk Talker." She wrote temperance lessons and poems for the Temperance Banner, and was a regular contributor to the Union Signal, writing the semi-monthly "Queen's Garden" for that journal. She also wrote for the Woman's News.

Griffith published a temperance novel, A Woman's Evangel (Chicago, 1892), and a volume entitled Chalk Talk Hand-Book (1887). In 1889, she published the True Ideal, a journal devoted to social purity and faith studies. In 1891, she removed to Chicago, where she became a special writer for the Daily News-Record and afterward, society editor of the Chicago Times.

== Personal life ==
She later married Mr. Miller and they removed to Anna, Illinois and then Peoria, Illinois where in 1918, Griffith died.

== Selected works ==
- Chalk Talk Hand-Book, 1887
- A woman's evangel, 1892
