= Ella Maria Ballou =

American writer, stenographer and reporter (1852-1937)

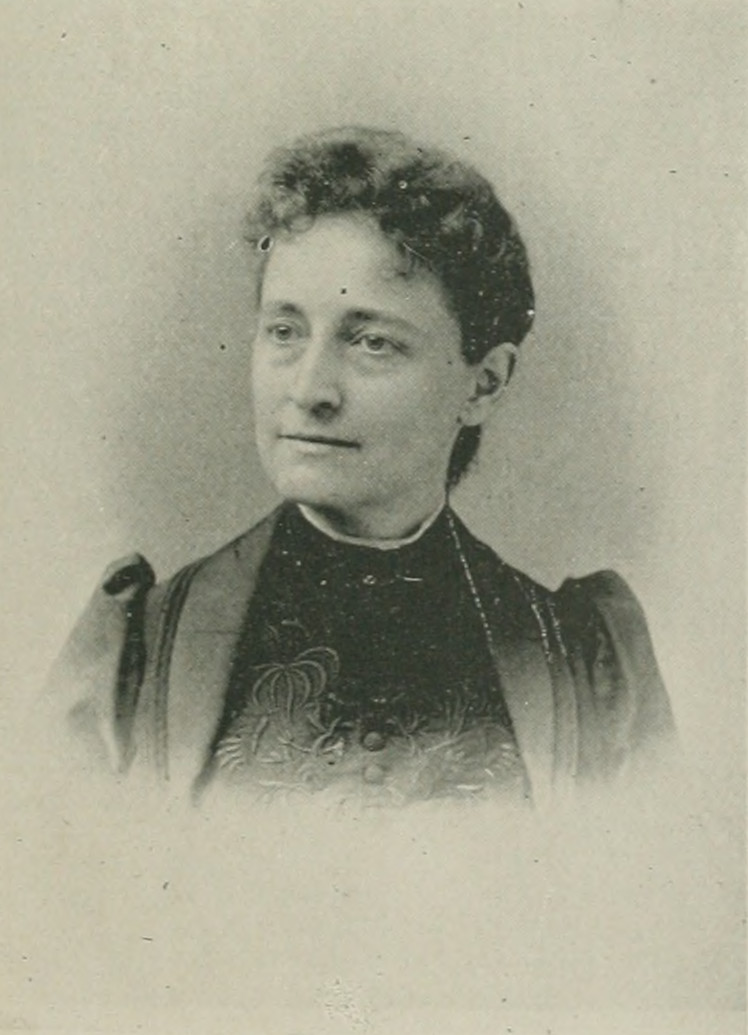
- Photo in A Woman of the Century
- Born: Ella Maria Ballou; November 15, 1852; Wallingford, Vermont, U.S.
- Died: July 29, 1937 (aged 84)
- Resting place: North Smithfield, Rhode Island, U.S.
- Occupation: writer
- Writing career
- Genres: stenography, court reporter, essaies

Ella Maria Ballou (November 15, 1852 – July 29, 1937) was an American writer who worked as a stenographer, reporter, and essayist. She started her career as a teacher, but finding the compensation for women in this career was too small, she learned shorthand. Ballou became so proficient that she worked in the courts and wrote evidence and arguments, becoming known among attorneys. In 1885, upon the numerous applications of the Rutland County Bar, Judge W. G. Veazey in the Vermont Supreme Court, appointed Ballous the Official Reporter of the Rutland County Court; she was the first woman to hold such a position in the state of Vermont, and it is believed, in the U.S. She also engaged in literary work.

== Early life and education ==
Ella Maria Ballou was born in Wallingford, Vermont, November 15, 1852, and spent her life in her native state. She was educated in the Wallingford high school.

== Career ==
Immediately after leaving school, she began teaching, in which vocation she was successful, but was rebellious over what she considered the injustice of requiring her to accept for equal service a much smaller compensation than was paid to a man of equal or less ability. After a few years of labor as a teacher, she learned shorthand and adopted it as a life-work. The persistence and thoroughness that had been a characteristic of her girlhood manifested itself in her work, and she went into the courts and wrote out evidence and argument until she became noted for accuracy and skill, and in 1885, upon the unanimous application of the Rutland County Bar. Hon. Wheelock G. Veazey, Judge of the Supreme Court, appointed her the official reporter of Rutland County Court. Hers was the first appointment of a woman as official stenographer in Vermont, if not in the United States, her success in her work has been marked and she has also been appointed official reporter of the adjoining county of Addison.

When not in court, Ballou did general work in her profession. She also did some literary work in the line of essays and addresses. Ballou was a practical example of what may be done by women, and while she earnestly claimed her rights as a woman and her full right to have as much pay for her labor as is paid to a man for the same service, she did not support suffrage or hold office.

== Death ==
Ella Maria Ballou died July 29, 1937. She is buried at the Ballou-Tifft Lot in North Smithfield, Rhode Island.
