= Mathew Carey Lea =

American chemist (1823–1897)

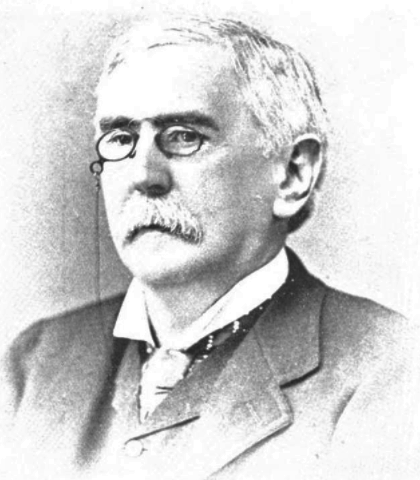
- Born: August 18, 1823; Philadelphia, Pennsylvania, U.S.
- Died: March 15, 1897 (aged 73); Philadelphia, Pennsylvania, U.S.
- Burial place: Laurel Hill Cemetery, Philadelphia, Pennsylvania, U.S.
- Occupations: Chemist, lawyer
- Spouses: Elizabeth Jaudon (m. 1852; died 1881): Eva Lovering
- Relatives: Isaac Lea (father); Frances Anne Carey (mother); Henry Charles Lea (brother); Henry Charles Carey (uncle); Matthew Carey (grandfather)

Mathew Carey Lea (August 18, 1823 – March 15, 1897) was an American chemist known for his research on the chemical and physical properties of silver halide salts and their usage in photography. He pioneered early work in mechanochemistry and developed Carey Lea Silver, a photochemical still in use today.

== Early life and education ==
Lea was born in Philadelphia on August 16, 1823. His father, Isaac Lea was a publisher, conchologist and geologist. His grandfather was Mathew Carey, the Irish-American publisher and economist.

He received his education through private tutors including the mathematician Eugenius Nulty. Lea received a classical education including the trivium (grammar, logic and rhetoric), quadrivium (arithmetic, geometry, music and celestial navigation). classical languages and history. Nulty immersed Lea in a single subject for long periods to encourage its complete mastery. Lea also received instruction in the Booth & Boy private chemical laboratory.

On July 14, 1852, Lea married Elizabeth Jaudon (1827–1881), sister of his brother, Henry Charles Lea's wife. Elizabeth had earlier married merchant William Bakewell, but Blakewell had died in Cincinnati in 1850, leaving her with a young daughter. The couple had a son, George Henry Lea (1853–1915), who helped in the family publishing business. After Elizabeth's death, Carey Lea married Eva Lovering, daughter of Harvard Professor Joseph Lovering, but they had no children.

== Career ==
Lea became interested in photography and in 1840, created a series of images of his father's plant and shells collection that was displayed at the American Philosophical Society.

Lea read the law under the tutelage of prominent attorney William M. Meredith, and in 1847 was admitted to the Pennsylvania Bar. The highly successful family publishing firm published some legal books. However, Lea was sickly, and left the practice of law to travel to Europe and other places for his health, as well as to pursue his scientific avocation.

Lea worked in the laboratory of Professor James C. Booth, and constructed a laboratory in his home in Philadelphia's Chestnut Hill neighborhood. In 1841, the American Journal of Science and Arts published his first paper at his father's request, "On the First, or Southern Coal Field of Pennsylvania" and that publisher would ultimately publish approximately 100 more. In July 1864, he published two papers concerning aspects of platinum.

Lea devoted himself chiefly to the chemistry of photography, to which he made a number of important contributions. He was recognized as an authority on the chemical and physical attributes of silver halide salts and their usage in photography. He also published 300 technical articles and correspondences in the British Journal of Photography, as well as a book on photography entitled, A Manual of Photography: Intended as a Text Book for Beginners and a Book of Reference for Advanced Photographers. His publications include numerous papers on the chemical action of light. He is also known for his development of Carey Lea Silver, a photochemical, still in use today.

Due to the loss of an eye during an experiment with picric acid, and his constantly ill condition, Lea spent most of his time in solitude. As a result, few chemists knew Lea personally, his only interaction with the science community was the publication of his studies.

He was not associated with any universities. In 1848, he joined the Franklin Institute and took a special interest in the chemistry section. In 1895, he was elected to the National Academy of Sciences.

== Death and legacy ==
Lea died on March 15, 1897, at his Chestnut Hill home from complications of a prostate cancer operation. He was interred at Laurel Hill Cemetery in Philadelphia. He ordered his notebooks destroyed, and they were, which has complicated research into his work. Along with other charitable bequests, Lea bequeathed his books and scientific apparatus to the Franklin Institute, plus funds to allow the institution to continue to purchase books and periodicals.

His contributions to mechanical chemistry exceed the contributions to photography for which he received acclaim in his lifetime.

== Publications ==
- On the First, or Southern Coal Field of Pennsylvania, The American Journal of Science, Volume 40, pages 370–374, 1841
- A Manual of Photography: Intended as a Text Book for Beginners and a Book of Reference for Advanced Photographers, Benerman & Wilson, Philadelphia, 1868

== Sources ==
- Barker, George F. (1903). Biographical Memoir of Matthew Carey Lea, 1823-1897 (PDF). National Academy of Sciences.
