= Henry Carey Baird =

American publisher born in 1825

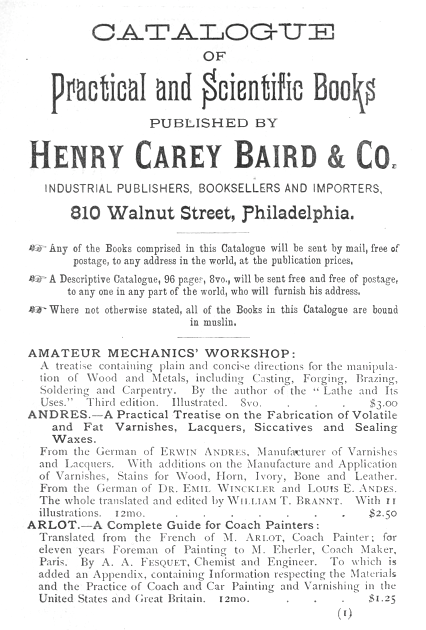

Henry Carey Baird (September 10, 1825 - December 31, 1912) was a publisher in the United States who was politically active. He wrote and testified on economic issues in the United States. The New York Public Library has a folder of his letters. His publishing business was in Philadelphia, Pennsylvania.

== Early life ==
He was born at the arsenal in Bridesburg, Philadelphia the son of officer Thomas J. Baird and Eliza Carey Baird. Henry Charles Carey was his uncle (mom's brother). He had grandparents that immigrated from Ireland.

== Career ==
He began his career at his uncle Edward L. Carey's publishing firm Carey & Hart for several years before establishing his own in 1849. He left the Republican Party to help found the Greenback Party He helped defeat legislation for a bond issue. His views on it were published in 1876. His writings on the "National Finances" were published in 1877. In 1878 he testified on specie payments. His letters to the New York Daily News on the "Irish Question" were published.

"General Washington and General Jackson, on Negro soldiers", readable pdf

He printed books on financial and political subjects. He printed "Washington and General Jackson on negro soldiers". Gen. Banks on the bravery of negro troops. Poem--the Second Louisiana", Printed for gratuitous distribution (1863).

He was the first commercial publisher in the United States that specialized in industrial texts and he was a publisher into the early 20th century.

He wrote a memoir about Colonel Alexander Biddle. He wrote to Mellen Chamberlain in 1849. His firm printed catalogues of "Practical & Scientific Books by Henry C Baird". He published a memoir of Henry Charles Carey, the publisher who was his mom's brother.

== Personal life ==
In 1850, Baird married Elizabeth Davis Pennington. The two had just one daughter. Baird's wife later died in 1901, leaving him a widower.

== Death ==
On December 31, 1912, Baird died in his apartment in Wayne, Pennsylvania.

== Select publishings ==
- The Encyclopedia of Chemistry by James Curtis Booth and Campbell Morfit
- The Poetical Works of Thomas Gray (1851), a collection from Thomas Gray's writings
- The Painter, Gilder, and Varnisher's Companion (1867)
- The Modern Practice of Photography by Reginald William Thomas (1868)
- Gothic Album for Cabinet Makers; Comprising a collection of Designs for Gothic Furniture (1868)
- "Lord Bateman's plea for limited protection or for reciprocity in free trade" by William Bateman-Hanbury, 2nd Baron Bateman (1878)
- Miscellaneous works of Henry C. Carey; with a memoir by Dr. William Elder (1883), about Henry Charles Carey
- "The American System: Speeches on the tariff question, and on internal improvements, principally delivered in the House of Representatives of the United States by Andrew Stewart, Late M. C. from Pennsylvania" (1872)
- The prospector's field-book and guide in search for and the easy determination of ores and other useful minerals (1896)
