= Henry Charles Lea =

American activist (1825–1909)

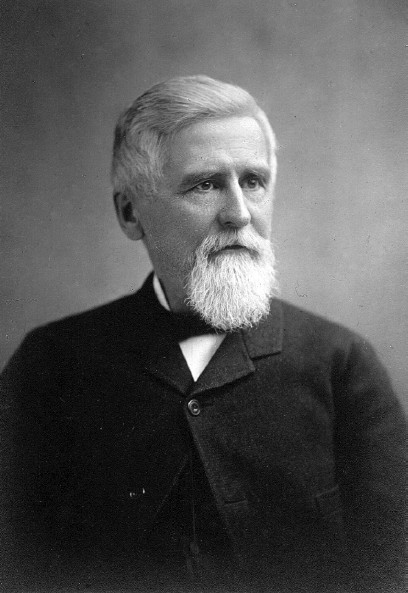
- Lea, c. 1870
- Born: September 19, 1825; Philadelphia, Pennsylvania, U.S.
- Died: October 24, 1909 (aged 84); Philadelphia, Pennsylvania, U.S.
- Resting place: Laurel Hill Cemetery, Philadelphia, Pennsylvania, U.S.
- Known for: Publisher, civic activist, philanthropist, historian
- Spouse: Anna Caroline Jaudon (m. 1850)
- Children: 4
- Parents: Isaac Lea (father); Frances Anne Carey (mother)
- Relatives: Mathew Carey Lea (brother); Matthew Carey (grandfather); Henry Charles Carey (uncle)

Henry Charles Lea (September 19, 1825 – October 24, 1909) was an American publisher, civic activist, philanthropist and historian from Philadelphia, Pennsylvania.

He took over the family publishing business from his father, Isaac Lea, and implemented several medical and scientific publications. The business operated under various names including Lea Brothers & Co., Lea & Febiger and Blanchard & Lea until his sons took over the business in 1880.

He promoted health projects including the Lea Laboratory of Hygiene at the University of Pennsylvania and the Pennsylvania Epileptic Hospital and Colony Farm. He organized the Citizens' Municipal Reform Association of Philadelphia to fight corruption in city government. He was a founding member of the Union League of Philadelphia during the American Civil War. He managed publications and supported their efforts for recruitment of Union Army soldiers, including African-Americans. He helped found the National Republican League to prevent a third U.S. presidential term for Ulysses S. Grant.

Lea wrote multiple books focused on church history, especially the Spanish Inquisition. He received honorary degrees from Harvard University, Princeton University, University of Giessen, University of Moscow, and University of Pennsylvania. He was a member of multiple learned societies and served as president of the American Historical Association in 1903.

== Early life and education ==
Lea was born on September 19, 1825, in Philadelphia, Pennsylvania to Isaac Lea and Frances Anne Carey. His father was a publisher and amateur scientist.

Through private tutors including the mathematician Eugenius Nulty. Lea received a classical education. It covered the trivium (grammar, logic and rhetoric), quadrivium (arithmetic, geometry, music and celestial navigation), classical languages and history. Nulty immersed Lea in a single subject for long periods with a view to mastery, with advanced lessons. Lea also demonstrated a facility for languages and analytical thought. In 1832, he studied for a brief time at a school in Paris, France. Lea worked too in the Booth & Boy chemical laboratory, and he published his first paper, at age 13, on manganese salts.

Lea received an LLD from Harvard University and the University of Pennsylvania.

Lea followed his father's interest in natural history and wrote several papers on descriptive conchology. He discovered and named 133 new species of mollusks and two new genera. He also displayed drawing talent and illustrated his own early articles about fossil shells that he had collected. His drawings were also used for the engravings illustrating his father's revision of the Synopsis of the Naiades in 1838. Lea developed an interest in poetry and at his mother's suggestion, translated Greek poets and composed original verse. Later, he often wrote satirical parodies of popular songs about politics.

== Career ==
=== Publisher ===
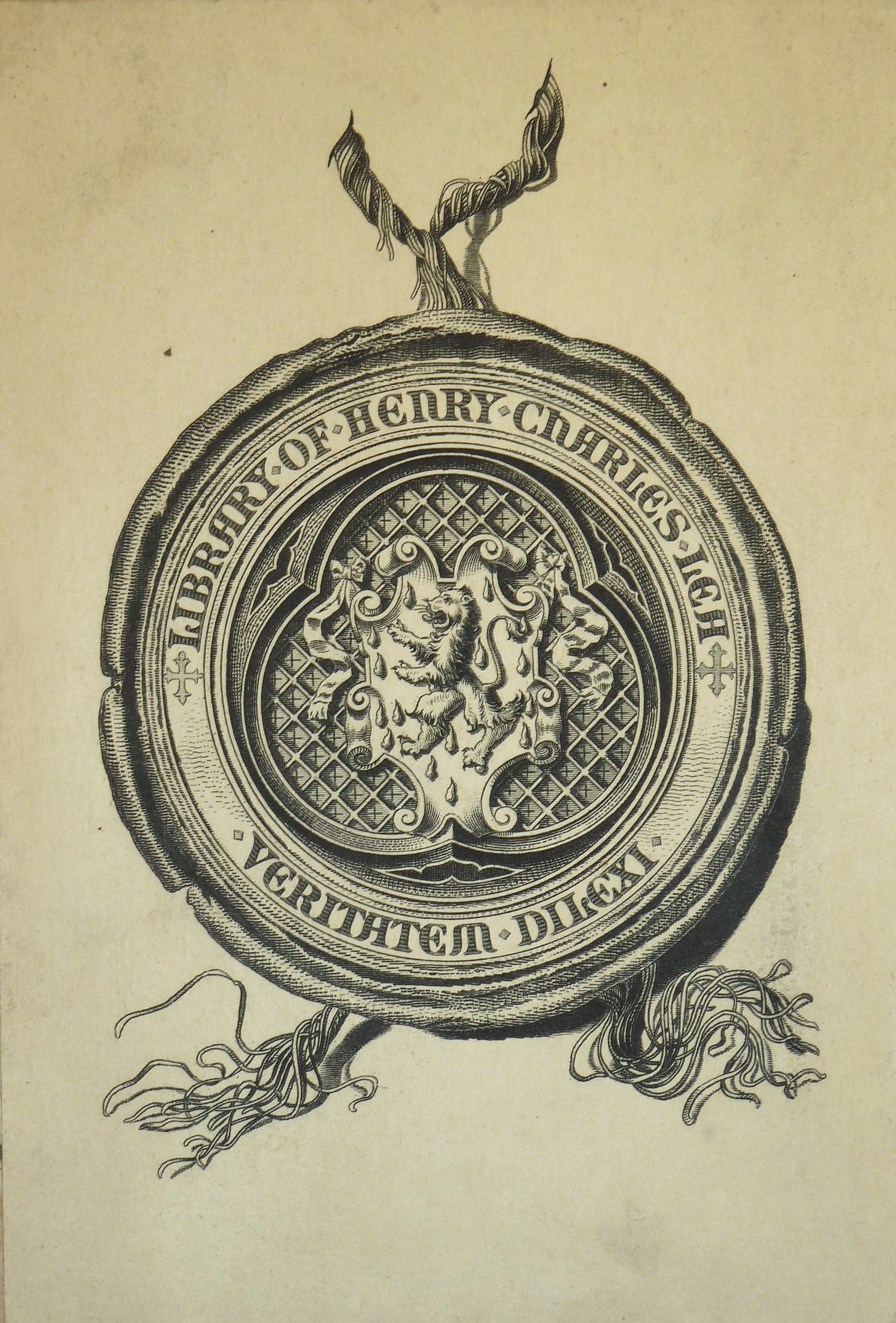
Henry Charles Lea bookplate

In 1843, Lea joined his father's publishing business as a clerk and became a junior partner in 1851.

In 1847, after working in the family publishing firm for four years, Lea suffered a nervous breakdown and abandoned his intellectual and scientific work for eleven years. Silas Weir Mitchell treated him, and became a family friend. During his convalescence, Lea began reading French memoirs of the medieval period. They kindled his interest in medieval history and changed his career course from scientist to historian.

Lea focused the firm on medical and scientific publications. The company operated under several names including Lea Brothers & Co., Lea & Febinger and Blanchard & Lea in 1865. He continued to work with the firm until 1880 when his sons took over the business.

=== Civic activism and philanthropy ===
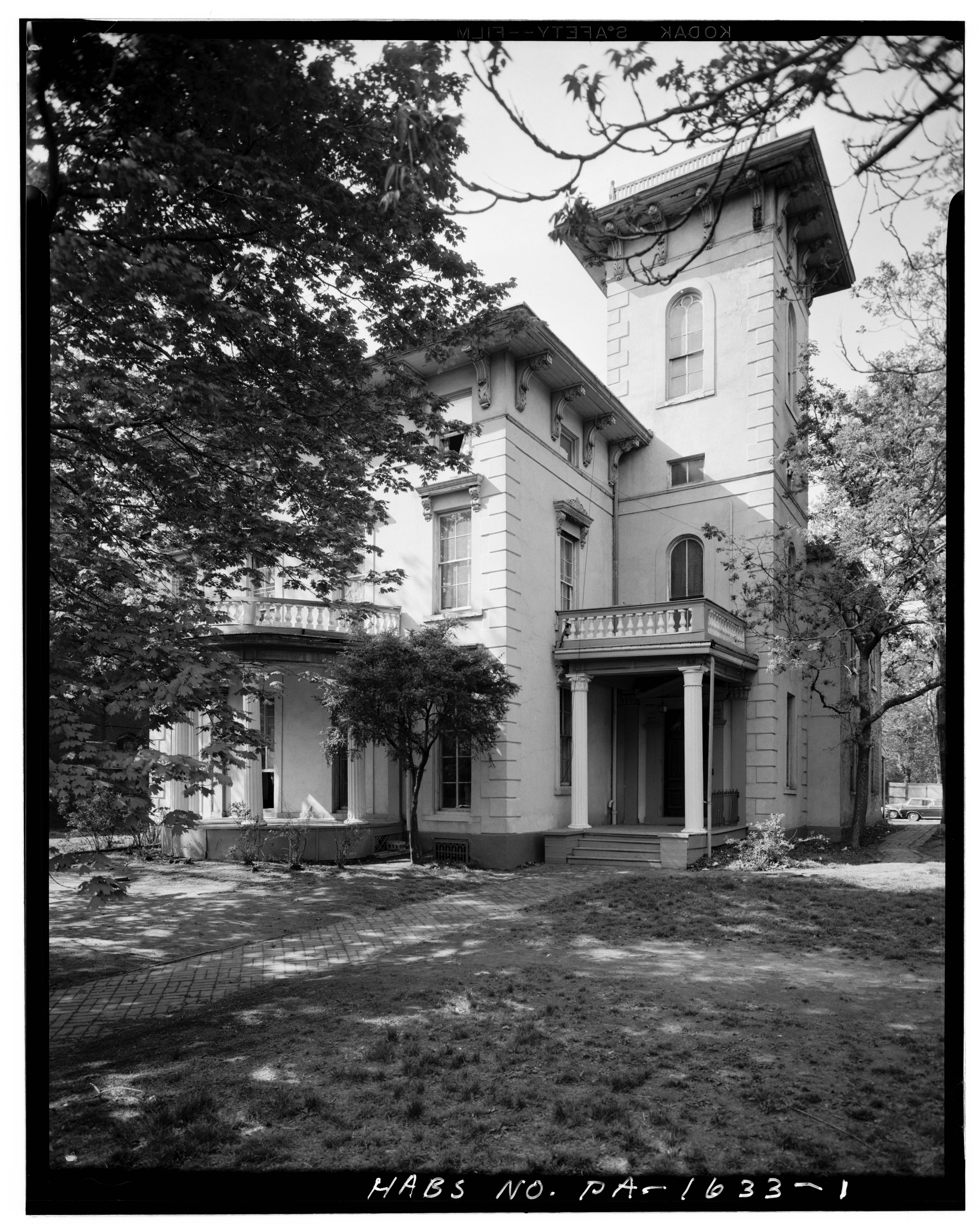
Henry Charles Lea House at 3903 Spruce Street in Philadelphia

In 1844, Lea stood guard with a musket for two days and two nights in front of a Catholic Church to prevent property damage during the Philadelphia nativist riots.

He was a member of the Union League of Philadelphia at its inception in 1862 and served on the Board of Directors, the Military Committee and the Committee of Publications. He wrote many of the pamphlets published by the organization. In 1863 Lea was appointed one of the Bounty Commissioners under the Enrollment Act and served until 1865, working closely with Provost Marshal General James B. Fry accounting for the city's quotas of enlisted men. He was also involved with recruiting African American regiments to fight in the Union army.

He served as president of the Philadelphia branch of the American Social Science Association and as a member of the Industrial League. In 1871, he organized the Citizens' Municipal Reform Association of Philadelphia which focused on fighting corruption in city government. He served on the board of directors for the Philadelphia Library.

Outspoken about public works and health projects in Philadelphia, Lea founded the Lea Laboratory of Hygiene at the University of Pennsylvania. He strongly opposed the building of City Hall at the Penn Square location at the intersection of Broad and Market Streets, then known as High Street, where it now stands, preferring instead that it be built in Washington Square, near Independence Hall. Lea believed that the project cost too much, and was angered by the political corruption involved in the awarding of contracts and purchase of building materials. Lea planned and held a large public meeting to recruit support for his alternative to the Penn Square project.

He helped initiate the National Republican League to prevent Ulysses S. Grant's third term as president of the United States. The National Republican League chose Lea as its president in 1880 (the year he retired from his publishing business) and five years later, Lea served as president of the Association of Republicans and Independents. In 1891 he helped found "The Reform Political League of Pennsylvania", with Herbert Welsh as president, himself and Justus C. Strawbridge as vice-presidents, and Charles E. Richardson as secretary.

Lea joined with others in 1884 and filed a lawsuit to oppose building a large slaughterhouse on the Schuylkill River at 30th and Spruce Streets on land owned by the Pennsylvania Railroad Company, citing the pollution of the river, the stench, and devaluation of properties near the plant. He also opposed the construction of the Market Street elevated train, over properties he owned on Market Street, as well as building the "boulevard" from City Hall northwest to Fairmount Park, where the Philadelphia Museum of Art was later built.

In 1888, Lea doubled the size of the reading rooms and book shelves at the Philadelphia Library. In 1897, he built several buildings for the Pennsylvania Epileptic Hospital and Colony Farm in Oakbourne, Pennsylvania.

=== Historian ===
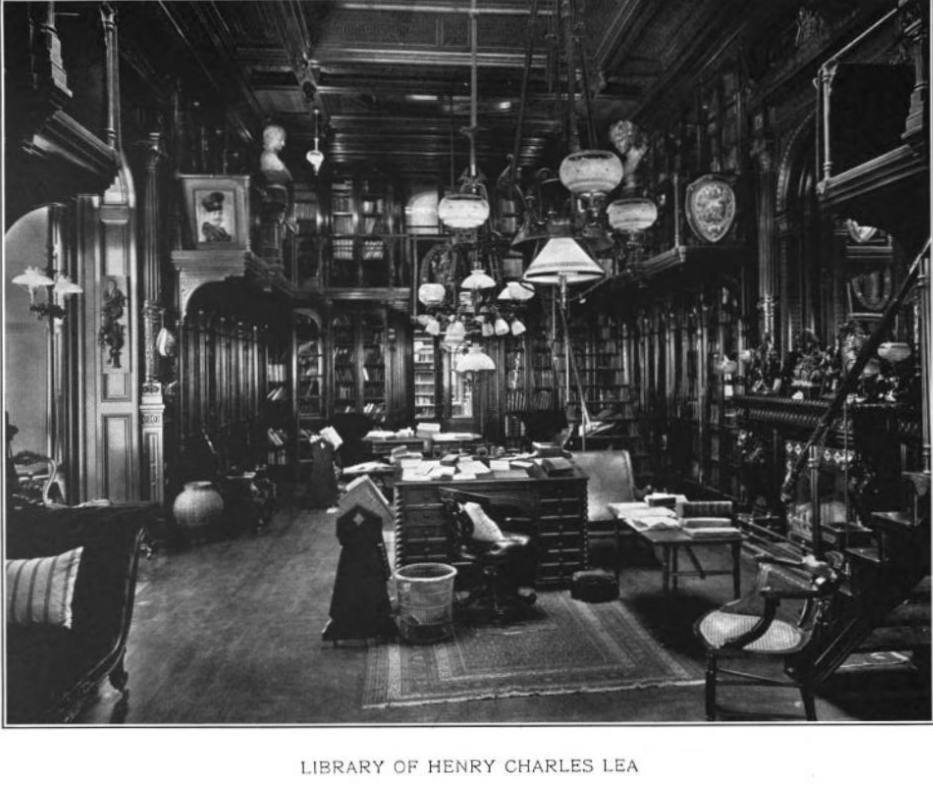
Library of Henry Charles Lea

Lea focused on church history in the later Middle Ages, and on institutional, legal, and ecclesiastical history, as well as magic and witchcraft. He also did significant work on the history of the Italian city-states. His active writing career on historical subjects spanned more than fifty years, during which Lea published ten books and numerous articles. His literary reputation rests largely on those books. Highly disciplined work habits (and the ability to purchase manuscripts in Europe and Latin America and have them shipped to Philadelphia) led Lea to continue writing despite headaches and eye problems. His productivity increased during his final twenty-five years after he retired as a publisher and built an extension to his house at 2000 Walnut Street, for his extensive manuscript collection.

Lea became an authority on the Spanish Inquisition, and his multi-volume work was considered groundbreaking, although opinionated, and some criticized him for anti-Catholic bias. Lea received honorary degrees from universities including Harvard, Princeton and the University of Pennsylvania in the United States, and overseas institutions such as the University of Giessen and the University of Moscow. His study of the Inquisition was also criticized for anti-Spanish bias, which Julián Juderías in 1914 termed the 'leyenda negra' (a/k/a Black legend).

He was a member of multiple historical societies including the Royal Academy of Bavaria, the Comenius-Gesellschaft of Berlin, the Reale Accademia dei Lincei of Rome, the Societa Internazionale di Studi Francescani of Assisi, the Reale Societa Roman della Storia Patria, the Royal Society of Arts in London, the Royal Society of Antiquities in Scotland, the Jewish Historical Society of England and a corresponding fellow of the British Academy.

Lea became a member of the newly formed American Historical Association in 1884, contributed several articles to its American Historical Review, and was elected its president in 1903. He was elected a member of the American Antiquarian Society in 1888. When the second annual meeting of the newly formed American Folklore Society was held in Philadelphia in 1889, Lea met with some of the founders, sent an article for publication in the Society's journal, and became the first life-member of the organization.

== Personal life ==
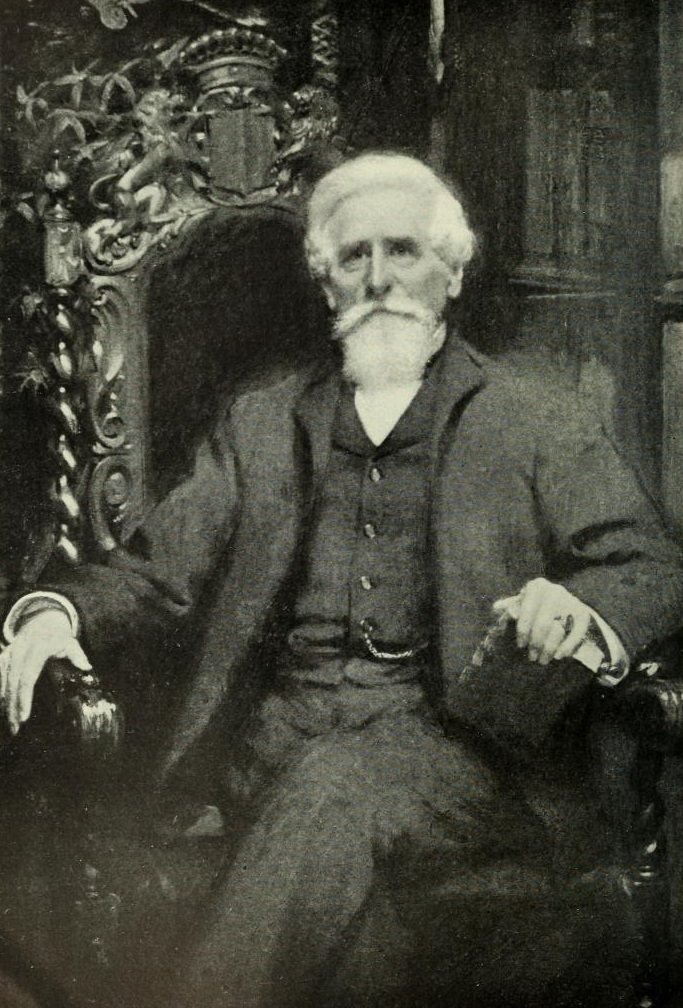
Portrait of Henry Charles Lea

His father, Isaac Lea (1792–1886) was a distinguished naturalist and member of the American Philosophical Society, and publisher. Isaac Lea was descended from a Philadelphia Quaker family, and had been born in Wilmington, Delaware. On March 8, 1821, Isaac married Frances Anne Carey (1799–1873), daughter of Mathew Carey, the Philadelphia publisher whose business he ultimately took over.

On May 27, 1850, Henry Charles Lea married his first cousin and orphan Anna Caroline Jaudon (1824–1912). Her father, merchant William Latta Jaudon (1798–1832) of Bucks County, Pennsylvania had died in Cincinnati, Ohio when she was a child, followed four years later by her mother, Susan Gibson Lea Jaudon (1799–1836). The Jaudons were a wealthy Huguenot family from Soubise, France, and after the Edict of Nantes Peter Jaudon emigrated to Bucks County (and his family became Presbyterians), and Elie Jaudon emigrated to South Carolina. Perhaps the most noteworthy members were the teacher Daniel Jaudon (1767–1826, Anna Caroline's grandfather) and the financier Samuel Jaudon. Two years later Lea's brother Mathew Carey Lea married her sister Elizabeth (1827–1881), whose husband merchant William Bakewell had died in Cincinnati in 1850, leaving her with a young daughter.

In 1878, Lea became seriously ill and was almost blind. He was invalid from 1880 to 1884 and used that time to revisit his literary interests.

== Death and legacy ==
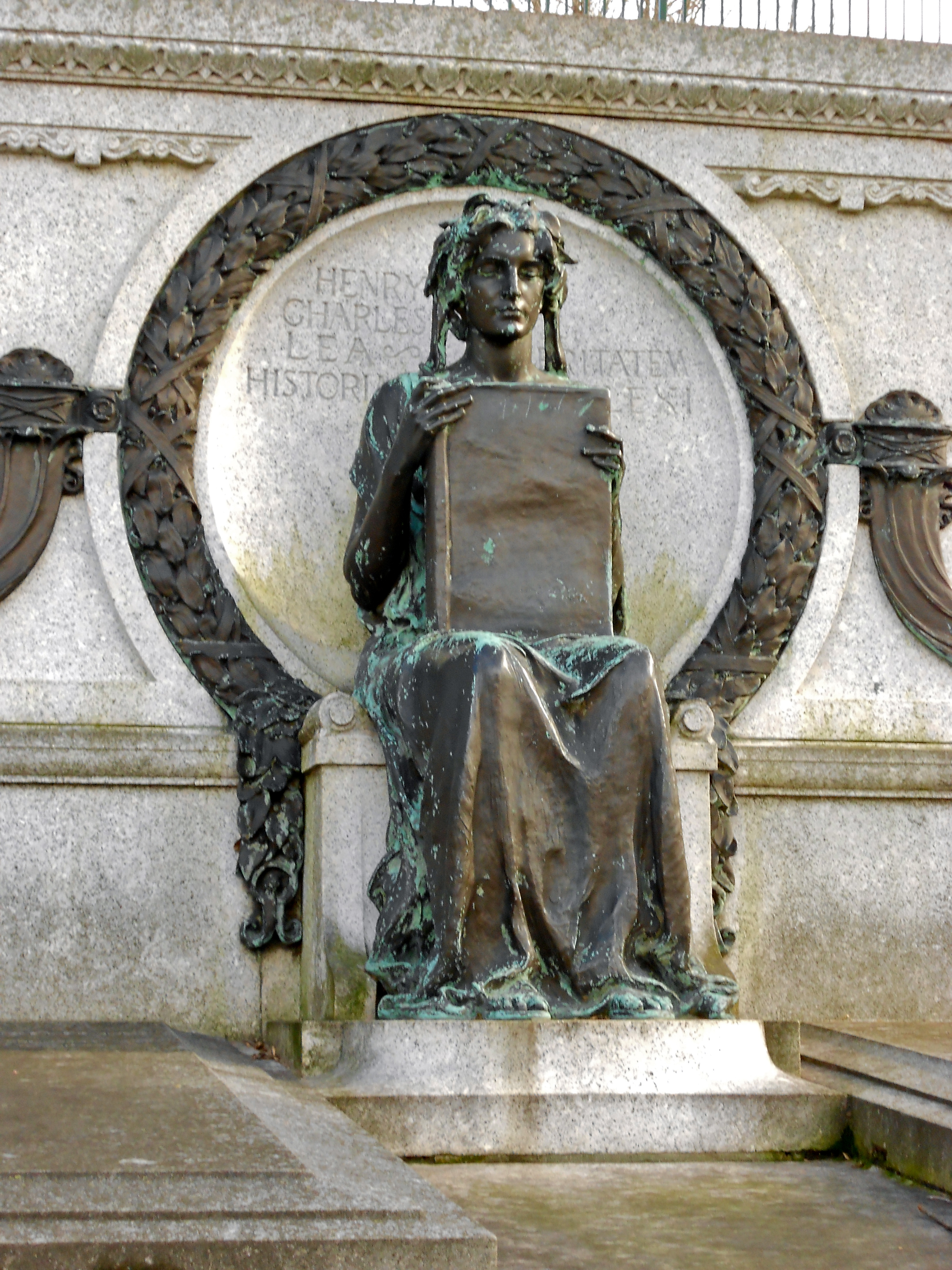
Lea's tomb at Laurel Hill Cemetery is adorned with a sculpture of Clio, the muse of history, by Alexander Stirling Calder.

Lea died of pneumonia on October 24, 1909, in Philadelphia and was interred at Laurel Hill Cemetery.

In 1914, the Henry C. Lea Elementary School in Philadelphia was named in his honor.

His personal collection of purchased manuscripts and incunabula as well as other early printed books was bequeathed to the University of Pennsylvania. In 1925, the university dedicated a library, which it named in his honor and which includes much of that personal collection of books and manuscripts. Since 1962, the collection has been located in the Van Pelt-Dietrich Library Center which is now a part of the Kislak Center for Special Collections, Rare Books and Manuscripts.

In 1933, Lea's son Arthur donated four Greek vases that belonged to his father to the Penn Museum.

== Works ==
- Superstition and Force: Essays on the Wager of Law, the Wager of Battle, the Ordeal, Torture Henry C. Lea, 1866.
- Historical Sketch of Sacerdotal Celibacy, J. B. Lippincott & Co., 1867.
- Studies in Church History. The Rise of the Temporal Power - Benefit of clergy - Excommunication, Henry C. Lea, 1869.
- Translations and Other Rhymes, Privately Printed, 1882.
- A History of the Inquisition of the Middle Ages, Vol. 2, Vol. 3, The Macmillan Company, 1906 [1st Pub. New York, Harper & Brothers, 1887].
- Chapters from the Religious History of Spain Connected with the Inquisition, Lea Brothers & Co., 1890.
- A Formulary of the Papal Penitentiary in the 17th Century, Lea Brothers & Co., 1892.
- The Absolution Formula of the Templars, The Knickerbocker Press, 1893.
- A History of Auricular Confession and Indulgences in the Latin Church, Volume II, Volume III, Lea Brothers & Co., 1896.
- The Indian Policy of Spain, n.p., 1899.
- The Dead Hand; a Brief Sketch of the Relations between Church and State with Regard to Ecclesiastical Property and the Religious Orders, William J. Dornan, 1900.
- The Moriscos of Spain; their Conversion and Expulsion, Lea Brothers & Co., 1901.
- Léo Taxil, Diana Vaughan et l'Église Romaine: Histoire d'une mystification, Paris, France: Sociéte Nouvelle de Librairie et d'édition, 1901.
- Ethical Values in History, n.p., 1904.
- A History of the Inquisition of Spain, Volume II, Volume III, Volume IV, 1906–1907.
- The Inquisition in the Spanish Dependencies, The Macmillan Company, 1922 [1st Pub. 1908].
- Memoir, Privately printed, 1910.
- History of Sacerdotal Celibacy in the Christian Church (fourth edition, 1932)
- Materials Toward a History of Witchcraft, University of Pennsylvania Press, 1939.
