= Encyclopedia of Chemistry =

Encyclopedia of Chemistry, readable pdf

The Encyclipedia of Chemistry, full title The Encyclopedia of Chemistry, Practical and Theoretical: Embracing Its Application to the Arts, Metallurgy, Mineralogy, Geology, Medicine, and Pharmacy, was written by James Curtis Booth assisted by Campbell Morfit, and published in Philadelphia in 1850. Numerous editions were published. The eight volume book is 973 pages. Robert Cornelius produced daguerreotypes of Martin Hans Boyè to illustrate the book. It was published by H. C. Baird.

Booth travelled to Germany and studied production processes for papermaking and dyeing. He wrote various articles and was involved in various editing and writing projects. Booth also wrote Memoirs of the Geological Survey of the State of Delaware published in 1841 in Newark, Delaware.

Booth went on to become a melter and refiner for the United States Mint. Morfit authored the book Chemical Manipulations.
