= John Fries Frazer =

American geologist (1812-1872)

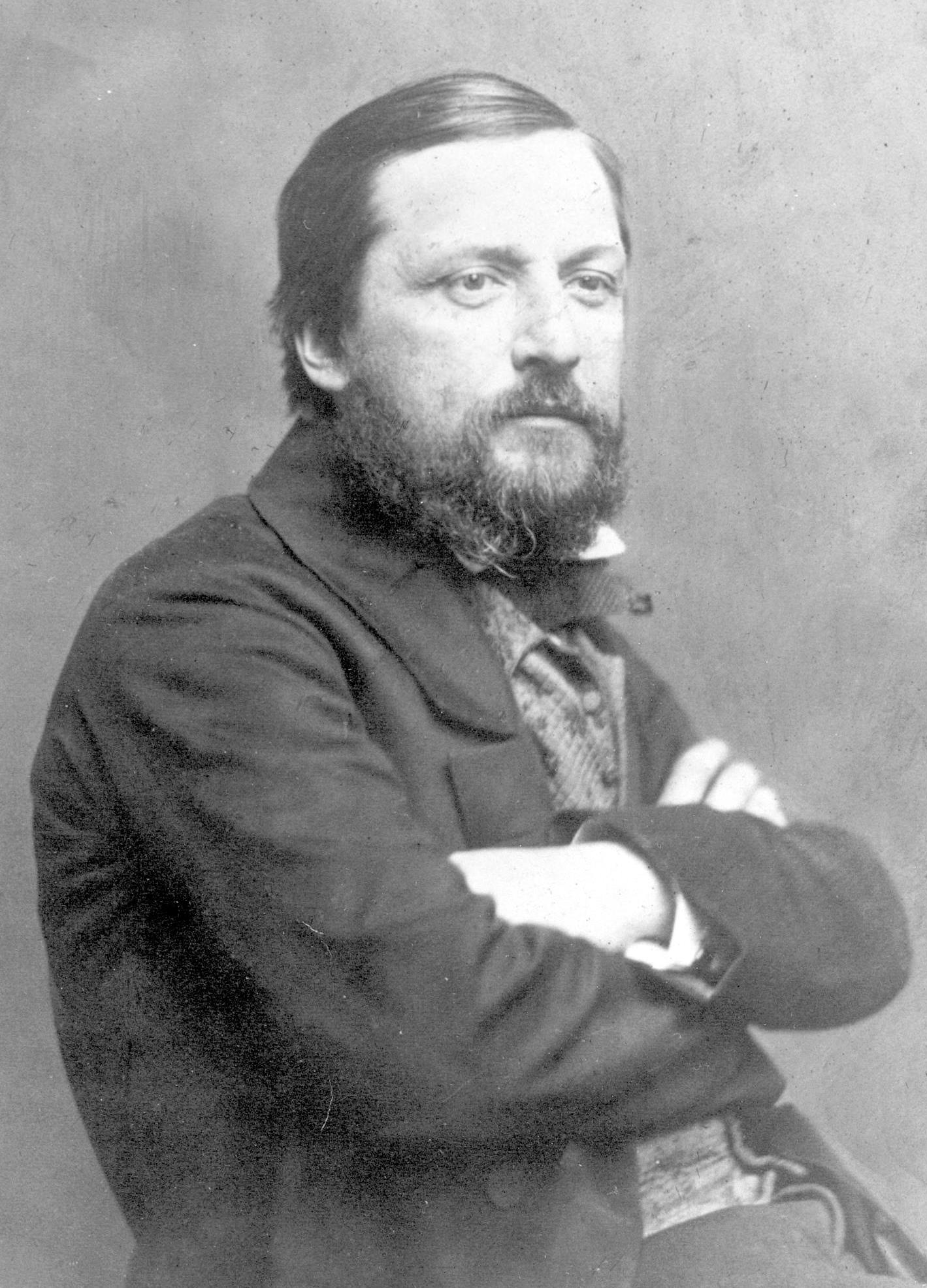
John Fries Frazer

John Fries Frazer (July 8, 1812 – October 12, 1872) was a University of Pennsylvania graduate and first assistant geologist to the Geological Survey of Pennsylvania. He became a professor of Natural philosophy and Chemistry and in later years he became Vice Provost of the University of Pennsylvania.

== Childhood ==
Frazer was born in Philadelphia on July 8, 1812, son of the successful lawyer Robert Frazer and grandson of Lieutenant Colonel Persifor Frazer, who had fought in the American Revolution. He was the youngest of five children, taking his middle name from his mother, Elizabeth Fries, who died when he was about two years old. His father died in 1820, and he was placed in the custody of his maternal grandfather, John Fries. His early education was at the school in Germantown, then at Captain Partridge's Military Academy in Connecticut for a year, after which he went to stay with Rev. Samuel B. Wylie in Philadelphia, who educated him at home.

== Higher education ==
Frazer was admitted to the University of Pennsylvania in 1828, where he became interested in science. While at the university, and for some time after graduating, he assisted in the laboratory of professor Alexander Dallas Bache, where he studied magnetic variance and the Aurora Borealis. He then studied law, and briefly practiced as a lawyer from 1833, before turning to the study of medicine. He became a member of the Academy of Natural Sciences in September 1835 and of the Franklin Institute in November 1835. He assisted in the geological survey of Pennsylvania in 1836, under professor Henry Darwin Rogers. Frazer was a professor at the Philadelphia high school from 1836 to 1844, when he was chosen as Professor of Chemistry and Physics at the University of Philadelphia to replace professor Bache, a position he held until his death. For a period, he studied in the laboratory that James Curtis Booth, the eminent chemist, established in 1836.

== Professor of chemistry and physics ==
Frazer gave lectures on the physical and chemical sciences at the Franklin Institute, and was editor of the institute's journal from 1850 to 1866. He received an honorary Ph.D. in 1854 from the University of Lewisburg, and in 1857 was awarded an LL.D. from Harvard University. He was elected a member of the American Philosophical Society in 1842, became secretary in 1845 and vice-president from 1855 until his resignation in 1858. He was re-elected to the society in 1867. In 1863, he was one of the original members of the National Academy of Sciences when that body was established.

Frazer married in 1838, and was to have two daughters and a son, Persifor, who later also studied at Booth's laboratory and became professor of chemistry at the university after his father's death. Frazer suffered from a disease of the liver, which caused frequent fainting fits. He was forced to take an extended vacation to Europe in 1856, and again in 1867/1868. He died suddenly of a heart attack on October 12, 1872 the day after the new university building had been inaugurated in West Philadelphia. He was interred at Laurel Hill Cemetery in Philadelphia.
