= Carey Bible =

The Carey Bible was an edition of the English-language Douay–Rheims translation of the Bible published by Mathew Carey (1760–1839) beginning in 1789. It was the first Roman Catholic version and only the second English-language translation of the Bible printed in the United States.

Carey was an expatriate Irish journalist who established himself as a printer and publisher in Philadelphia around 1784. In 1789, he announced plans to print the first American Catholic Bible and solicited subscriptions. Carey also appealed to potential Protestant subscribers, whom he invited to subscribe for copies of the Bible in order to show their lack of anti-Catholic prejudice. Among Carey's enthusiastic supporters was John Carroll, the nation's first Roman Catholic bishop (consecrated in 1789), who promoted Carey's project and himself ordered twenty copies. The price of a subscription was six dollars. The bible was completed on December 1, 1790, and was soon also available in a single volume. Probably fewer than 500 copies of the Carey Bible were printed.

Carey published two more versions of the Douay–Rheims Bible in 1805; one of these editions was reprinted in 1811 and 1816. He also published many editions of the King James Version, each carefully planned, formatted, and innovatively marketed.

== See also ==
- Douay–Rheims Bible
