= Eugenius Nulty =

- Born: 1790; Ireland
- Died: July 3, 1871 (age 82); Pennsylvania
- Occupations: Mathematician, actuary, teacher

Eugenius Nulty (1790 – July 3, 1871) was an Irish born American mathematician of the 19th century. He served on the faculty of Dickinson College from 1814 to 1816, and later taught and tutored prominent Philadelphians, including the brothers Mathew Carey Lea and Henry Charles Lea.

== Career ==
After arriving in the United States from his native Ireland, Nulty quickly became ensconced as a member of the new nation's small intelligentsia. Contemporaries described him as “brilliant”.

In 1814, Nulty became a professor of mathematics at Dickinson College, where he remained for two years. In 1816 he moved to Philadelphia at the invitation of The Philadelphia Life Insurance Company and the Pennsylvania Company, who each recruited Nulty as one of the first U.S. actuarial scientists. His new countrymen also called Nulty to assist with mathematics for the Survey of the Coast (which became the United States Coast Survey in 1836 and the United States Coast and Geodetic Survey in 1878).

In 1817, Nulty was elected a member of the American Philosophical Society. In 1823, the University of Pennsylvania awarded Nulty an honorary A.M. He was elected an Associate Fellow of the American Academy of Arts and Sciences 1832. Nulty was also a correspondent of mathematician, chemist and natural philosopher Robert M. Patterson.

Nulty contributed to the defunct Mathematical Diary, one of the 3 earliest learned mathematical journals published in the U.S. His Elements of Geometry, theoretical and practical Philadelphia: J. Wetham (1836) was one of the first two or three original geometries published in the United States and is still over 150 years later available from multiple publishers in historical reprints.

In 1840, P.J. Walker, director of the National Institute for the Promotion of Science, called Nulty "unsurpassed at home or abroad" in pure mathematics.
