= Pikesville Arsenal =

Pikesville Arsenal was a 19th-century United States Army fortification near Pikesville, Maryland, under control of the Army Ordnance Department.

== Origins ==
After War of 1812, the Army built Pikesville Arsenal at a safe point north of Baltimore, Maryland.

In 1853, Campbell Morfit established a laboratory at Pikesville Arsenal and investigated gun metal. Campbell Morfit and James Booth authored a book on the subject of gun metal for the Ordnance Department.

== American Civil War ==
Confederates lived at Pikesville Arsenal during and after the American Civil War.

== Decommissioning ==
The Army left Pikesville Arsenal in 1879. Confederate veterans lived at the former arsenal from 1888 until 1932.

State of Maryland acquired ownership of Pikesville Arsenal in 1935. The state headquartered Maryland State Police at the former arsenal since 1950. The old facility now houses the Maryland State Police Museum.
