= Henry Charles Carey =

American economist and publisher (1793–1879)

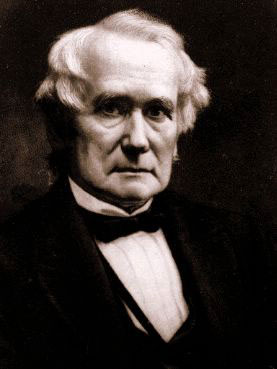
- Born: 15 December 1793; Philadelphia, Pennsylvania
- Died: 13 October 1879 (aged 85); Philadelphia, Pennsylvania
- Political party: Republican
- Spouse: Martha "Patty" Leslie
- Father: Mathew Carey
- Relatives: Charles Robert Leslie (brother-in-law); Eliza Leslie (sister-in-law)

Academic background
- Influences: Alexander Hamilton; Friedrich List

Academic work
- Discipline: Political economy
- School or tradition: American School

Henry Charles Carey (December 15, 1793 – October 13, 1879) was an American publisher, political economist, and politician from Pennsylvania. He was the leading 19th-century economist of the American School and a chief economic adviser to U.S. President Abraham Lincoln and Secretary of the Treasury Salmon P. Chase during the American Civil War.

Carey's central work is The Harmony of Interests: Agricultural, Manufacturing, and Commercial (1851), which criticizes the system of laissez faire capitalism and free trade expounded by Thomas Malthus and David Ricardo in favor of the American System of developmentalism through the use of tariff protection and state intervention to encourage national self-sufficiency and unity. Carey was also a critic of the practice of slavery from an economic perspective. His work on protective tariffs was largely influential on the early Republican Party and United States trade policy through the start of the 20th century, and his views on banking and monetary policy were adopted by the Lincoln administration in its issuance of paper fiat currency as legal tender.

== Early life ==
Carey was born in Philadelphia, Pennsylvania on December 15, 1793.

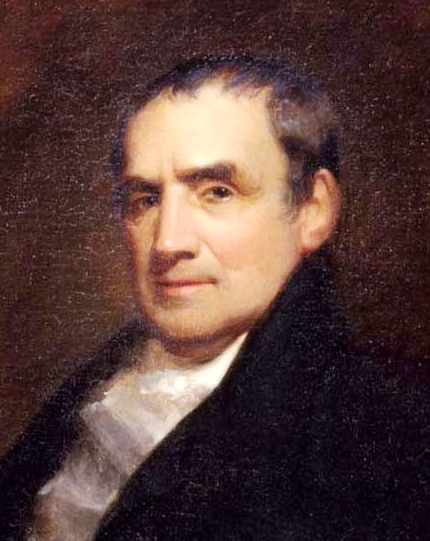
Carey's father, Mathew, was a leading economist in Philadelphia.

His father, Mathew Carey (1760–1839), was a native of Ireland and an influential economist, political reformer, editor, and publisher whose patrons included Benjamin Franklin and the Marquis de Lafayette. He founded a publishing firm, which soon became among the leading firms in Philadelphia and the young United States. Among his many writings was Essays on Political Economy (1822), one of the earliest American treatises favoring Alexander Hamilton's idea of protection and its use in the promotion of American industry.

Carey began working at his father's firm at only twelve years old. (Note: Some sources claim Carey was as young as eight.) At the firm, Carey read most of the books selected for publication, substituting for a formal college education. In 1812, he traveled to Raleigh, North Carolina as part of his business for the firm. He was elevated to partner alongside his father in 1814.

In 1819, he married Martha "Patty" Leslie, the sister of Charles Robert Leslie and Eliza Leslie. They adopted one daughter.

== Publisher ==
On January 1, 1822, Carey, with Isaac Lea (1792–1886)], formed a co-partnership, H. C. Carey & I. Lea. Isaac Lea, on March 8, 1821, in Philadelphia, married one of H.C. Carey's sisters, Frances Anne Carey (1799–1874). On April 10, 1927, when Henry's younger brother, Edward Lawrence Carey (1805–1845), became a partner, the firm's name changed to Carey, Lea & Carey. The firm went on to become the largest publishing house in the United States.

Carey took little formal interest in economics, tacitly accepting the market doctrines of Jean-Baptiste Say and of his Philadelphia associates, Condy Raguet, Nicholas Biddle, and Charles Pettit McIlvaine who were active believers in free trade doctrine.

In 1824, Carey established the common method of trade sales, a medium of exchange between booksellers, which lasted through his life.

== Economist ==
In 1835, Carey read the published 1829–30 lectures of Nassau William Senior titled The Rate of Wages and The Cost of Obtaining Money and published his refutation Essay on the Rate of Wages, with an Examination of the Differences in the Condition of the Laboring Population throughout the World. Carey agreed with Senior's principles and main propositions but criticized Senior's failure to adjust for real wage rates. He remained an advocate of free trade in the essay, writing that "Laissez nous faire is the true doctrine ... it is now so fully understood that the true policy of the United States is freedom of trade and action, that there will be every day less disposition to interfere with it." Nevertheless, his intensely nationalist tone conflicted with economic orthodoxy; Carey identified the purpose of political economy as the promotion of the happiness of nations and the application of national labor for the comfort of workers.

The same year that Essay on the Rate of Wages was published, Carey retired from active business with a fortune and devoted his time to economics and related work. He began work on a text, The Harmony of Nature, which he did not feel adequate for wider publication but which became central to his later thinking. Setting this work aside, he began Principles of Political Economy in 1837, an expansion of his refutation of Senior. He completed the three-volume work in 1840. This work was largely adapted by the French economist Frédéric Bastiat in his own Harmonie Economiques in 1849, with some later accusing Bastiat of plagiarism. The first volume explained Carey's labor theory of value. Its second volume, a comparative study of credit systems in France, Great Britain, and the United States, reads as a defense of the American free banking system, particularly as practiced in New England, in the wake of the Panic of 1837. It was cited favorably by John Stuart Mill in defense of his own arguments for a similar system in Britain. Carey continued to ground his thinking in standard laissez faire doctrine, writing that "Governments have arrogated to themselves the task of regulating the currency, and the natural effect is that nothing is less regular." He would soon thereafter abandon the doctrine.

=== Rejection of free trade ===
Following the Panic of 1837 and the success of the protectionist Tariff of 1842, Carey became an open critic of free trade.

Carey's newfound skepticism was based on his empirical observation of tariff history and his belief that some economic law must exist to explain prosperity under protection and bankruptcy under free trade. By Carey's own account, he initially expected the 1842 tariff would prolong the recession; when it did not, he sought an explanation and became convinced "as with a flash of lightning, that the whole Ricardo-Malthusian system is an error and that with it must fall the system of British free trade." Subsequent scholars have challenged Carey's claim of a sudden change of heart by pointing to his earlier opposition to the English occupations of Ireland and India and his support for Friedrich List and the German Zollverein. He may have also been influenced by his own personal experience; between 1837 and 1840, he invested a portion of his publishing wealth in a paper mill that became completely bankrupt. By the end of 1843, Carey was engaged in a public debate with former Vice President John C. Calhoun, a leading advocate for tariff reduction. In 1845, in a pamphlet entitled Commercial Associations in France and England, Carey began to reject wholesale the "British" economics of Thomas Malthus and David Ricardo altogether and sought to develop a critique of their underlying assumptions. At the same time in England, the Manchester school of liberal capitalism reached the apex of its influence with the repeal of the Corn Laws.

Over the course of ninety days in 1848, Carey expanded on this view by writing Past, Present, and Future, which he said was "designed to demonstrate the existence of a simple and beautiful law of nature, governing man in all his efforts for the maintenance and improvement of his condition ... which, nevertheless, has hitherto remained unnoticed." The work argued in favor of a marriage of industry with capital and the necessity of maintaining domestic markets to promote prosperity; it was met with derision from Manchester school economists. The same year, while living in Burlington, New Jersey, Carey founded The Plough, the Loom, and the Anvil, a periodical journal of economic development, with John Stuart Skinner serving as its publisher. Selections of Carey's writings in the journal were compiled into his next work, The Harmony of Interests.

=== Critique of slavery ===
Carey was a long-time opponent of American slavery, criticizing it as an economic albatross.

In 1853, prompted by the popularity of Uncle Tom's Cabin, Carey wrote and published The Slave Trade, Domestic and Foreign: Why it Exists and How It May Be Extinguished. The tract was partly written as an accusation of hypocrisy against the English. Uncle Tom's Cabin had been particularly popular among abolitionists in England, who cited it to contrast English liberty to American slavery; Carey sought to expose the English system of pauperism and colonialism as an equally severe or worse form of bondage, introducing famine, exile, and pestilence to its subjects in addition to its restraint on liberty. Nevertheless, The Slave Trade is primarily a criticism of the Southern system of chattel slavery on moral and economic grounds.

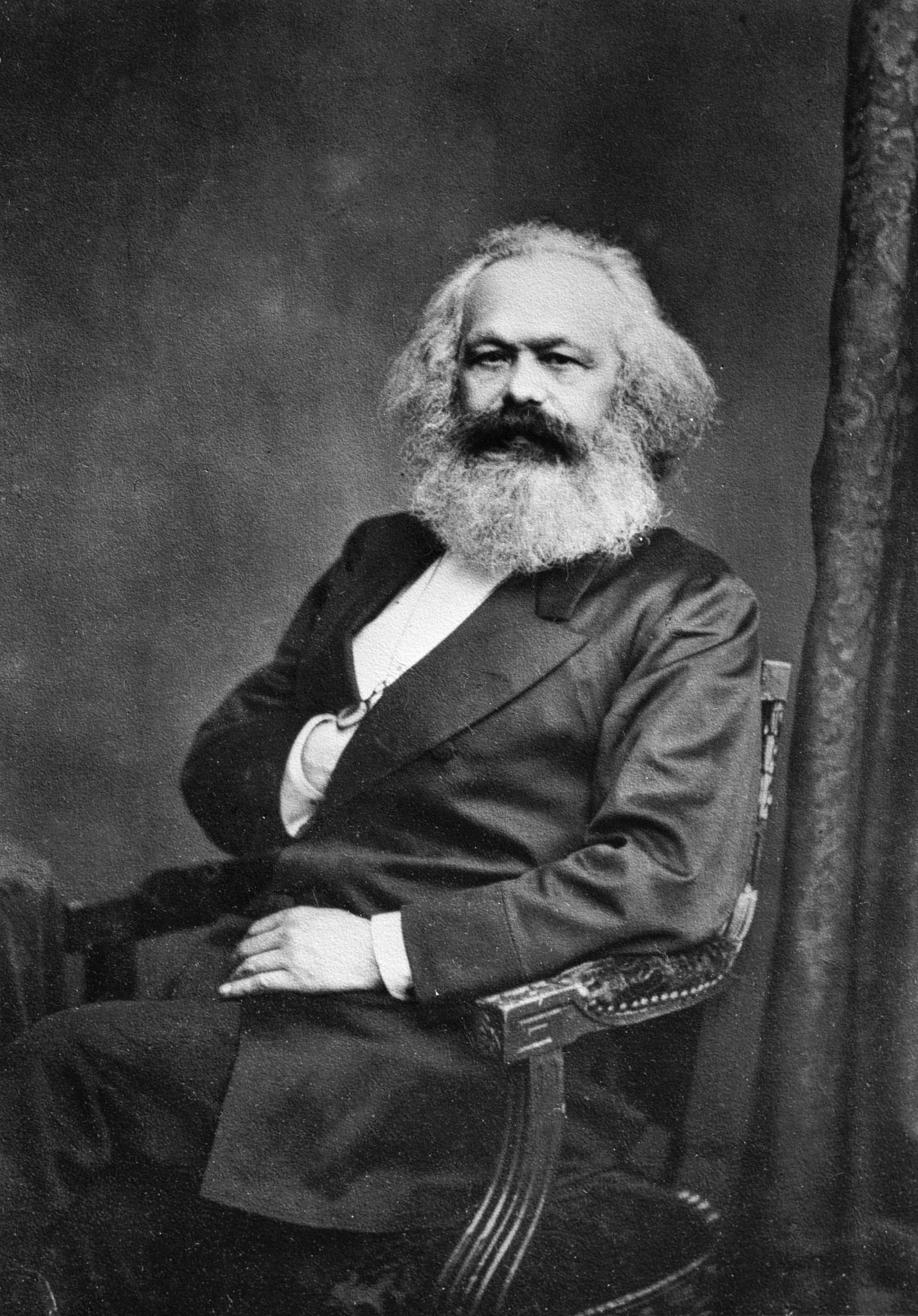
Karl Marx referred to Carey as the "only American economist of importance" and his theories as the chief obstacle to communist revolution in the United States. He pledged to wage "hidden warfare" against Carey.

== New-York Daily Tribune ==
From 1849 to 1857, Carey was a leading editorialist on political economy at Horace Greeley's New-York Daily Tribune.

Beginning in 1852, Karl Marx also served as European correspondent for the Tribune. Marx privately referred to Carey as "the only American economist of importance," but was highly critical of Carey's views as obstructive of communist revolution. Marx believed himself to be engaged in a "hidden warfare" against Carey through his own work for the Tribune. Even after both had left the Tribune, Marx remained a critic of Carey for the remainder of his life. In a 1890 study of Carey's thought, Charles Herbert Levermore suggested that Carey's criticisms of David Ricardo and Thomas Malthus may have been a "prophetic vision of the use that Karl Marx and the socialists would make of [their work]."

While at the Tribune, Carey successfully pressed for an open editorial position in support of the Russian Empire in the Crimean War against Great Britain and France, despite the Russian institution of serfdom. This stance was adopted by much of the Northern press and has been partially credited for influencing Russia's reciprocal support of the Union during the American Civil War and the opposition of Great Britain and France.

Carey left the Tribune in 1857, around the same time Greeley came out in support of a reduction in tariffs. Greeley would later run for president in 1872 on an anti-tariff platform. After leaving the Tribune, Carey took two tours of Europe, where he personally met with John Stuart Mill, Count Cavour, Alexander Humboldt, Justus von Liebig, Michel Chevalier, and other leading men. He maintained correspondence with many of his European acquaintances and hosted them as guests when they visited Philadelphia.

== Influence on Republican Party ==
Carey was hugely influential in shaping the nationalist and protectionist economic policy of the early Republican Party, through his roles as a public intellectual, party operative, and advisor to numerous figures. During the American Civil War, Carey was a trusted adviser to both President Abraham Lincoln and Treasury Secretary Salmon P. Chase. He directly assisted in the drafting of Republican tariff legislation from 1857 through the Civil War, and his thought also influenced President Lincoln's banking and finance policy through the passage of the National Bank Act of 1863 and subsequent Treasury policy.

=== Tariff of 1857 ===
When the Republican Party was founded in popular reaction against the Kansas-Nebraska Act and the extension of slavery, it had no broad economic platform. Attempts to formulate one were met with disapproval, given the possibility they would detract from its anti-slavery mission or divide its supporters. Carey joined the new party in 1856, while still working at the Tribune. He received three votes for vice president at the 1856 Republican National Convention and served as a fundraiser, soliciting Philadelphia manufacturers for donations without assigning his beliefs to the party as a whole. Immediately after the election, which ended in defeat, Charles A. Dana asked Carey for his support in broadening the party's base, "a principle alone not being sufficient." Carey proposed centering the 1860 platform on his system of economic nationalism built around the protective tariff. When Dana declined to "build up a new Protection party," Carey set out on a crusade for a coherent economic policy.

Through personal friendship with Lewis D. Campbell, chairman of the Ways and Means Committee, and James Hepburn Campbell, Carey heavily influenced the committee's report on tariffs, which was a vigorous defense of protection quoting directly from Harmony of Interests. The committee's bill was opposed by some Republicans, including future Treasury Secretary John Sherman and Benjamin Stanton, who criticized it as "essentially a manufacturers' bill ... [which] would not bear the test of scrutiny." The ensuing House debate mostly dealt with slavery; one of the few Representatives to focus on protection was Justin Smith Morrill of Vermont, who would become the leading proponent of Carey's theories during the American Civil War. The tariff rates were reduced in the Democratic Senate, and the compromise bill passed with Republican support, over objections by Morrill and James Campbell.

=== Panic of 1857 and 1860 election ===
After the United States entered another economic recession, Republicans began to take a new interest in economic policy. Revived calls for protective tariffs enhanced Carey's standing. Senator Simon Cameron was elevated as Pennsylvania's candidate for president on a protectionist platform, and David Wilmot agreed to stand for Pennsylvania's other Senate seat on the same platform. Cameron's campaign was premised on a proposition that no candidate could win without Pennsylvania, and no candidate could win Pennsylvania without supporting protection.

As Carey's influence in the party grew, he began to draw connections between slavery and international trade. In a public debate of letters with William Cullen Bryant on the causes of the Panic, its relationship to slavery, and the Republican response, Carey argued that, "In [Pennsylvania and New] Jersey, the tariff is the one and almost the only question." He positioned slavery as one phase of an international economic system. "Slavery," he argued, "must stand or fall with free trade." Protection would bring about abolition through industrialization, an end to the plantation economy and cotton exports, and the establishment of a Southern middle class.

By 1860, Republicans outside of Pennsylvania remained reluctant to embrace protection. In most Western states, the party was divided, and Senator Henry Wilson, who previously pledged New England's support, urged Carey to be cautious. Republicans in the United States House, led by Justin S. Morrill and James H. Campbell, passed a protective tariff at Carey's urging, though it languished in the Senate into winter.

The platform ultimately declared, "while providing revenue for the support of the general government by duties upon imports, sound policy requires such an adjustment as to encourage the development of the industrial interests of the whole country." Biographer George Winston Smith claimed Carey personally drafted the plank through Pennsylvania judge William Jessup, the platform chair, while Gustave Koerner later claimed it was developed at the behest of Horace Greeley to avoid alienating free trade proponents. Regardless, Republicans in Pennsylvania, led by Carey, made protection the central issue of the campaign and carried the state in the fall elections. Though Abraham Lincoln, the Republican President-elect and former Whig, publicly expressed ignorance on tariffs and pledged to "endeavor to comprehend it more fully," Lincoln historian Reinhard H. Luthin claims that by the time of his election, Lincoln had almost certainly read Carey's work on the subject.

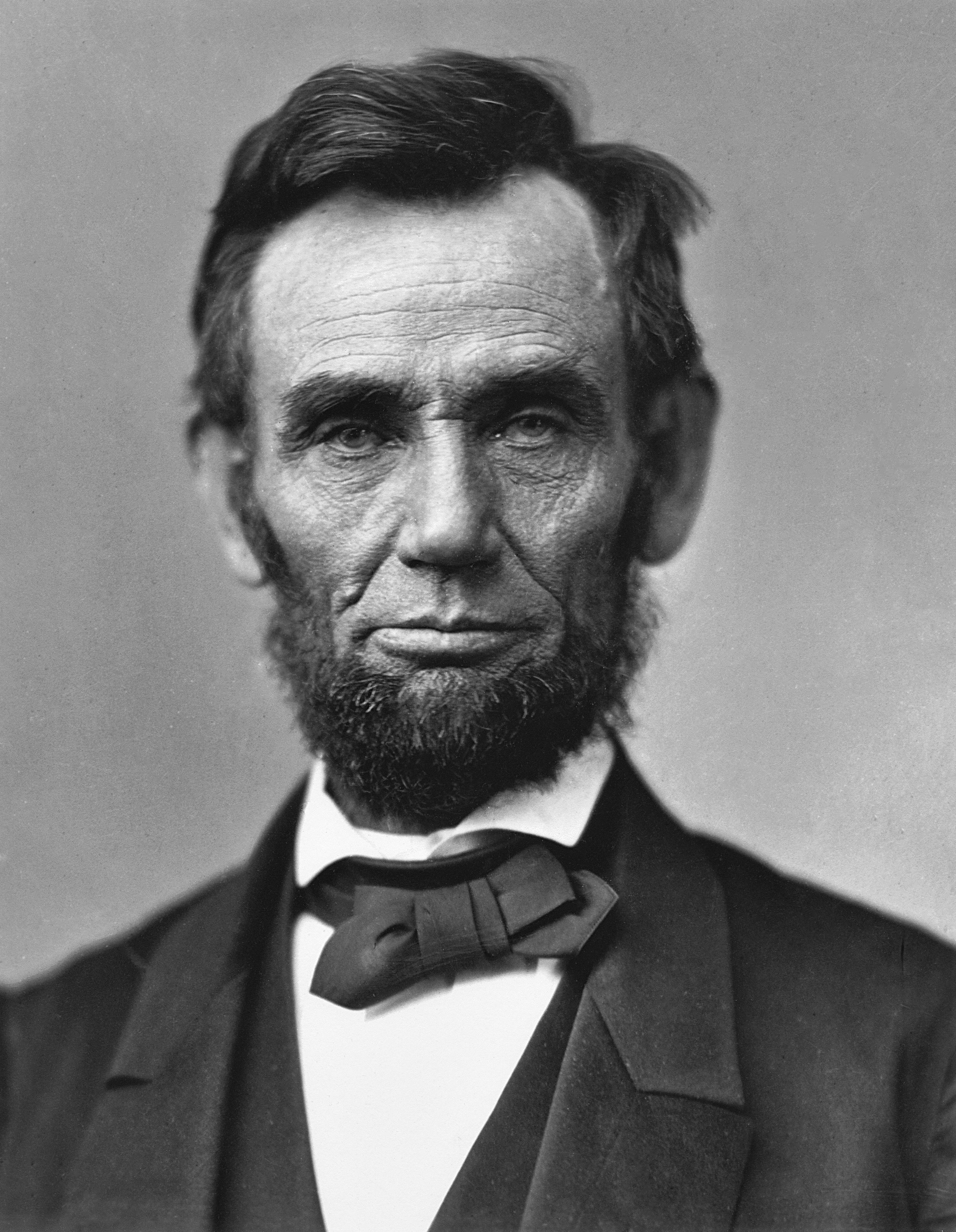
Carey served as a trusted adviser to President Abraham Lincoln, Secretary of the Treasury Salmon P. Chase, and Representative Justin Smith Morrill, among others. His thinking was the basis for the Morrill Tariff and the National Banking Act of 1863.

=== Advisor to Lincoln and Chase ===
After his election, Abraham Lincoln sought Carey's advice on whether he should nominate Simon Cameron for Secretary of the Treasury. Lincoln initially sought Carey out for his expertise on Pennsylvania politics and Cameron's reputation for corruption, which Carey confirmed despite their prior alliance. Lincoln soon began to consult with Carey on tariff policy. At the same time, Carey backed Lincoln's alternative for Treasury, Salmon P. Chase. Though Chase did not respond to Carey's letters and had a background as a supporter of free trade, Carey preferred to persuade Chase than trust Cameron. Via a sustained correspondence through the summer of 1861, Chase and Lincoln consulted Carey on the tariff, domestic taxation, and financial matters generally. By July, Morrill reported to Carey that although "[Chase's] Philosophy is Free trade or ad valorems," he was "willing to yield" on tariff policy amid the growing cost of the American Civil War. "I think Chase, considering his antecedents, should receive generous treatment by all our friends," Morrill wrote. "He is doing the best he can practically." Carey also used his influence to secure key appointments in the Treasury Department for protectionists, including his trusted adviser Dr. William Elder as the lead tariff architect in the administration.

In the winter of 1860–61 amid Southern secession, Morrill and Campbell pressed tariff protection in the lame duck Congress, and Carey personally went to Washington to direct lobbying efforts. John Sherman, now serving as Chair of Ways and Means, was persuaded to the cause. With most free trade advocates leaving Congress as the result of secession, the bill passed with some amendments in the session's final days. George W. Scranton of Pennsylvania also distributed Carey's writings to all members-elect in the incoming Congress; Carey continued to influence tariff policy in Congress throughout the war, and his views remained dominant in the party long after.

=== National Banking Act and greenbacks ===
Carey's theories also influenced the National Banking Act of 1863 and the provision of greenbacks and secured bank notes.

Beginning December 24, 1864 – less than four months before General Robert E. Lee's surrender at Appomattox Court House and the assassination of President Abraham Lincoln – Carey wrote a series of sixteen open letters to Speaker of the House Schuyler Colfax. Published collectively in 1865 as The Way to Outdo England Without Fighting Her, the letters were organized under the headings "The Paper Question" (four letters), "The Iron Question" (four), "The Farmer's Question" (two), "The Railroad Question" (one), and "The Currency Question" (five). Written as the Civil War drew to a close, the letters outlined Carey's vision for the nation's postwar economic development, advocating continued use of the greenback system, protective tariffs, internal improvements, and domestic industrial development to preserve American economic sovereignty and reduce dependence on British capital. Carey also suggested raising the reserve requirements on private banks up to 50%.

After the war, Carey publicly opposed Secretary Hugh McCulloch's proposal to contract the money supply. In a series of public letters, he accused Wall Street banks of artificially inflating the cost of capital and predicted that a swift contraction would lead to chaos, economic paralysis, and political rebellion, particularly among farmers in the West whose mortgage rates would increase. He also opposed the sale of United States bonds overseas, arguing that specie payments could not be resumed until the national debt was held by America creditors, and that payment should be made in silver as well as gold.

== Later work and death ==
In autumn 1872, Carey was a delegate to the convention organized to write a new Pennsylvania Constitution. His commentary during the convention on banking, usury, corporations, and railroads were later published in pamphlet form.

He died at his home in Philadelphia on October 13, 1879.

== Views ==
Carey's views are generally described as nationalist and have been described more particularly as associationist and collectivist for his opposition to economic restraints without distinction between private and state monopoly. Carey argued that ultimately, a causal chain could be drawn through "separation of [men], centralization of the mass, subjection of the many to the powerful few, slavery, stagnation, [and] decrease of real civilization." Instead, the chain should be reversed at its start with "association, complexity of interests, decentralization, [and] harmonious increase of power."

Carey's rejection of orthodox English economic theory was borne of a belief that the state, as the coordinating power in society, must intervene to prevent private advantage from working public mischief. Carey argued for developmentalism, positing that state intervention was necessary to remove "the obstacles to the progress of younger communities created by the action of older and wealthier nations."

Carey's philosophy is condensed and summarized in his work The Principles of Social Science, which frames social science and political economy from the perspective of the economic development of the citizen, that is, one belonging to and responsible to a social community. In his Principles of Social Science, Carey appealed to natural law to argue life must be intentionally oriented toward happiness and peace, and suffering is the result of willful ignorance of natural law. One way in which suffering is brought about is by obscuring the "real" man in favor of the "politico-economical man," a two-dimensional monster who "can be made to work, must be fed, and will procreate." Carey therefore defined social science as "the science of laws which govern man in his efforts to secure for himself the highest individuality and the greatest power of association with his fellow men." Political economy is thus the subset of social science that considers the measures that give these natural laws their fullest effect.

=== Economic nationalism and trade ===
A common theme in Carey's writing is the limits of international economic association and the necessary of national association, and his best-known policy position was his defense of protective tariffs. He was described by an admirer as "rigid, devoted, and uncompromising" on the issue, and as "a Cato hammering on his one theme." Critics accused Carey of Anglophobia for his hostility to the system of free trade under the British Empire and British theories of political economy in general.

Consistent with the law of comparative advantage, Carey argued global centralization required an international division of labor by which each nation developed only those resources in which it possessed a natural advantage. This system placed despotic power in the hands of those controlling the mediums of exchange; the places these middlemen congregated became the global marketplace. Carey argued this theory was the basis for the British policy of imperialism and free trade, by which the Empire intended to establish a global monopoly on both manufacturing and shipping centered on London, while other nations were resigned to exporting raw materials. To check centralization, Carey thus emphasized the need for human association; in Carey's writing, the natural form of association was the nation, an association of citizens. He suggested that the United States and other nations should interpose protective tariffs between themselves and London, increasing the cost of their raw materials, fostering domestic manufacturing, and depriving British manufacturers of a monopoly on finished goods. This would enable the establishment of a middle class, the abolition of chattel slavery, and the encouragement of patriotic feeling.

Carey emphasized that the final result of industrialization would be the establishment of "perfect free trade" between developed nations, whose range of production would be limited only by absolute natural barriers. His utopian vision was laid out in writing:

"Of the advantage of perfect free trade there can be no doubt. What is good between the states ought to be good the world over. But free trade can be successfully administered only after an apprenticeship of protection. Strictly speaking, taxation should all be direct. Tariff for revenue should not exist. Interference with trade is excusable only on ground of self-protection. A disturbing force of prodigious power pre- vents the loom and spindle from taking and keeping their proper places by the plow and harrow. When the protective regime has counteracted the elements of foreign opposition, obstacles to free trade will disappear and the tariff will pass out of existence. Wars will cease; for no chief magistrate will dare to recommend an increase of direct taxation."

Carey further contrasted this theory of "perfect" free trade to the English system in a letter to Henry Wilson: "Free trade, as ultimated in England, is the most debased ignorance, the most abhorrent cruelty, the most disgusting vice and the most heart-breaking misery that can be seen in any country calling itself civilized and Christian." Despite this stated utopian view, Carey never backed down from his support for high tariffs within his lifetime, believing that the United States had not reached complete economic development.

In addition to his long advocacy for protectionism to obstruct international trade, Carey also opposed the institution of an international copyright law, which he argued would dissolve national boundaries and lead to the formation of publishing monopolies. This would in turn lead to a decline in the quality of literary writing, as the best authors did not write for wide audiences and would derive no benefit from a global market.

=== Monetary and banking theory ===
As a corollary to his system of protection, Carey developed a theory of monetary sovereignty built on fiat currency. Carey's monetary views were the basis for the National Banking Act of 1863 and issuance of greenbacks and later popularly associated with the Greenback Party.

He criticized the view of David Hume, Adam Smith, and John Stuart Mill that currency served only as a symbol of wealth and was the least productive part of a nation's capital. Instead, he argued nations should increase monetary reserves by any means; credit money was useful and necessary to the establishment of stable prices and credit growth. National sovereignty would be preserved through a domestic, non-exportable currency to inure domestic markets against fluctuations in the value of precious metals, while the gold dollar should serve as the unit of international exchange. Carey opposed monetary contraction, arguing that increasing business development demanded an increasing currency supply. He accused the financial industry of artificially inflating interest rates and predicted that contraction would lead to political and economic chaos. He was also an early advocate of bimetallism and the remonetization of silver in order to secure a stable national currency, fearing that gold reserves in the United States were too small. His views on these issues were later incorporate in the platform of the Greenback Party, with which he was popularly associated, and the populist movement.

In the realm of private banking, Carey was a lifelong advocate of free banking and believed banks were essential as springs of local business life; he discouraged the general attacks on private banking institutions made by some other "green-backers."

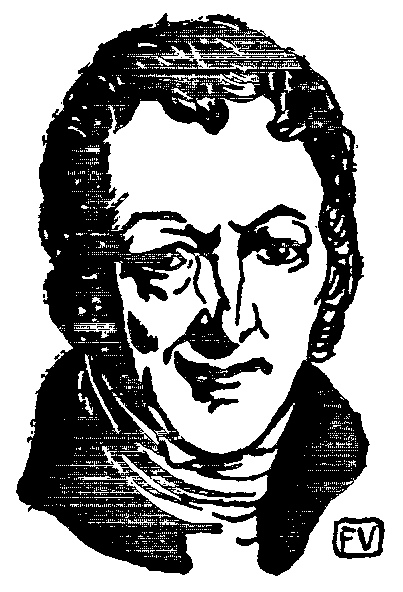
Carey was sharply critical of British economist Thomas Malthus, who argued that growth was inherently limited and excessive population led to suffering.

=== Criticism of Ricardo and Malthus ===
In Principles of Social Science, Carey delivers a lengthy rebuke of David Ricardo and Thomas Malthus. He sharply distinguishes value, "man's power to command the always gratuitous services of nature," from utility, the measure of man's power over nature. Value is limited by reproduction and declines with the increase of combination among men, while utility grows with the extension of human association. Because value is constantly decreasing, Carey posits the power and wealth of the laborer will tend to increase both absolutely and relative to that of capital as population and association increase; he calls this "the most beautiful of all the laws recorded in the book of science. As rents continually diminish, the farmer or laborer finds it easier to make his living. Further, Carey believed that the history of human civilization demonstrated that human progress was from poorer to richer soils, while Ricardo's law of comparative advantage is dependent on the opposite assumption. Charles Herbert Levermore compares Carey's reasoning to that of Pierre Paul Leroy-Beaulieu a half century later.

Malthus, Carey says, "teaches that a monopoly of the land is in accordance with a law of nature. Admiring morality, he promotes profligacy by encouraging celibacy ... Desirous to uplift the people, he tells the landowner and the laborer that the loss of the one is the gain of the other. His book is the true manual of the demagogue, seeking power by means of agrarianism, war and plunder." Carey also criticizes Malthus for failing to prove his ratios of production and consumption, given variation in the growth cycle of plants and the diets of humans over time, (Note: Levermore posits that Carey, in arguing for a subsistence diet, consciously elevated vegetarianism and the work of Sylvester Graham.) and for contradicting the Christian belief of the goodness of God, who would be malicious to create a world which could not sustain the proliferation of humanity. Carey also cites Herbert Spencer to argue "the degree of fertility varies inversely [against the development of] the nervous system," which suggests that resource scarcity is a greater restraint in less developed societies and population is self-regulative.

== Legacy ==
Upon his death, Carey's library was donated to the University of Pennsylvania.

Carey's economic theories not only impacted Western and American economic thought but also resonated with intellectuals in other parts of the world. For instance, Gebrehiwot Baykedagn, an Ethiopian economist and reformer, was influenced by Carey's principles. Baykedagn applied Carey's ideas on protectionism and national economic self-sufficiency to the context of Ethiopia, advocating for policies that would modernize and strengthen the country's economy.

A portrait of Carey painted by his brother-in-law Charles Robert Leslie is housed by the Pennsylvania Academy of the Fine Arts.

Carey elected to prestigious societies during his lifetime:

- Elected a member of the American Philosophical Society in 1833
- Elected an Associate Fellow of the American Academy of Arts and Sciences in 1863
- Elected a foreign member of the Royal Swedish Academy of Sciences in 1868

== Publications ==
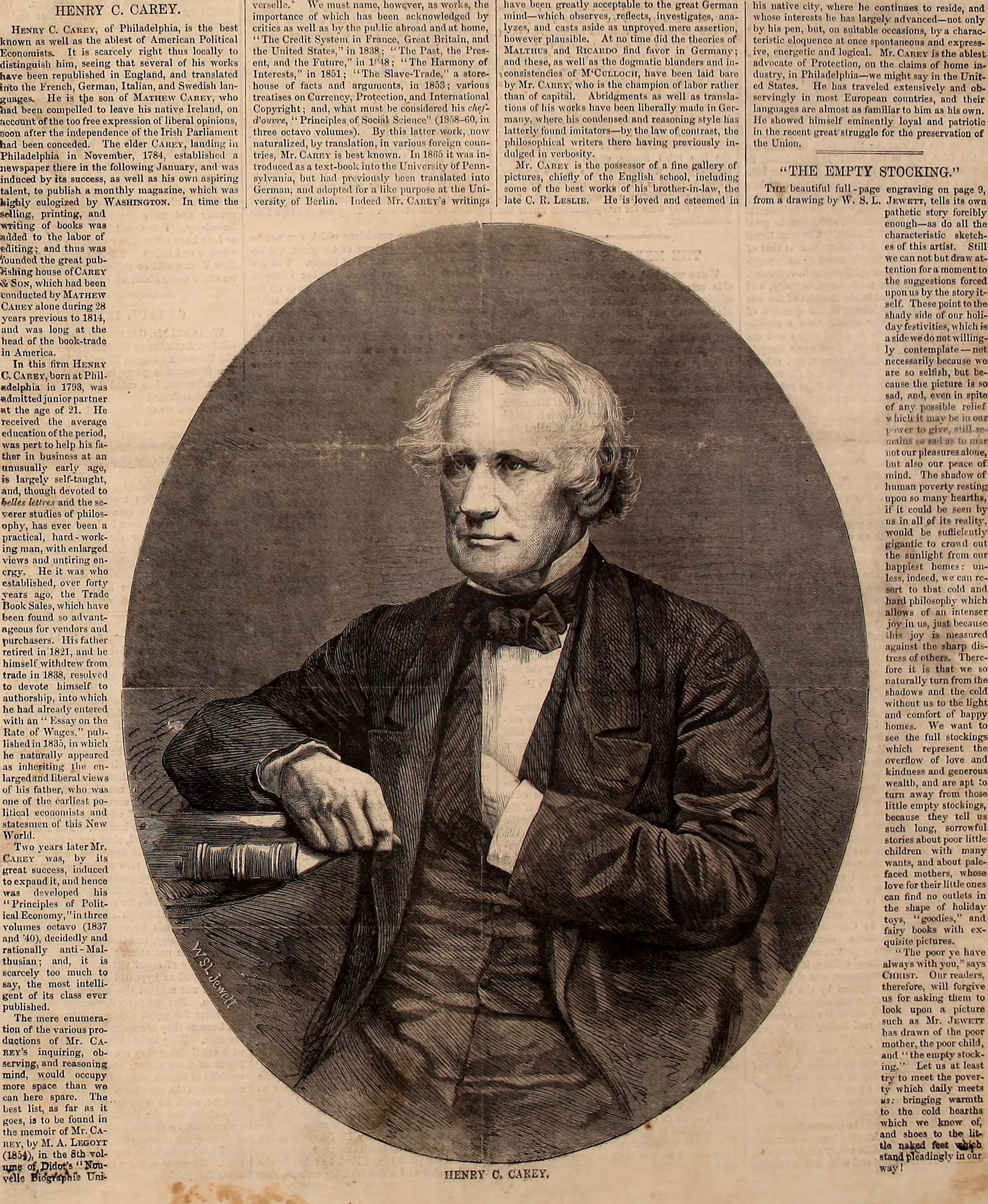
An 1857 Harper's Weekly column describes Carey as "the best known as well as the ablest of American Political Economists."

Within his lifetime, Carey's works were translated into English, French, German, Italian, Swedish, Russian, Hungarian, Japanese, and Portuguese. His works have been compared to those of Friedrich List and Stephen Colwell, a close friend also of Philadelphia.

Carey's publications included:

=== Books ===
- Essay on the Rate of Wages, Philadelphia, 1835.
- Harmony of Nature (unpublished), Philadelphia, 1836
- Principles of Political Economy, Philadelphia, 1837–40 (3 volumes).
  - Vol II: The Credit System in France, Great Britain and the United States , London, 1838.
- The Past, the Present and the Future , Philadelphia, 1848.
- The Harmony of Interests: Agricultural, Manufacturing and Commercial, New York, 1851.
- The Slave Trade, Domestic and Foreign: Why It Exists & How It May Be Extinguished, Philadelphia, 1853.
- Principles of Social Science, Philadelphia, 1858–60 (3 volumes).
- Manual of Social Science (ed. McKean), 1864.
- The Unity of Law as Exhibited in the Relations of Physical, Social, Mental and Moral Science, Philadelphia, 1873.

=== Essays and pamphlets ===
Carey wrote an estimated three thousand pages of pamphlets and articles for the New York Tribune; The Plough, the Loom, and the Anvil; the Philadelphia North American, and other publications. Below is a selection of his work.

- What Constitutes Currency? What are the Causes of Unsteadiness in the Currency? and What is the Remedy?, 1840.
- Commercial Associations of France and England, 1845.
- What Constitutes Real Freedom of Trade?, American Whig Review 6, no. 2, 1850.
- What the North Desires, —.
- Two Diseases Raging in the Union: Anti-Slavery and Pro-Slavery, —.
- The Prospect, Agricultural Manufacturing, Commercial, and Financial at the Opening of the Year, 1851.
- How to Increase Competition for the Purchase of Labor and How to Raise the Wages of Labor, 1852.
- Two Letters to a Cotton Planter, —.
- Ireland's Miseries and their Cause, —.
- The Working of British Free Trade, —.
- British Free Trade in Ireland, —.
- Letter to a Farmer of Ohio, —.
- Three Letters to Hon. R. M. T. Hunter, —.
- The Present Commercial Policy of the County, —.
- Letters on International Copyright, Philadelphia, 1853, (2nd ed. 1868).
- The North and the South, New York, Ann Arbor, Office of the Tribune, 1854.
- Coal: Its Producers and Consumers, —.
- American Labor Versus British Free Trade, Philadelphia, 1855.
- The True Policy of the South, –.
- Present Situation and Future Prospects of American Railroads, –.
- Money: A Lecture Delivered before the New York Geographical and Statistical Society, Philadelphia, 1856, (2nd ed. 1860).
- The French and American Tariffs Compared, 1861.
- Contraction or Expansion? Repudiation or Resumption?, Philadelphia, 1866.
- Resources of the Union: A Lecture Before the American Geographical and Statistical Society, 1866.
- The National Bank Amendment Bill, –.
- The Public Debt, Local and National, Philadelphia, –.
- Review of the Decade 1857–67, Philadelphia, —.
- The Finance Minister, the Currency, and the Public Debt, 1868.
- Resumption: How It May Be Profitably Brought About, 1869.
- How protection, increase of public and private revenues, and national independence, march hand in hand together, Philadelphia, 1869.
- Review of the Farmer's Question, 1870.
- Wealth: Of What Does it Consist?, —.
- A Memoir of Stephen Colwell: Read before the American Philosophical Society, Philadelphia, 1871.
- The International Copyright Question Considered, 1872.
- The Rate of Interest and its Influence on the Relations of Capital and Labor, 1873. (speech to the Pennsylvania Constitutional Convention).
- Capital and Labor, 1874. (Report of the Committee on Industrial Interests and Labor in the Pennsylvania Constitutional Convention).
- The British Treaties of 1871 and 1874, —.
- The Senate Finance Bill, 1875.
- Manufactures: At Once an Evidence and a Measure of Civilization, —.
- To the Friends of the Union Throughout the Union, 1876.
- Appreciation of the Price of Gold: Evidence Before the U.S. Monetary Commission, —.
- The Three Most Prosperous Countries in the World, 1877.
- Resumption: When and How will it End?, —.
- Repudiation: Past, Present, and Future, 1879.

=== Published correspondence ===
A number of Carey's publications were selected from his private correspondence with Republican politicians or public polemic letters written for dissemination.

- Letters to the President on the Foreign and Domestic Policy of the Union and Its Effects, as Exhibited in the Condition of the People and the State, Philadelphia, 1858. (letters to James Buchanan).
- Financial Crisis: Their Causes and Effects, Philadelphia, 1860. (letters to William C. Bryant).
- The Way to Outdo England Without Fighting Her – Letters to the Hon. Schuyler Colfax, Speaker of the House of Representatives, on the Paper, the Iron, the Farmer's, the Railroad, and the Currency Questions. Philadelphia: Henry Carey Baird & Co. (publisher). Philadelphia: Collins (printer) → Tillinghast King Collins (1802–1870). 1865. OCLC 68768927 (all editions).
- Reconstruction: Industrial, Financial, and Political, Washington, 1867. (letters to Henry Wilson).
- Shall We Have Peace? Peace Financial, and Peace Political?, Philadelphia, 1869. (letters to Ulysses S. Grant).
- Currency Inflation: How it Has Been Produced and How it May Be Profitably Reduced, 1874, (letters to Benjamin Bristow).
- Monetary Independence, 1875. (letter to Moses W. Field).
- Commerce, Christianity, and Civilization, versus British free trade : letters in reply to the London times, Philadelphia, 1876.

== Bibliography ==
=== References ===
- APS (American Philosophical Society) (1833). "Member History" (1833): "Henry C. Carey". (APS official website)
- Carey, Henry C[harles] (1865). The Way to Outdo England Without Fighting Her – Letters to the Hon. Schuyler Colfax, Speaker of the House of Representatives, on the Paper, the Iron, the Farmer's, the Railroad, and the Currency Questions (collection of advocacy letters on national economic policy). Philadelphia: Henry Carey Baird & Co. (publisher). Philadelphia: Collins (printer) → Tillinghast King Collins (1802–1870). OCLC 68768927 (all editions).

See Schuyler Colfax (1823–1885)

1. Via Wikimedia (Michigan; pages 164–165 missing).
2. Via HathiTrust (Harvard).
3. Via Internet Archive (Michigan; pages 164–165 missing).
4. Via Google Books (British Museum). Philadelphia.

16 letters.

"The Paper Question" (Letters 1–4).

"The Paper Question."

1. "Letter First". December 24, 1864. pp. 3–12.
2. "Letter Second". December 26, 1864. pp. 13–21.
3. "Letter Third". December 29, 1864. pp. 22–30.
4. "Letter Fourth". January 2, 1865. pp. 31–41.

In "The Paper Question," Carey argues that encouraging domestic paper manufacture through protective tariffs would strengthen American industry, lower production costs over time, and reduce dependence on foreign imports. In the nineteenth century, paper served as the principal medium of commerce, government, education, publishing, and public discourse. As an advocate of the American System, Carey opposed the reduced duties of the Tariff of 1857, which he believed contributed to the Panic of 1857. Carey subsequently advised Congressman Justin S. Morrill (1861), sponsor of the Morrill Tariff, contending that protective tariffs promoted domestic manufacturing, employment, and long-term national economic development. [See Protectionism §§ Civil War (1861–1865) and Restriction period (1866–1928)]

"The Iron Question" (Letters 5–8).

"The Iron Question."

5. "Letter Fifth". January 6, 1865. pp. 42–51.
6. "Letter Sixth". January 9, 1865. pp. 52–59.
7. "Letter Seventh". January 11, 1865. pp. 60–68.
8. "Letter Eighth". January 16, 1865. pp. 69–85.

In "The Iron Question," Carey argues that a strong domestic iron industry was indispensable to national prosperity, asking whether the United States should manufacture its own iron under protective tariffs or remain dependent upon British imports.

"The Farmer Question" (Letters 9–10).

"The Farmer's Question."

9. "Letter Ninth". January 20, 1865. pp. 86–95.
10. "Letter Tenth". January 30, 1865. pp. 96–109.

In "The Farmer's Question," Carey argues that American agriculture prospers when supported by nearby manufacturing, improved transportation, and domestic markets rather than dependence upon distant export markets.

"The Railroad Question" (Letter11).

"The Railroad Question."

11. "Letter Eleventh". February 10, 1865. pp. 110–125.

In "The Railroad Question," Carey asks whether the nation's expanding railroad system should serve productive industry and agriculture or be subordinated to financial speculation and monopoly.

"The Currency Question" (Letters 12–16).

"The Currency Question."

12. "Letter Twelfth". February 13, 1865. pp. 126–132.
13. "Letter Thirteenth". February 13, 1865. pp. 133–141.
14. "Letter Fourteenth". February 15, 1865. pp. 142–150.
15. "Letter Fifteenth". February 17, 1865. pp. 151–158.
16. "Letter Sixteenth". February 18, 1865. pp. 159–165.

Carey frames "The Currency Question" by urging the United States to maintain and, if necessary, expand its greenback currency rather than contract (reduce) the money supply in preparation for a return to specie payments (the redemption of paper currency in gold or silver coin). He argued that an abundant currency promoted industry, employment, and national independence, whereas monetary contraction—reducing the quantity of greenbacks in circulation to facilitate specie resumption—would depress economic activity. During Carey's lifetime, the United States had no central bank; monetary policy was established through federal legislation and implemented by the Treasury under the Independent Treasury system. (See Economic history of the United States § Financial issues of reconstruction)
"Letter Sixteenth" (the concluding letter in the series) summarizes Carey's argument defending the U.S. greenback system, arguing that a flexible, domestically controlled currency is essential for economic independence and agricultural prosperity.

- EB 1911 (Encyclopædia Britannica) (1910–1911). "Carey, Henry Charles" . In Chisholm, Hugh (1866–1924) (ed.). Encyclopædia Britannica (29 Vols.). A Dictionary of Arts, Sciences, Literature and General Information. Vol. 5: "Calhoun to Chatelaine" (11th ed.). Cambridge: University Press → Original publisher: Horace Everett Hooper. p. 329 – via Wikisource. LCCN 11-27773; OCLC 266598 (all editions).
1. Via Internet Archive (James J. Hill Center, Saint Paul, Minnesota).
2. Via Google Books (Indiana University).
- Elder, William (1806–1885) (1880). A Memoir of Henry C. Carey. Philadelphia: Printed by Allen, Lane & Scott → co-partnership founded May 22, 1872 by Edmund W. Allen (1820–1916), Cornelius Ambrose Lane (1847–1913), and William Henry Scott (1847–1920) – all formerly of the Leisenring Printing House (Henry G. Leisenring) – historically known as H.G. Leisenring's Steam Power Printing House. Leisenring Printing House burned down May 19, 1872. Scott's son, Garfield Scott (1881–1955) ran the firm in various capacities. LCCN 15-9622; LCCN 15-7673; OCLC 8348196.
1. Via Wikimedia (Library of Congress). Philadelphia: American Iron and Steel Association.
2. Via Internet Archive (Michigan). Philadelphia: Henry Carey Baird & Co.
3. Via Google Books (Harvard). Philadelphia: American Iron and Steel Association.
- "Associate Fellows" "Henry Charles Carey". Proceedings of the American Academy of Arts and Sciences. 17: 417. June 1881 – June 1882. JSTOR 25138664.
- Ingram, John Kells (1823–1907) (1902) [1887]. A History of Political Economy. Preface by Edmund Janes James, PhD (1855–1925) (2nd ed.). New York: The MacMillan Company (publisher). New York: J.J. Little & Co. (printer). Digitized copies at UPenn's Online Books. LCCN 04-10424 (1888 ed.); LCCN 11-34135 (1897 ed.), LCCN 09-21857 (2nd ed.; 1907); OCLC 3694057 (all editions).
1. Via Internet Archive (UCLA). p. 175.
- Lea, James Henry (1846–1914) [at Wikidata]; Lea, George Henry (1853–1915) (1906). "American Section" → "Fifth Generation": "Isaac Lea": "Frances Anne". The Ancestry and Posterity of John Lea of Christian Malford, Wiltshire, England, and of Pennsylvania in America (George Henry Lee was a grandson of Isaac Lea). Philadelphia: Lea Brothers & Co. p. 96 – via Internet Archive (Library of Congress). LCCN 06-2088.
- Lee, Arthur Mathias, PhD (1918–2000) (July 1957). "Henry C. Carey and the Republican Tariff". Pennsylvania Magazine of History and Biography. 81 (3): 280–302. JSTOR 20088986; ISSN 0031-4587 (journal); OCLC 9969836447 (article).
1. Via Internet Archive.
2. Via Penn State University.
- Levermore, Charles Herbert (1856–1927) (December 1890). "Henry C. Carey and his Social System". Political Science Quarterly. 5 (4): 553–582. ISSN 0032-3195 (journal); JSTOR 2139529; doi:10.2307/2139529; OCLC 80046785, 5545332297.
1. Via JSTOR (PDF).
2. Via Internet Archive (JSTOR).
- Luthin, Reinhard Henry (1905–1962) (July 1944). "Abraham Lincoln and the Tariff". The American Historical Review. 49 (4). Oxford University Press: 609–629. doi:10.1086/ahr/49.4.609. ISSN 0002-8762 (journal); doi:10.2307/1850218 and 10.1086/ahr/49.4.609 (article); S2CID 159899340; JSTOR 1850218; OCLC 12207481, 5545167401 (article).
1. Via Internet Archive (Unz Archive).
- Marx, Karl (1818–1883); Engels, Friedrich (1820–1895) (1975) [1st printing, 1955; 2nd ed., revised and supplemented, 1965; 3rd revised ed., 1975; 4th printing, 1982]. "Notes". In Ryazanskaya, Salomeya Wolfovna (ed.). Karl Marx and Frederick Engels – Selected Correspondence. Translated by I. B. Lasker (3rd ed.). Moscow: Progress Publishers. p. 473.
1. Via Marxist Internet Archive (PDF) (3rd ed.). 1975.
2. Via Internet Archive (4th ed.). 1982.
"Carey's views were criticized by Marx in a number of letters (see for instance pp. 67–70, 225–228 of this volume) as well as in Das Kapital [Capital] (in German). Hamburg. 1867 Otto Meissner, (1819–1902), publisher → Otto Carl Meissner [Wikidata] (1819–1902). See Das Kapital and Theories of Surplus-Value."
- National Gazette and Literary Register (The). (triweekly). Philadelphia. LCCN sv97-20654 (microfilm ed.), LCCN sn94-87689 (microfilm ed.), LCCN sn91-25744 (microfilm ed.), LCCN sn83-45322, LCCN sn84-26333; OCLC 32416893 (all editions).
1. "The Subscribers [H. C. Carey & I. Lea]" (notice of founding of co-partnership notice). Vol. 2, no. 362. January 1, 1822. p. 3 (column 2, middle).
2. "Copartnership [Carey, Lea & Carey" (notice of renaming of co-partnership, effective April 10, 1827). Vol. 7, whole no. 1972. April 12, 1827. p. 3 (column 6, bottom).
- New-York Times (The). LCCN sn78-4456, LCCN sn00-61556; ISSN 0362-4331, ISSN 1553-8095 (online); OCLC 1645522 (all editions).
1. "Obituary – Henry Charles Carey". Vol. 29, whole no. 8765. October 14, 1879. p. 5 (column 4, top). Retrieved June 6, 2026.
  1. NYTimes Archives → Blog.
  2. TimesMachine → Pdf (PDF); Permalink.
  3. Via Internet Archive (SIM Box ID IA41661324, Canister no. 21). IA Collection: SIM (Serials in Microfilm); Periodicals; Pub New York Times (limited preview only).
- Portrait: Henry C. Carey (medium: oil on wood). By Charles Robert Leslie (1794–1859), artist. Philadelphia: Henry C. Carey Collection at the Pennsylvania Academy of the Fine Arts. c. 1826.
- Koerner, Gustav Philipp (1809–1896) (1909). McCormac, Thomas Joseph (1865–1932) (ed.). Memoirs of Gustave Koerner – Life-Sketches Written at the Suggestion of His Children. Vol. II. Cedar Rapids: The Torch Press. p. 86 – via Internet Archive (Cal Berkeley, Richmond Field Station).
See Gebrehiwot Baykedagn (1886–1919).
- Smith, George Winston, PhD (1911–1976) (1951). Henry C. Carey and American Sectional Conflict. Albuquerque: University of New Mexico Press. LCCN 51-62438; OCLC 1801505 (all editions).
1. Via HathiTrust (Michigan).
