= Martin Hans Boyè =

Danish-American chemist (1812–1907)

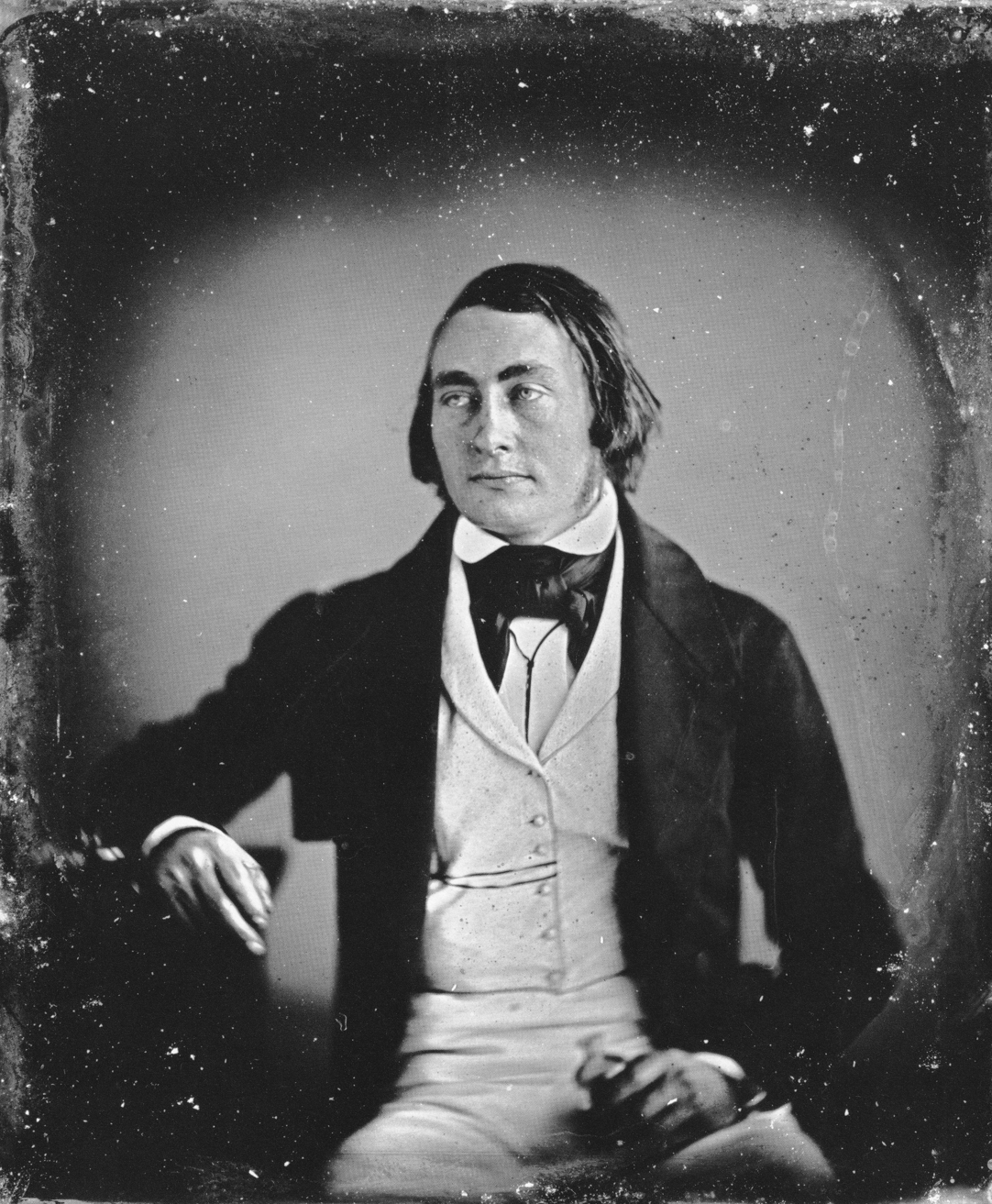
- Boyè photographed by Robert Cornelius, May 19, 1842
- Born: December 6, 1812; Copenhagen, Denmark.
- Died: March 6, 1907 (aged 94)
- Occupation: Chemist

Martin Hans Boyè (6 December 1812 – 6 March 1907) was a Danish-American chemist.

== Biography ==
Boyè was born in Copenhagen, Denmark on 6 December 1812, son of a chemist in charge of the works of the Royal Porcelain Manufactury. He attended the Copenhagen University and then the Polytechnic School, where he was taught by Johan Georg Forchhammer, graduating with honors in 1835. At the age of 24, in 1836, Boyè emigrated to New York, and in 1837 moved to Philadelphia where he became a student of Robert Hare. In 1838 he was employed as a geologist in the New Jersey geological survey under Henry Darwin Rogers.

In 1839 the Journal of the Franklin Institute published an analysis of a specimen of iron ore from "Iron Mountain", Missouri by Rogers and Boye. In 1840, the same journal published a paper by Robert E. and Martin Boye on the determination of the presence of calcium using sulphuric acid. That same year, the American Journal of Science contained a note about a new compound of platinum discovered by Rogers and his friend Boyè. Boyè continued his studies of chemistry in the laboratory of James Curtis Booth. He received an MD degree in 1844 from the University of Pennsylvania, with a graduate thesis on "the Structure of the Nervous System". He continued to assist Booth until 1845.

In 1847, Boyè invented a method of refining cottonseed oil, and later he entered into large-scale production of this oil for cooking and as an ingredient in toilet soap. His research included development of perchloric ether used as a smokeless gunpowder, analysis of feldspar, a treatise on the composition of water in the Schuylkill River, an analysis of concretion from a horse's stomach, analysis of Chinese artificially colored tea, and an investigation of the Aurora Borealis. Boyè was Chair of Chemistry in Central High, Philadelphia, from 1851 to 1859, when he resigned due to poor health. He was a member of the American Philosophical Society and the American Association of Geologists.

== Bibliography ==
Selected works:

- Henry Darwin Rogers; Martin Hans Boyè (1841). "Upon a new compound of the deuto-chloride of platinum, nitric oxide, and chloro-hydric acid". Transactions of the American Philosophical Society. 7 (Part 6).
- Jöns Jakob Berzelius (friherre); Martin Hans Boye; F. Leaming (1843). The kidneys and urine. Lea & Blanchard.
- Clark Hare; Martin Hans Boyè (1843). "On the perchlorate of the oxide of ethule or perchloric ether". Transactions of the American Philosophical Society. doi:10.1080/14786444108650439. "... a concentrated solution of perchlorate and sulphovinate of barytes, in equivalent proportions, was subjected to distillation. The sulphovinate of barytes may be considered as a double sulphate of barytes and the oxide of aethule; and we anticipated that, when heat was applied, a double decomposition would tak e place between the latter and the perchlorate of barytes. So long as the salts remained in solution no reaction occurred; but as soon as they became solid, in consequence of the distillation of the water, a reciprocal decomposition ensued, and a sweet aethereal liquid distilled into the receiver. This liquid is the perchlorate of the oxide of ethule."
- James Curtis Booth; Martin Hans Boyè (1846). "On the conversion of benzoïc into hippuric acid". Transactions of the American Philosophical Society.
- Martin Hans Boye (1856). A treatise on pneumatics: being the physics of gases : including vapors... E.C. & J. Biddle.
