= Campbell Morfit =

American chemist

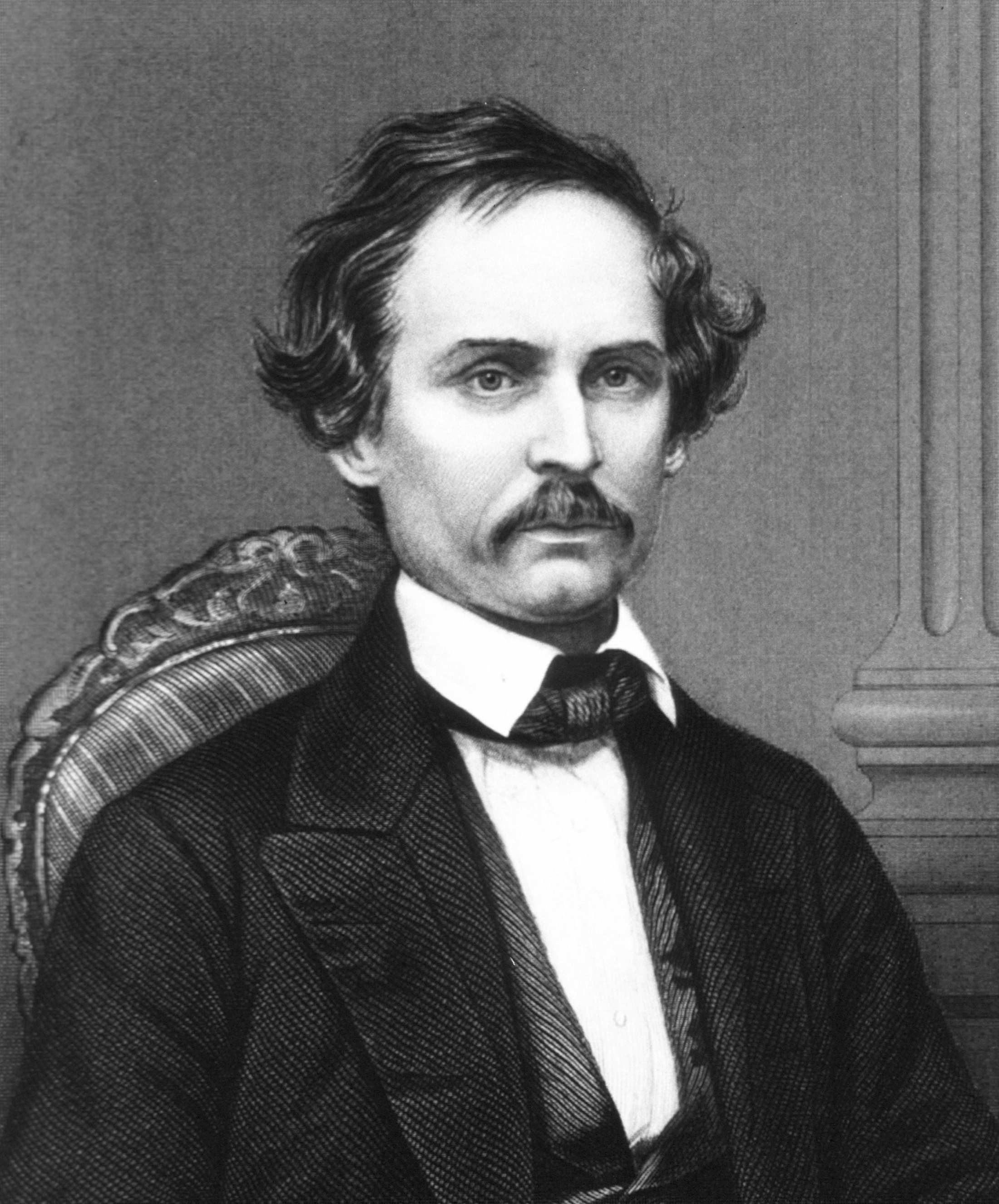
Campbell Morfit while a professor of chemistry in New York City

Campbell Morfit (19 November 1820 – 8 December 1897) was a distinguished chemist from the United States, co-editor with James Curtis Booth of the Encyclopedia of Chemistry (1850).

== Life ==
Morfit was born in Herculaneum, Missouri, on 19 November 1820 and was educated at the Columbian University in Georgetown (Washington, D.C.). Before graduating, he began to study chemistry in the laboratory of James C. Booth in Philadelphia. He assisted Booth in development of a new method of refining gold, and in 1850 was assigned a share of the patent rights. In 1853 he established a laboratory at Pikesville Arsenal in Maryland, where he investigated gun metal, co-authoring a report with James Booth on the subject for the United States Ordnance department. He was the first teacher at the chemical department of the Maryland Institute, and from 1854 to 1858 was professor of applied chemistry there. He then moved to New York City, where he continued to practice chemistry until emigrating to London in 1861.

Morfit was a fellow of the Chemical Society of London and the Institute of Chemistry. His principal works were Applied Chemistry in the Manufacture of Soaps and Candles (1847); Chemical and Pharmaceutical Manipulations (1848); A Report of the Progress of the Chemical Arts, prepared with Booth for the Smithsonian institution (1851); Perfumery, its Manufacture and Use (1852–1855); Oleic Soaps (1871); and Mineral Phosphates (1873). He and James Booth were co-editors of the Encyclopedia of Chemistry, and he wrote many other books and articles. Morfit died in London on 8 December 1897.

== Bibliography ==
- Campbell Morfit (1847). Chemistry applied to the manufacture of soap and candles: A thorough exposition of the principles and practice of the trade, in all their minutiæ, based upon the most recent discoveries in science and improvements in art. Carey and Hart.
- Campbell Morfit; Elisabeth Celnart (1847). Perfumery: its manufacture and use ... Carey and Hart.
- Campbell Morfit (1848). Manures, their composition, preparation, and action upon soils: with the quantities to be applied. Being a field companion for the farmer. From the French of standard authorities. Lindsay and Blakiston.
- Campbell Morfit, Alexander Mucklé (1849). Chemical and pharmaceutic manipulations: a manual of the mechanical and chemico-mechanical operations of the laboratory ... For the use of chemists, druggists, teachers and students. Lindsay and Blakiston, 1849. ISBN 978-0-608-41028-9.
- James Curtis Booth; Campbell Morfit (1850). The encyclopedia of chemistry, practical and theoretical: embracing its application to the arts, metallurgy, mineralogy, geology, medicine, and pharmacy. H.C. Baird.
- James Curtis Booth; Campbell Morfit (1851). On recent improvements in the chemical arts. Smithsonian Inst.
- Julia de Fontenelle (Jean-Sébastien-Eugène, M.), François Malepeyre (1852). Campbell Morfit (ed.). The arts of tanning, currying, and leather dressing;: theoretically and practically considered in all their details. Henry Carey Baird, No. 7 Hart's Building, Sixth Street, above Chestnut.
- Campbell Morfit (1856). A treatise on chemistry applied to the manufacture of soap and candles: being a thorough exposition, in all their minutiae, of the principles and practice of the trade, based upon the most recent discoveries in science and art. Parry and McMillan.
- Campbell Morfit (1857). Chemical and pharmaceutical manipulations. Lindsay and Blakiston.
- John Henry Alexander; Campbell Morfit (1861). Experiments on Mr. Babbage's method of distinguishing light-houses: reported to a committee of the United States Light-House Board. Govt. Print. Off.
- JAMES C. BOOTH; AND CAMPBELL MORFIT. (1862). miscellaneous collections.
- Campbell Morfit (1872). A practical treatise on pure fertilizers: and the chemical conversion of rock guanos, marlstones, coprolites, and the crude phosphates of lime and alumina generally, into various valuable products. D. Van Nostrand.
- Campbell Morfit (1873). A practical treatise on pure fertilizers: and the chemical conversion of rock guanos, marlstones, coprolites, and the crude phosphates of lime and alumina generally into valuable products. Trübner.
- Campbell Morfit; Edward Solly. Syllabus of a Complete Course of Lectures on Chemistry: Including Its Application to the Arts, Agriculture, and Mining. BiblioBazaar. ISBN 1-144-12099-3.
