= Gebrehiwot Baykedagn =

Ethiopian economist (1886–1919)

- ገብረሂዎት ባይከዳኝ
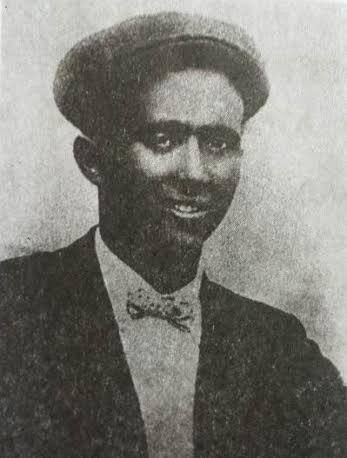
- Gebrehiwot Baykedagn (c. 1910s)
- Born: 30 July 1886; May Mesham (near Adwa), Tigray Province, Ethiopian Empire
- Died: 1 July 1919 (aged 32); Dire Dawa, Ethiopian Empire
- Occupations: Doctor, economist, intellectual, government official
- Era: Early 20th century
- Known for: Early development economics in Ethiopia; advocating economic modernization and administrative reforms, bureaucratic rationalism, abolition of slavery and unjust taxation
- Notable work: Atse Menelik na Ethiopia (1912), Mengistna ye Hizb Astadadar (1924)

Negadras Gebrehiwot Baykedagn (30 July 1886 – 1 July 1919) was an Ethiopian doctor, economist, and intellectual who served under Emperor Menelik II and Haile Selassie. He is regarded as a pioneer of development economics in Africa.

== Life ==
He was born in 1886 in Adwa, Tigray. In a trip to the port of Massawa, Gebrehiwot and his friends got permission from the captain of a German ship to visit the ship. On departure, he stowed away (this may not have been deliberate, according to Alemayehu Geda, 2004). On arrival, the captain entrusted the young boy to a rich Austrian family, who adopted him. This good fortune opened to him the opportunity to study the German language and to go to school. His exposure to Western education was thorough, and he pursued medical studies at Berlin University. He returned to his country and became private secretary and interpreter to the Emperor Menelik II, who defeated the Italian colonial army in 1896 at the Battle of Adwa. Later on, while the Haile Selassie was still the successor to the throne, he fulfilled important administrative functions. He served as inspector of the important Addis Ababa-Djibouti railway until his premature death in 1919.

== In government ==
Becoming an important member of Menelik's entourage, Heywät served as a senior counsel and advised on and was a strong proponent of Ethiopia's modernisation. Specifically, Heywät sought to integrate Ethiopia into the global economy while maintaining Ethiopia's cultural and political integrity. Deeply concerned with the state of the Ethiopian economy, and understanding the economic importance of a productive middle class, Heywät pushed for structural social, political, and economic reform, which are partially reflected in efforts to remove unjust taxation and patrimonialism, while bureaucratic rationalism, the prohibition of slavery, and the elimination of noble privileges were promoted. Heywät exerted a considerable degree of influence over Menlik's making of policy, which was compounded by the influence of other senior policymakers that were informally grouped as the 'Young Japanisers' - a loose grouping that sought to replicate Japan's industrialisation, which included the likes of Heruy Wolde Selassie. A lead advocate of industrialisation, Heywät's publication of Government and Public Administration advised the emperor to 'follow the example of the Japanese government' or 'be enslaved'. Following Menelik's death and the 1916 coup, he was first appointed controller of the (French built) railways and later collector of customs in Dérre Dawa, where he died.

== Major works ==
He published two majors works in Amharic, the Ethiopian national language: "Mengistna ye Hizb Astadadar", published in 1924 after his death and translated into English in 1995 as "State and Economy of Early 20th Century Ethiopia"; and in 1912, "Atse Menilik na Ethiopia", which was translated into French in 1993 as "L'Empereur Menelik et L'Ethiopie".

Professor Emeritus of History at Addis Ababa University, Professor Bahru Zewde tells us that the latter book was written with the hopes that Menelik’s successor, Iyasu V would take up his recommendations and proceed to modernize the Ethiopian state.

While his recommendations went unheeded by a young prince little interested in the affairs of state, Gebrehiwot went on to exert considerable influence on Ethiopian affairs for the rest of the century. His writings expressed deep concern with national institutions, structural economics, income inequality in development, and trade imbalance between developed and underdeveloped nations. It is for this reason that Addis Ababa University Professor of Economics Dr. Alemayehu Geda calls Gebrehiwot one of the world’s pioneers in the study of "Development Economics".

== Death ==
After his death at the age of 34, his ideas went on to influence generations of Ethiopian intellectuals. One can clearly distinguish Gebrehiwot’s ideas in the thought processes of the young revolutionaries of the 1970s.
