= Mathew Carey =

American publisher and economist (1760–1839)

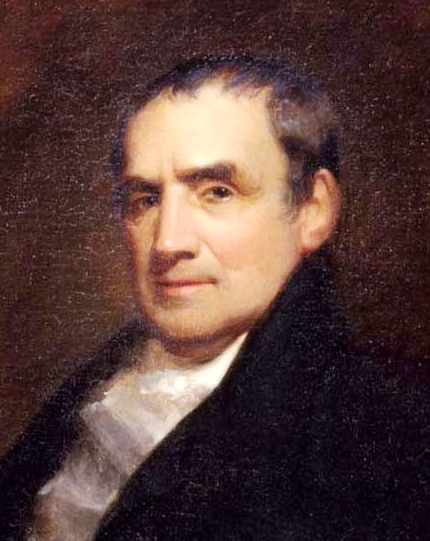
- Mathew Carey by John Neagle (detail), 1825
- Born: January 28, 1760; Dublin, Ireland
- Died: September 16, 1839 (aged 79)

Mathew Carey (January 28, 1760 – September 16, 1839) was an Irish-born American publisher and economist who lived and worked in Philadelphia, Pennsylvania. In Dublin, he had engaged in the cause of parliamentary reform, and in America, attracting the wrath of Federalists, retained his democratic sympathies. However, he broke with the emerging Democratic Party and its southern constituency by offering a defense of economic protectionism. He was the father of economist Henry Charles Carey.

== Early life and education ==
Carey was born in 1760 in Dublin into a middle-class Catholic family.

He entered the bookselling and printing business in 1775, apprenticing with the Hibernian Journal, or Chronicle of Liberty, one of the most radical newspapers in the country. In 1778, it published an address to the people of Ireland by Benjamin Franklin, and proposed that the American patriots were fighting for the same rights and freedoms sought by the Irish.

In 1777, at the age of seventeen, Carey published a pamphlet criticizing dueling. He followed this with a work criticizing the severity of the Irish penal code, and another criticizing the Irish Parliament, then the exclusive reserve of the landed Protestant Ascendancy. As a result, the British House of Commons threatened him with prosecution. In 1781 Carey fled to Paris as a political refugee. There he met Franklin, the American ambassador. Franklin took Carey to work in his printing office.

Carey worked for Franklin for a year before returning to Ireland, where he edited two Irish patriot newspapers committed to the cause of parliamentary reform, The Freeman's Journal and The Volunteer's Journal. Carey gained passage on a ship to emigrate to the newly independent United States in September 1784.

== Immigration and career in America ==
Upon Carey's arrival in Philadelphia, he found that Franklin had recommended him to Gilbert du Motier, Marquis de Lafayette, who gave him a $400 check to establish himself. He used this money to set up a new publishing business and a book shop. he founded:

- The Pennsylvania Herald (1785)
- Columbian Magazine (1786), and
- The American Museum.

None of these ventures proved very profitable. The American Museum was the first American periodical to treat American culture as rich and original, instead of a poor imitation of Great Britain's. Carey printed the first American version of the Douay–Rheims Bible in 48 weekly installments; this Roman Catholic edition is popularly known as the Carey Bible. Subscribers could arrange to have it bound. It was the first Roman Catholic version of the Bible printed in the United States. Carey also printed numerous editions of the King James Version, fundamental to English-speaking peoples.

In 1794–1796, Carey published America's first atlases. His 1802 map of Washington, D.C., was the first to name the stretch of land west of the United States Capitol as the "Mall".

He frequently wrote articles on various social topics, including events during the Yellow Fever Epidemic of 1793, which proved a crisis for the city. Carey reported on debates in the state legislature as well as providing political commentary in his essays. He was a Catholic and a founding member of the American Sunday-School Society, along with Quaker merchant Thomas P. Cope, Benjamin Rush and Episcopal bishop William White.

In December 1798, the leading Federalist paper, the Gazette of the United States, identified Carey as a leading light within the recently formed American Society of United Irishmen, alongside his Market Street neighbor, the publisher of the Jeffersonian paper, Philadelphia Aurora, William Duane, and Theobald Wolfe Tone's confidante in America, James Reynolds. Against the backdrop of America's Quasi War with French and of the Haitian Revolution (then still under the flag of the French Republic), William Cobbett, linked the association of United Irish exiles to the purportedly levelling tendencies of the emerging Democratic-Republican Party, and of conspiring with Paris to organise slave revolts and "thus involve the whole country in rebellion and bloodshed".

Carey had refused to publish Cobbett's Observations on the Emigration of Dr. Joseph Priestly. Priestley, the founder in England of the Unitarian Church, was also accused by Cobbett of French-inspired revolutionary subversion.

In 1822 Carey published Essays on Political Economy; or, The Most Certain Means of Promoting the Wealth, Power, Resources, and Happiness of Nations, Applied Particularly to the United States. This was one of the first treatises favoring Alexander Hamilton's protectionist economic policy.

During Carey's lifetime, the publishing firm evolved to M. Carey & Son (1817–1821), M. Carey & Sons (1821–1824), and then to Carey & Lea (1824). Carey retired in 1825, leaving the publishing business to his son, Henry Charles Carey and son-in-law Isaac Lea.

Lea and Henry Carey made the business economically successful and, for a time, it was one of the most prominent publishers in the country. The business published such works as: The Encyclopedia Americana, a dictionary of German lexicon, as well as American editions of the works of authors Sir Walter Scott and James Fenimore Cooper.

== Honors ==
In 1821, Carey was elected as a member to the American Philosophical Society in Philadelphia.

== Politics ==
Upon arriving in America, Carey quickly developed political connections in the developing country. One of his most important supporters was John Adams, still a leading figure of the Federalist Party at the time. Carey's passionate support for the establishment of an American Navy contributed significantly to his alliance with the Federalists.

Throughout his political career in America, Carey supported the development and maintenance of American naval strength, even after joining Jefferson's Democratic-Republicans in 1796. Carey's political realignment occurred shortly before the American ratification of the Jay Treaty, primarily intended to ensure peace with Britain, while distancing America from France.

Carey was an advocate for tariffs.

Carey's strong support of American naval power and his "early political activities in Ireland had developed in part, by the American navy's decision to carry the war [the American Revolution] into the home waters of Great Britain. John Paul Jones's victory over HMS Drake off Belfast in June 1778 unleashed a torrent of pro-American sentiment." His publishing in America channeled his energy toward productive political objectives. His published works are credited with swaying public opinion toward the establishment of a powerful American navy.

Carey's book Naval History of the United States was meant to influence the public. Its conspicuous omission of naval activity during the American Quasi-War with France showed his political intentions. It helped direct political energy against the British, with which the U.S. was at war at the time of the book's publication on May 6, 1813.

Focus on the British, known around the world for their naval power, made an influential case for extending the reach of the American navy. Along with his publication of Naval History, Carey wrote Olive Branch, published in 1814. He tried to eliminate competition between the two American political parties to create unity during the War of 1812. To many people, these efforts, and his early relationship with Franklin, made him the logical choice as Franklin's political successor. Scholars believe that he contributed significantly by his books and publications to the establishment of the United States Whig Party.

== Marriage and family ==
Carey and his wife Bridget Flahaven Carey (1769–1839) had at least eight children, including sons Henry, Edward L. Carey (d. 1845), and Charles William Carey, (1802-); and daughters Maria, Susan, Elizabeth, Ellen and Frances Anne.

Frances Anne Carey (1799–1873) married Isaac Lea, who joined the Careys' publishing firm and became a partner. In 1833, Isaac Lea took on a new partner, William A. Blanchard. After the death of Mathew Carey and retirement of his son Henry Carey, they changed the business name to "Lea and Blanchard". Later Lea took on his own sons, and they changed the name to "Lea Brothers and Company."

== Death and legacy ==
Carey was elected a member of the American Antiquarian Society in 1815. A significant portion of his business papers, as well as a very large number of original copies of works printed and/or published by him reside in the collections of the AAS.

Carey died on September 16, 1839, and was buried in St. Mary's Catholic Churchyard in Philadelphia.

In 1943, Publishers Weekly created the Carey-Thomas Award for creative publishing, naming it in honor of Mathew Carey and Isaiah Thomas.

== See also ==
- Early American publishers and printers
- History of Irish Americans in Philadelphia

== Citations ==
Notes

== Bibliography ==
- Adelman, Joseph M. (Fall 2013). "Trans-Atlantic Migration and the Printing Trade in Revolutionary America". Early American Studies. 11 (3). University of Pennsylvania Press: 516–544. doi:10.1353/eam.2013.0026. JSTOR 23547682. S2CID 144423922.
- Bradsher, Earl Lockridge (1912). Mathew Carey, editor, author and publisher; a study in American literary development. New York: The Columbia University Press.
- Carey, Mathew (1942) [1834]. Mathew Carey autobiography. Brooklyn: E.L. Schwaab.
- Carter, Edward C. "Mathew Carey, Advocate of American Naval Power". The American Neptune, XXVI (1966).
- Carter, Michael S. "Under the Benign Sun of Toleration: Mathew Carey, the Douai Bible, and Catholic Print Culture, 1789–1791," Journal of the Early Republic, Fall 2007.
- Clark, Thomas. Naval History of the United States. Philadelphia:Mathew Carey, 1814
- Remer, Rosalind (1996). Printers and men of capital: Philadelphia book publishers in the new republic. Philadelphia: University of Pennsylvania Press. ISBN 978-0-8122-33377.
