= James Curtis Booth =

American chemist and US Mint refiner (1810–1888)

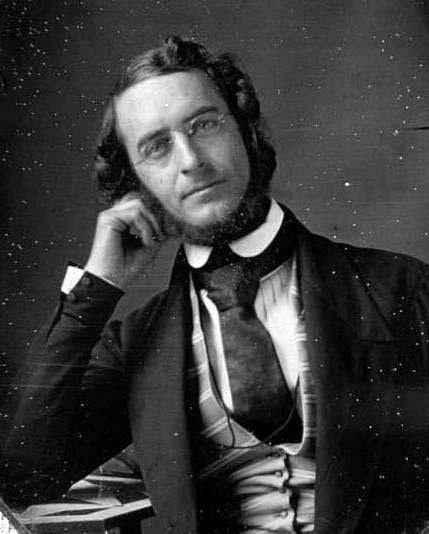
- 1851 photograph of Booth by John Jabez Edwin Mayall
- Born: 28 July 1810; Philadelphia
- Died: 21 March 1888 (87 years old); West Haverford, Pennsylvania
- Education: University of Pennsylvania (1829); Rensselaer Polytechnic Institute
- Occupation: Chemist

James Curtis Booth (28 July 1810 – 21 March 1888) was an American chemist who was the melter and refiner at the United States Mint in Philadelphia for many years.

== Early life and education ==
Booth was born in Philadelphia on 28 July 1810. After schooling at Hartsville Seminary, Booth graduated from the University of Pennsylvania in 1829, and later studied at the Rensselaer Polytechnic Institute at Troy, New York from 1831 to 1832. He visited Germany between 1833 and 1835, spending the year of 1833 in Professor Friedrich Wöhler's private laboratory in Hesse-Cassel, and then spending nine months in the laboratory of Professor Heinrich Gustav Magnus in Berlin. For the remainder of his time in Europe he attended lectures and visited manufacturing facilities on the continent and in England.

== Career ==
Booth assisted in the Geological Survey of Pennsylvania in 1836, making the discovery that the mountains that form the middle belt of that state consist of two separate formations. He was head of the Geological Survey of Delaware from 1837 to 1838. He became a member of the American Philosophical Society in January 1839.

Booth opened a chemistry laboratory in Pennsylvania in 1836 for teaching purposes, which gained a strong reputation. As the demand for teaching and chemical analysis increased, he was assisted by Dr. Martin Hans Boyè until 1845. From 1848, Thomas H. Garrett was his associate, and in 1881, the firm became Booth, Garrett and Blair. It became an important training ground for chemists studying analytical and manufacturing processes.

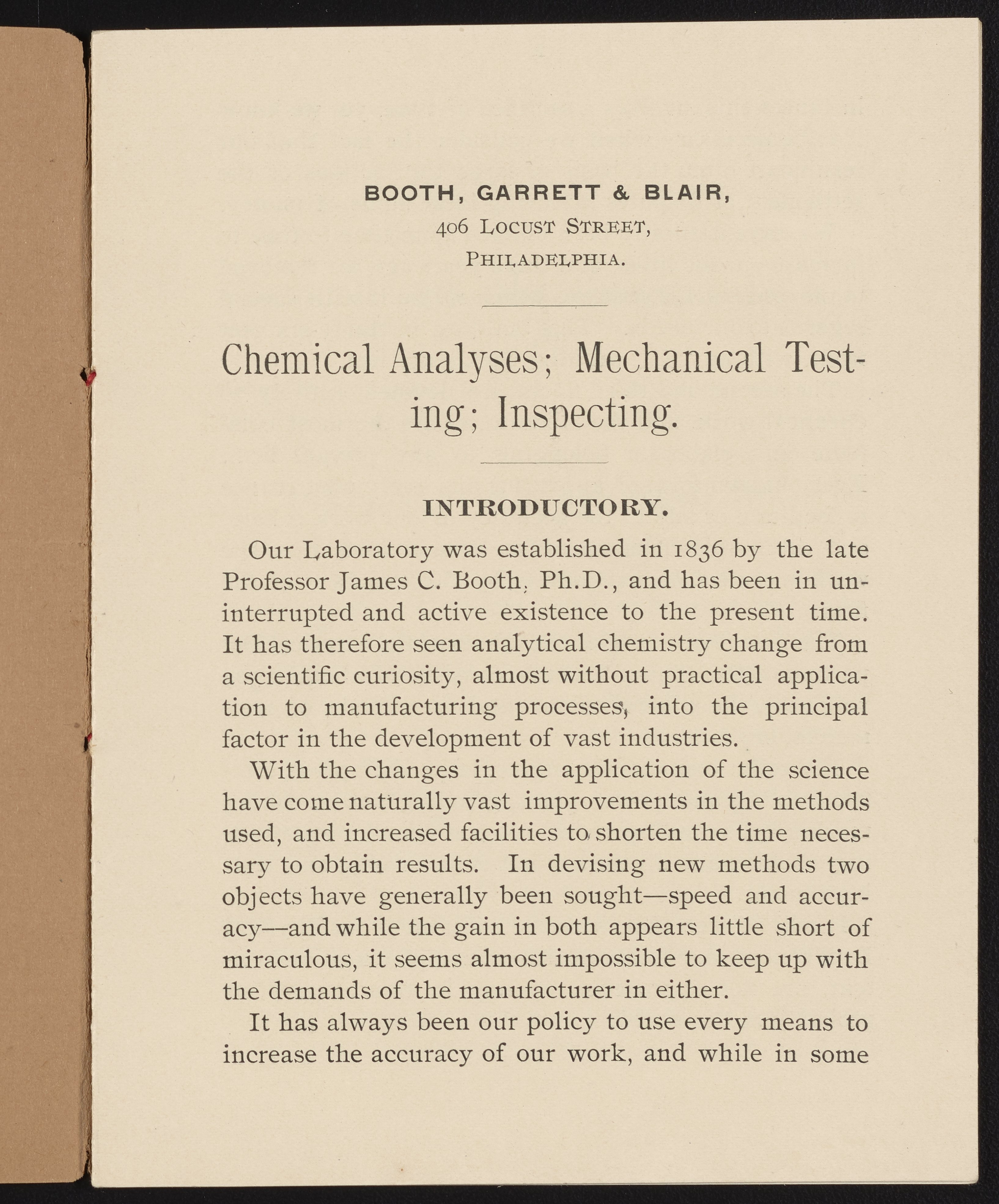
Page from the Booth, Garrett and Blair laboratory's pamphlet

According to the Scientific American, a course in Booth's laboratory "was considered necessary for the chemist of that time, and was regarded of more value than a college diploma". Students who went on to have notable scientific careers included John Fries Frazer, Richard Sears McCulloh, Campbell Morfit and Clarence Morfit. Booth lectured at the Franklin Institute between 1836 and 1845. In 1843 his book the Encyclopedia of Chemistry was published. In 1845, Booth spent some time in Mine La Motte, Missouri mining cobalt, but the venture was not successful.

In 1849, he was appointed melter and refiner in the Mint by President Zachary Taylor, working there until he retired in 1887. He and his former pupil Richard Sears McCulloch both invented methods of refining California gold that involved combining the ore with zinc, and the two men agreed to combine their inventions into a single patent, which they sold to an interested industrialist. In 1850, he was appointed a professor by the University of Pennsylvania at their newly created Department of Chemistry as Applied Arts, but his work at the mint only let him undertake his work part-time. However, he continued to teach at the university until 1855. While at the mint he designed a new form of wind furnace for melting the huge amount of gold being mined in California. His analysis of the nickel ores of Pennsylvania led to the use of nickel as a component of the cent issued in 1857.

The University of Lewisburg conferred the degree of LL.D. on him in 1867, and the Rensselaer Polytechnic Institute gave him a Ph.D. in 1884. He was a member of the American Philosophical Society, and was president of the American Chemical Society from 1883 to 1884. Booth married in 1853 and became the father of three children. He died at his home in West Haverford, Pennsylvania, on 21 March 1888.

== Bibliography ==
- James Curtis Booth (1841). Memoir of the geological survey of the State of Delaware: including the application of the geological observations to agriculture. S. Kimmey.
- James Curtis Booth; Campbell Morfit (1851). On recent improvements in the chemical arts. Smithsonian Inst.
- James Curtis Booth (1852). The phonographic instructor: being an introduction to the corresponding style of phonography. E.H. Butler & Co.
- Victor Regnault; Thomas Forrest Betton; James Curtis Booth; William L. Faber (1856). Elements of chemistry: for the use of colleges, academies, and schools, Volume 1. J. B. Lippincott.
- James Curtis Booth; Campbell Morfit (1850). The encyclopedia of chemistry: practical and theoretical: embracing its application to the arts, metallurgy, mineralogy, geology, medicine, and pharmacy. H.C. Baird.
