= Hagoromo =

Hagoromo (羽衣), literally "feather garment", may refer to:

- Feather cloak#Japan worn by the celestial women (tennyo) in Japanese legend or art
- Hagoromo Fulltouch Chalk, a Japanese brand of blackboard chalk originally produced by Hagoromo Bungu
- Hagoromo Gitsune, one of the main antagonists in Nura: Rise of the Yokai Clan
- Hagoromo, a small space orbiter released by the Japanese spacecraft Hiten
- Hagoromo (play), a Japanese Noh play
- Hagoromo Club, a former football club based in Shimizu-ku, Shizuoka
- Hagoromo International University, a private university in Osaka
- Hagoromo Gakuen Junior College, a former junior college
- Hagoromo Station, a railway station in Osaka Prefecture
- Hagoromo Ōtsutsuki, a character in the manga and anime series Naruto
