= Chalk art =

Chalk art may refer to:

- Art created using sidewalk chalk
- Chalkboard art
- Street painting done with chalk

== See also ==
- Chalk carving
- Geoglyph made with chalk
