= Greenboard =

Greenboard may refer to

- a green-colored blackboard
- green-colored drywall (in contrast to normal drywall suitable for damp places like kitchen or bathroom)
