= Conic Sections Rebellion =

Educational event against exam policy

The Conic Sections Rebellion, also known as the Conic Section Rebellion, refers primarily to an incident which occurred at Yale University in 1830, as a result of changes in the methods of mathematics education. When a policy change dictated that students were required to draw reference diagrams for exams rather than be allowed to refer to diagrams in their textbooks, students staged a rebellion in which they refused to take the exams at all. Because of this, 43 of the 96 students were expelled.

A precursor incident occurred in 1825; historian Clarence Deming described the 1830 incident as being "much more serious", and stated that the two incidents should be "sharply demarcated".

== 1825 incident ==
In 1825, students of the Yale sophomore class claimed that "by explicit contract with (their) mathematical tutor, (they were) exempt from the corollaries of the text-book (on conic sections)", and refused to recite these corollaries. Thirty-eight students out of a class of eighty-seven, including Horace Bushnell, William H. Welch, Henry Hogeboom, and William Adams, were suspended; faculty contacted the students' parents, and the students were pressured into signing a statement of concession:

We, the undersigned, having been led into a course of opposition to the government of Yale College, do acknowledge our fault in this resistance, and promise, on being restored to our standing in the class, to yield a faithful obedience to the laws (of Yale College).

— Statement of concession which ended the Conic Sections Rebellion of 1825.

== 1830 incident ==
Before blackboards were introduced, Yale students were permitted to consult diagrams in their textbooks when solving geometry problems involving conic sections, including during exams. When the university required students to draw their own diagrams on the blackboard, they refused to take the final exam. As a result, 43 of the 96 students were expelled, including Alfred Stillé and Andrew Calhoun, the son of John C. Calhoun. Yale authorities warned neighboring universities not to admit the expelled students.
