= Alfred Stillé =

American physician (1813–1900)

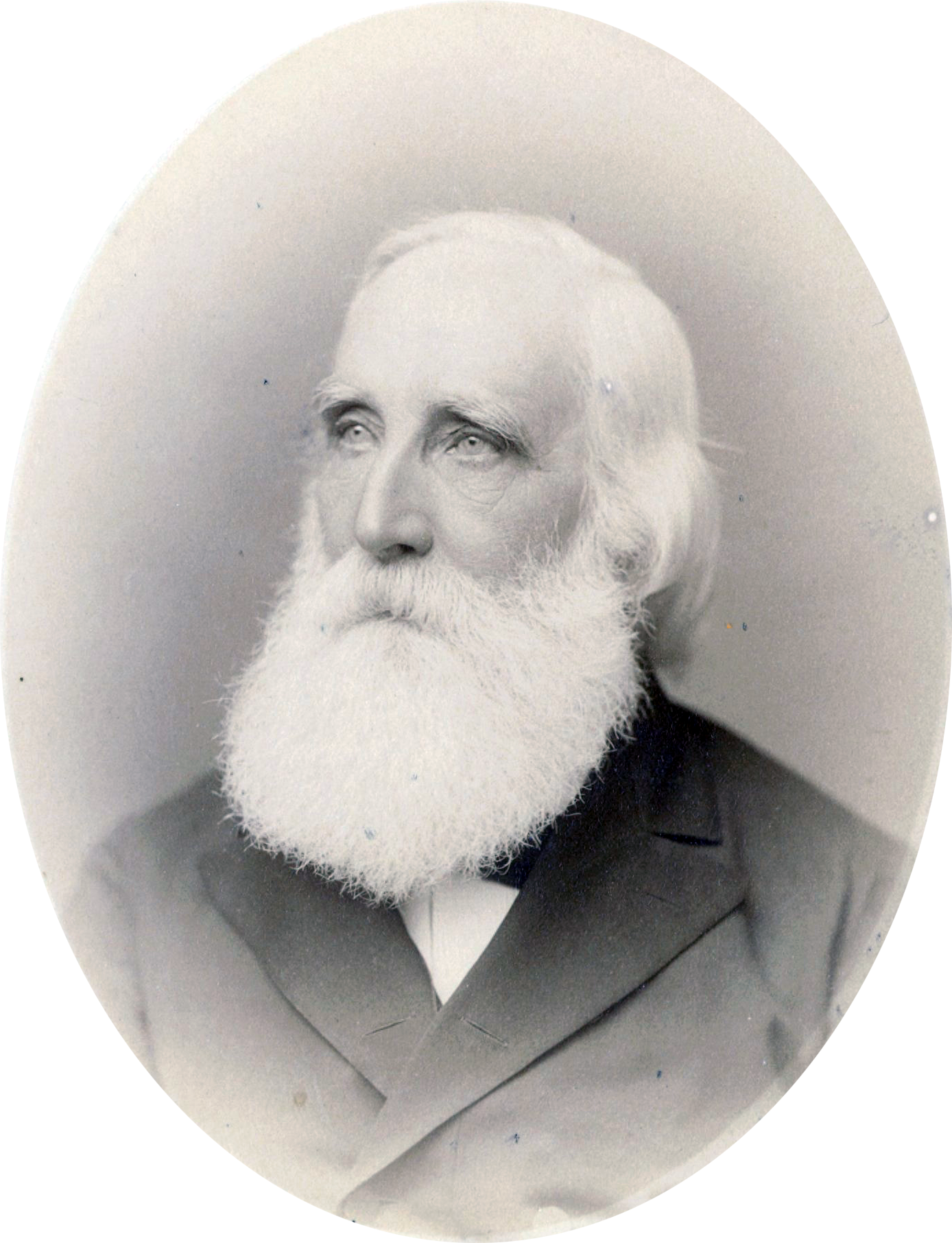
- Born: October 30, 1813; Philadelphia, Pennsylvania, U.S.
- Died: September 24, 1900 (aged 86); Philadelphia, Pennsylvania, U.S.
- Resting place: Laurel Hill Cemetery, Philadelphia, Pennsylvania, U.S.
- Education: University of Pennsylvania (A.B., 1832); University of Pennsylvania (A.M., 1835); Medical department of the University of Pennsylvania (M.D., 1836)
- Known for: Distinguishing between typhus and typhoid fever *President of the American Medical Association 1871-1872
- Medical career
- Profession: Physician, Professor

Alfred Stillé (October 30, 1813 – September 24, 1900) was an American physician and medical educator. He was a professor of medicine at Pennsylvania Medical College from 1864 to 1884 and at the University of Pennsylvania. He served as Chair of Medicine at the University of Pennsylvania and was one of the first physicians to differentiate between typhus and typhoid fever. He helped to establish the American Medical Association and served as president from 1871 to 1872.

== Early life and education ==
Stillé was born on October 30, 1813, in Philadelphia, Pennsylvania, to John and Maria (Wagner) Stillé. He studied classics at Yale University, but was expelled for his participation in the Conic Sections Rebellion. He transferred to the University of Pennsylvania, was a member of Phi Beta Kappa, and received an A.B. degree in 1832. He received an A.M. degree from the University of Pennsylvania in 1835 and in 1836 an M.D. from the school's department of medicine.

== Career ==
Stillé studied anatomy at Philadelphia Hospital and participated in a study during the 1836 typhus epidemic in Philadelphia to differentiate typhus from typhoid fever. He subsequently traveled to Paris to learn medical diagnoses under Pierre Charles Alexandre Lewis. He returned from Europe and worked as a resident physician at Philadelphia Hospital from 1839 to 1841. He accepted a role as lecturer on pathology and medicine at the Philadelphia Association for Medical Instruction. He worked as a professor of the theory and practice of medicine at Pennsylvania Medical College from 1845 to 1849 and as a visiting physician at St. Joseph's Hospital in 1849.

He was elected as a member of the American Philosophical Society in 1852. In 1859, he became the president of the Pathological Society of Philadelphia. During the American Civil War, he served as a surgeon at Saterlee Hospital. In 1862 he served as president of the Philadelphia County Medical Society. He worked as a professor of medicine at the University of Pennsylvania from 1864 to 1884 and later as Chair of Medicine.

In the 1840s, he was a leader of a movement to implement reforms in medical education which resulted in the formation of the American Medical Association. He served as the first secretary and as president of the association from 1871 to 1872. He was not always at the forefront of scientific knowledge though. His publications in the 1870s and 1880s refused to accept the germ theory of disease or bacteriology.

He died on September 24, 1900, in Philadelphia and was interred at Laurel Hill Cemetery.

== Personal life ==
He married Caroline Christiana Barrett in 1841 and together they three children. Caroline was institutionalized due to mental illness for over 50 years and died in 1899. He married Katharine A. Blakiston six weeks after Caroline's death.

== Publications ==
- Medical Education in the United States: An Address, Delivered to the Students of the Philadelphia Association for Medical Instruction, at the Close of the Session of 1846., Philadelphia: Isaac Ashmead, 1846
- Elements of General Pathology: A Practical Treatise of the Causes, Forms, Symptoms, and Results of Disease., Philadelphia: Lindsay and Blakiston, 1848
- The Unity of Medicine. An Introductory Lecture to the Course of Theory and Practice of Medicine, in the Medical Department of Pennsylvania College., Philadelphia: T.K. & P.G. Collins, 1856
- War as an Instrument of Civilization. An Address Before the Society of the Alumni of the University of Pennsylvania, Philadelphia: Collins, 1862
- Epidemic Meningitis or Cerebro-Spinal Meningitis, Philadelphia: Lindsay & Blakiston, 1867
- Therapeutics and Materia Medica. A Systematic Treatise of the Actions and Uses of Medicinal Agents, Including Their Description and History., Philadelphia: Henry C. Lea, 1868
- Cholera: Its Origin, History, Causation, Symptoms, Lesions, Prevention, and Treatment., Philadelphia: Lea Brothers & Co., 1885
- The National Dispensatory., Philadelphia: Lea Brothers & Co., 1887
