= Scrojo =

American poster artist

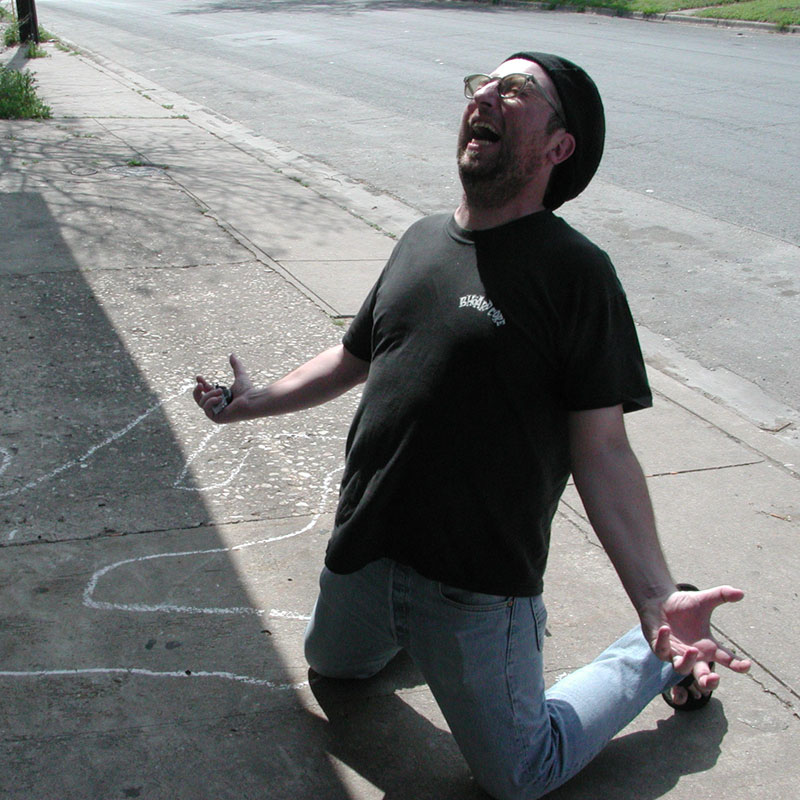
- Born: Craig Haskett; June 9, 1967 (age 59)
- Known for: Poster art, graphic design, illustration, CD covers, logo design, T-shirt design
- Movement: Gig posters, movie posters, printmaking, punk rock, psychedelic art
- Website: Scrojo.com

Scrojo (born Craig McKenzie Haskett June 9, 1967) is an American poster artist, illustrator and graphic designer. He is particularly known for his prolific work in the music industry and the surf and skate community. He has illustrated over 3,000 posters to date for concerts and other music events. Many of these have been for the Belly Up Aspen in Aspen, Colorado, as well as the Belly Up Tavern in Solana Beach, California, where he has been the resident artist for 30 years. Scrojo has also regularly worked for such notable venues as The Fillmore (San Francisco), Snapdragon Stadium (San Diego), The Casbah (San Diego ), Alamo Drafthouse (Austin), The Troubadour (Los Angeles) and House of Blues ( multiple locations ).

== Career ==
Scrojo was born in Oceanside, California, and began his career as a professional artist in the late 1980s while he was an employee of the San Diego–based Pannikin coffeehouse chain, where he decorated chalkboards with his whimsical and sometimes disturbing art. His efforts proved very popular and led to his designing chalkboard art, t-shirts and logos for 25 to 30 San Diego cafes. It was also at this time that his work was noticed by Grammy winning producer Chris Goldsmith who hired him to create a poster for a gig at the Belly Up in Solana Beach. The club loved the poster and a decades spanning association began.

Scrojo's poster and chalkboard work grabbed the attention of the multitude of surf and skateboard companies based in coastal So-Cal in the 1990s. Scrojo designed t-shirts, skateboard decks, advertising and other merchandise for dozens of action sports companies based between Del Mar and Costa Mesa. These companies include Quiksilver, O'Neill, Nectar, Tum Yeto, DGK Skateboards and Tracker Trucks. The most notable of this work was an early design, the original label for Sticky Bumps Surfwax for Wax Research. Illustrated freehand with a pen on a scrap piece of paper, the logo helped propel the brand to become the top selling surf wax in the world selling millions of bars.

His corporate work has included commissions from Nike, Inc., Disney, Harley-Davidson, the San Diego Chargers, Jägermeister, Fender Guitars, Focus Features, William Morris Endeavor, Converse, House of Marley, The Island Def Jam Music Group, the San Diego Zoo and many others.

== Publications ==
Scrojo's work is heavily featured in The Art of Modern Rock by Paul Grushkin and Dennis King. The book is considered the defining work on modern concert posters. He is also featured in the two follow-up volumes Art of Modern Rock Mini #1: A-Z and Art of Modern Rock Mini #2: Poster Girls

Other books and publications showcasing Scrojo’s work include:

- Rock Poster Art: Serigraphies de Concert by Didier Maiffredy
- Burlesque Poster Design: The Art of Tease by Yak El-Droubie and Ian C. Parliament
- Electric Frankenstein! High-Energy Punk Rock & Roll Poster Art by Sal Canzonieri
- SWAG: Rock Posters of the ‘90s by Spencer Drate foreword by Art Chantry
- Rockin Down the Highway by Paul Grushkin foreword by Mike Ness
- Show Posters: The Art and Practice of Making Gig Posters by Pat Jones and Ben Nunery
- Panda Meat foreword by Frank Kozik
- Classic Rock Posters: Sixty Years of Posters and Flyers: 1952 to 2012
- The Art of Metal: Five Decades of Heavy Metal Album Covers, Posters, T-Shirts, and More by Martin Popoff and Malcolm Dome foreword by Lemmy from Motorhead
- The Art of Gothic by Natasha Scharf
- Gig Posters by Clay Hayes
- The Art of Modern Rock Calendars
- Gig Posters: Rock Art for the 21st Century Wall Calendar 2013, 2015, & 2016

Scrojo did all the illustrations for The Ultimate PGA Tour Book of Trivia.

== Museums and exhibitions ==
Scrojo is a founding member of FLATSTOCK, an ongoing series of exhibitions of poster art that has become part of South-by-Southwest, the annual music industry confab in Austin, Bumbershoot music festival in Seattle and other music festivals across the globe.

His group shows include:

- “Lowbrow Art: Nine San Diego Pop Surrealists" at the Oceanside Museum of Art co-curated by Michael Gross, the original art director for National Lampoon
- “The Assembly of Awesomeness” at ArtLabStudios
- “TRPS Festival of Rock Posters” and “Rock Art By The Bay” in San Francisco
- “The Modern Mythological Gods of Propaganda” (with Emek and Mark Arminski) at Art Rock Gallery, San Francisco
- “Art of Modern Rock Poster Show” at the Rock and Roll Hall of Fame
- The “Art of Modern Rock” exhibit at the Experience Music Project in Seattle (Experience Music Project has Scrojo’s ”Punk-o-Rama” skateboard deck designed for LA-based Epitaph Records as part of their permanent collection.)

Solo exhibits include:

- Career Retrospective at EVE Encinitas in 2017.
- Haugaland KunstVerk in Haugesund, Norway 2011 which sold out on opening night.
- “2,375 ft High & Rising: The Painfully Prolific Poster Art of Scrojo” in 2010 at D.King Gallery in Berkeley, CA celebrating Scrojo’s 1,500th poster.
- Ducky Waddles Emporium in Leucadia

== Film and television ==
Scrojo’s posters have lent atmosphere to film and television productions, including Dave Chappelle's Block Party, Baby Driver, Spoken Word, Minority Report, Nurse Jackie and Fear The Walking Dead. His John Prine poster features prominently in the acclaimed interior design of the studio apartment set on the HBO television series Girls.

He was an early contributor to the Alamo Drafthouse’s popular poster series designing prints for showings of The Blues Brothers, Teenage Mutant Ninja Turtles and a cast attended marathon of Party Down.

Scrojo appears in the award-winning 2009 documentary American Artifact: Rise of American Rock Poster Art which is featured in the Rock and Roll Hall of Fame Museum.

== Awards ==
He won the 2006 OUT Music Award for Best Album Design for Candye Kane’s White Trash Girl.

== Concert Posters ==
Scrojo has designed posters for acts across all genres of music. Those bands include:

The Rolling Stones, Bob Dylan, Foo Fighters, Lady Gaga, The Flaming Lips, Alice In Chains, Jane's Addiction, The Pixies, Devo, Blondie, Morrissey, Joe Cocker, Tom Jones, Cheap Trick, Public Enemy, Snoop Dogg, Ice Cube, Sugar Hill Gang, B.B. King, Bo Diddley, Etta James, Henry Rollins, The Cramps, Dead Kennedys, Social Distortion, Patti Smith, Jimmy Cliff, Ziggy Marley, The Skatalites, Merle Haggard, Lyle Lovett, Kris Kristofferson, Willie Nelson, George Clinton, and Gwar

In 2016, he designed the poster for the opening date of Juan Gabriel's final tour. Gabriel was among Latin America's best selling singer-songwriters and recorded the best-selling album of all time in Mexico.
