= Blackboard =

Reusable writing surface

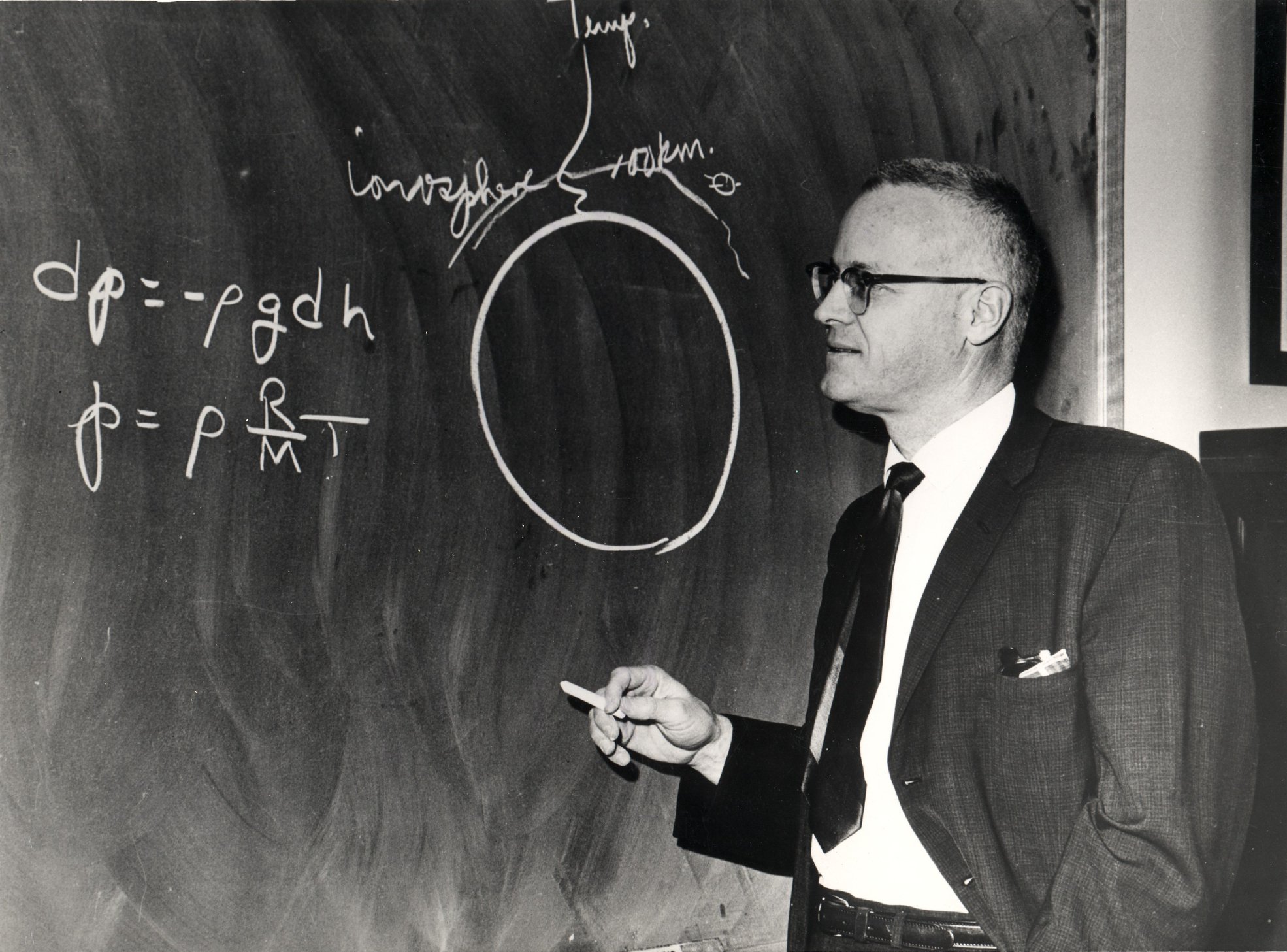
- NASA scientist Homer E. Newell Jr. explaining principles of altitude, pressure, and temperature, c. 1973
- Other names: Chalkboard, writing-board
- Uses: Reusable writing surface on which text or drawings are made

A blackboard or a chalkboard is a reusable writing surface on which text or drawings are made with sticks of calcium sulphate or calcium carbonate, better known as chalk.

Blackboards were originally made of smooth, thin sheets of black or dark grey slate stone.

== Design ==
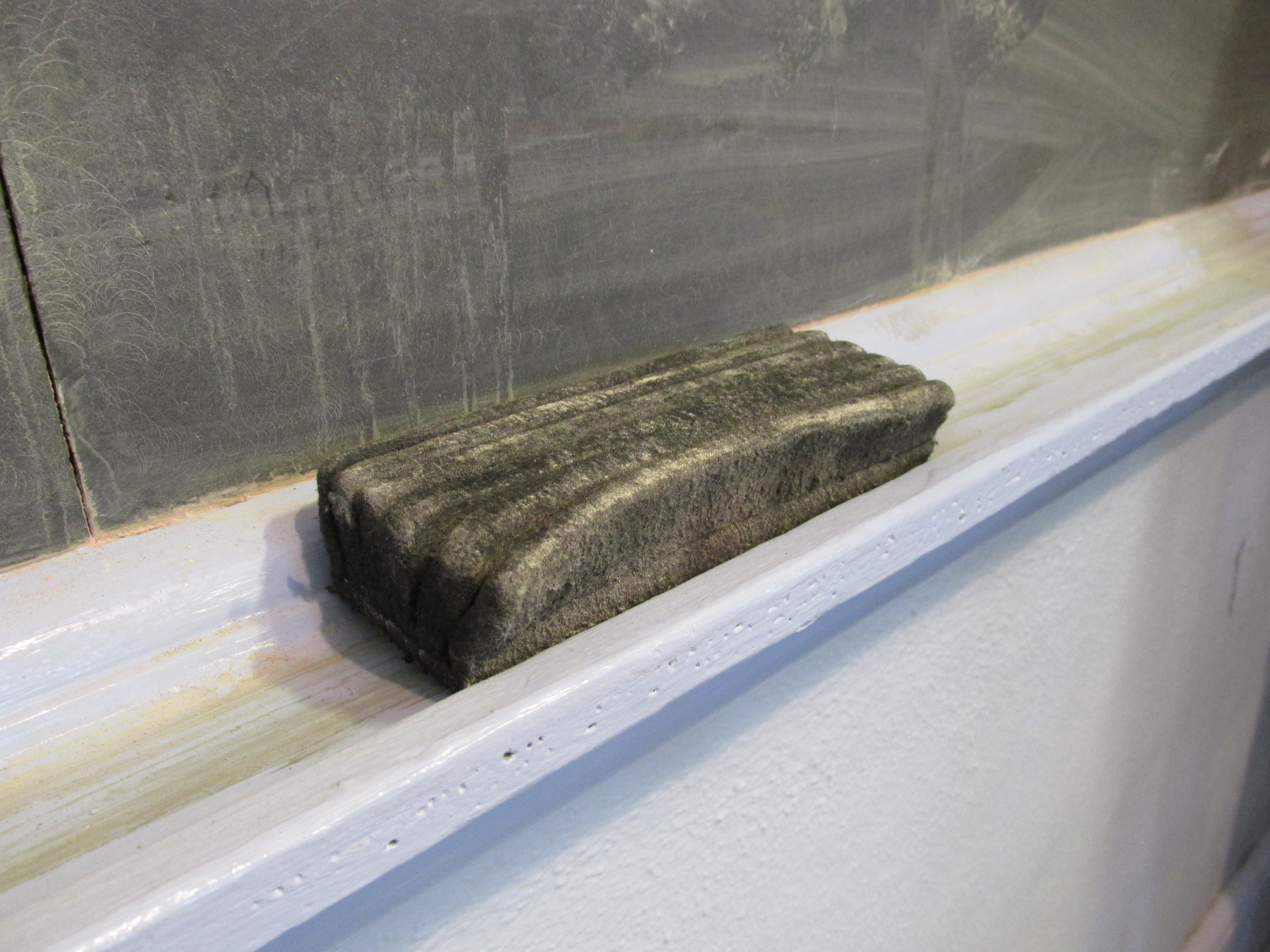
A chalkboard with an eraser in the chalk tray

A blackboard can simply be a board painted with a dark matte paint (usually black, occasionally dark green). Matte black plastic sign material (known as closed-cell PVC foamboard) is also used to create custom chalkboard art. Blackboards on an A-frame are used by restaurants and bars to advertise daily specials. Adhesive chalkboard surface is also available in stores as rolls of textured black plastic shelf covering, which is applied to the desired wall, door or other surface.

A more modern variation consists of a coiled sheet of plastic drawn across two parallel rollers, which can be scrolled to create additional writing space while saving what has been written. The highest grade blackboards are made of porcelain-enamelled steel (black, green, blue or sometimes other colours). Porcelain is very hard wearing, and blackboards made of porcelain usually last 10–20 years in intensive use.

Lecture theatres may contain a number of blackboards in a grid arrangement. The lecturer then moves boards into reach for writing and then moves them out of reach, allowing a large amount of material to be shown simultaneously.

== Chalk sticks ==
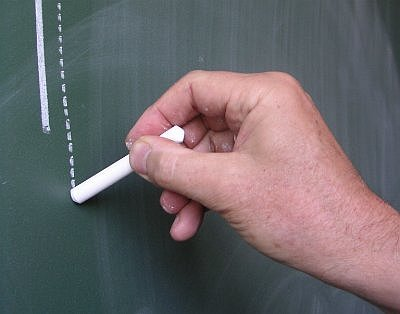
Stick-slip effect with a chalk on a blackboard

Sound of mathematical formulas written with a chalk stick on a blackboard

Chalk sticks are produced in white and in various colours, especially for use with blackboards. White chalk sticks are made mainly from calcium carbonate derived from mineral chalk or limestone, while coloured chalk sticks are made from calcium sulphate in its dihydrate form, CaSO_{4}·2H_{2}O, derived from gypsum. Chalk sticks containing calcium carbonate typically contain 40–60% of CaCO_{3} (calcite).

== Issues with use ==
The scratching of fingernails on a blackboard, as well as other pointed, especially metal objects against blackboards, produces a sound that is well known for being extremely irritating to most people. According to a study run by Michael Oehler, a professor at the University of Cologne, Germany, humans are "predisposed to detest" the sound of nails on a blackboard. The findings of the study were presented at the Acoustical Society of America conference and support earlier findings from a 1986 study by Vanderbilt psychologist Randolph Blake and two colleagues found that the sound of nails on a chalkboard annoyed people even when the high-pitch frequencies were removed. The study earned Blake a 2006 Ig Nobel Prize.

== Etymology and history ==
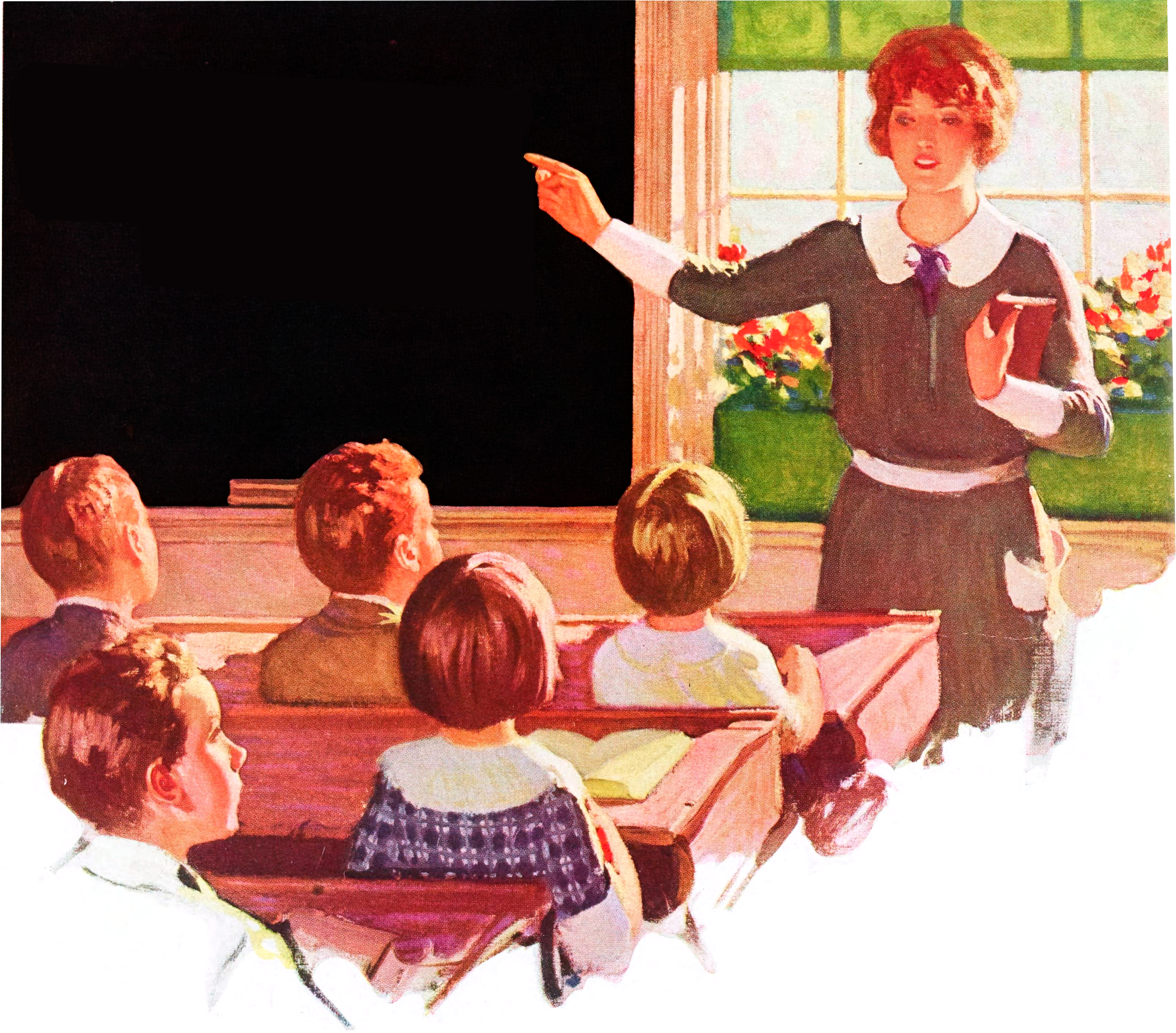
Retouched drawing of a teacher at blackboard for an advertisement, 1924

The writing slate was in use in Indian schools as mentioned in Alberuni's Indica (Tarikh Al-Hind), written in the early 11th century:

They use black tablets for the children in the schools, and write upon them along the long side, not the broadside, writing with a white material from the left to the right.

The first classroom uses of large blackboards are difficult to date, but they were used for music education and composition in Europe as far back as the 16th century. The term "blackboard" is attested in English from the mid-18th century; the Oxford English Dictionary provides a citation from 1739, to write "with Chalk on a black-Board". The first attested use of chalk on blackboard in the United States dates to September 21, 1801, in a lecture course in mathematics given by George Baron. James Pillans has been credited with the invention of coloured chalk (1814); he had a recipe with ground chalk, dyes and porridge.

The use of blackboards changed methods of education and testing, as found in the Conic Sections Rebellion of 1830 in Yale. Manufacturing of slate blackboards began by the 1840s. Green porcelain enamel surface was first used in 1930, and as this type of board became popular, the word "chalkboard" appeared. In the US, green porcelain enamelled boards started to appear at schools in the 1950s.

Once synonymous with education, blackboards have gradually become unpopular. Since the 2000s, both whiteboards and smart boards have significantly outsold them.

== Gallery ==
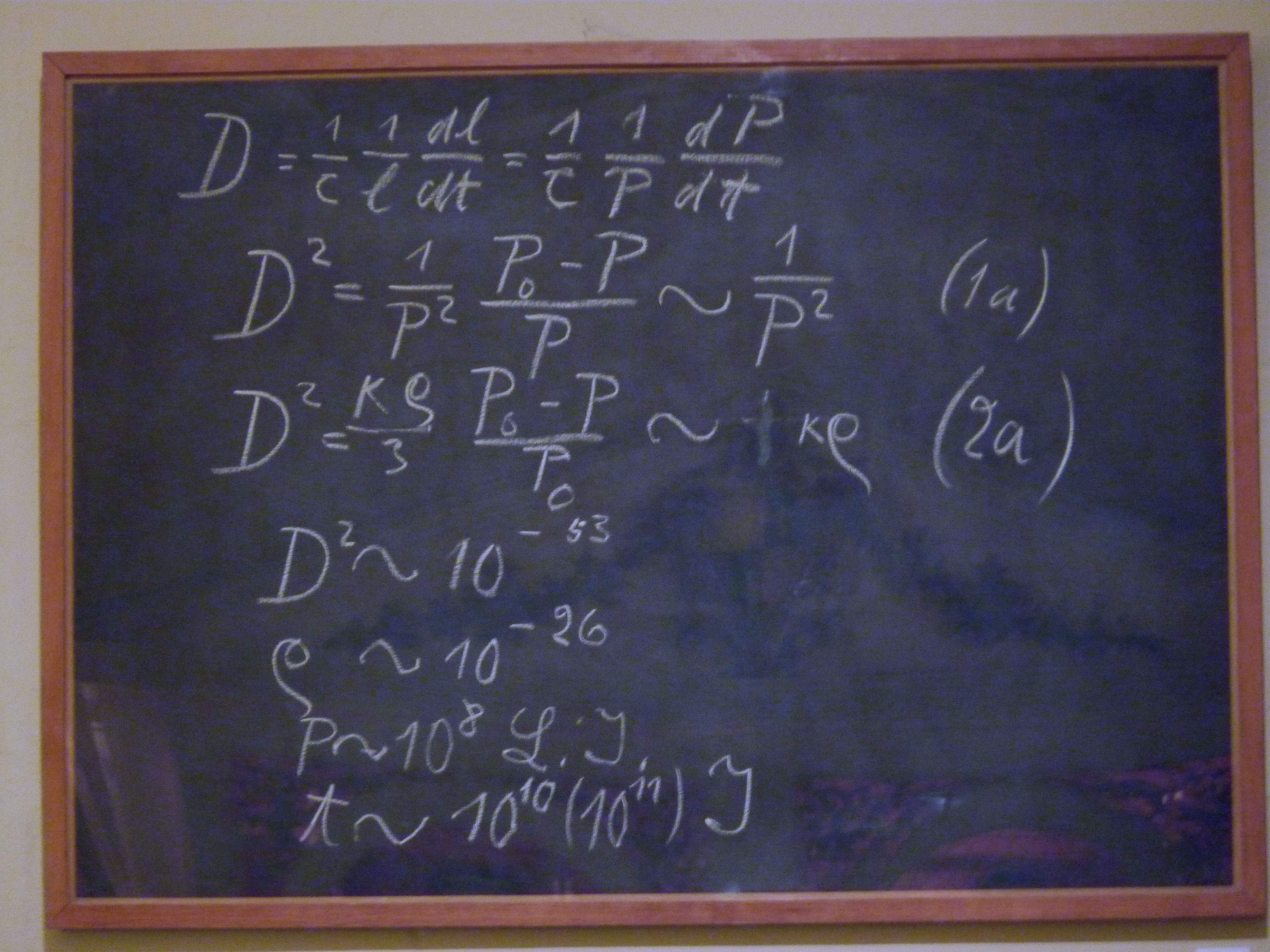
The blackboard used by Albert Einstein during lectures on cosmology at the University of Oxford, 1931

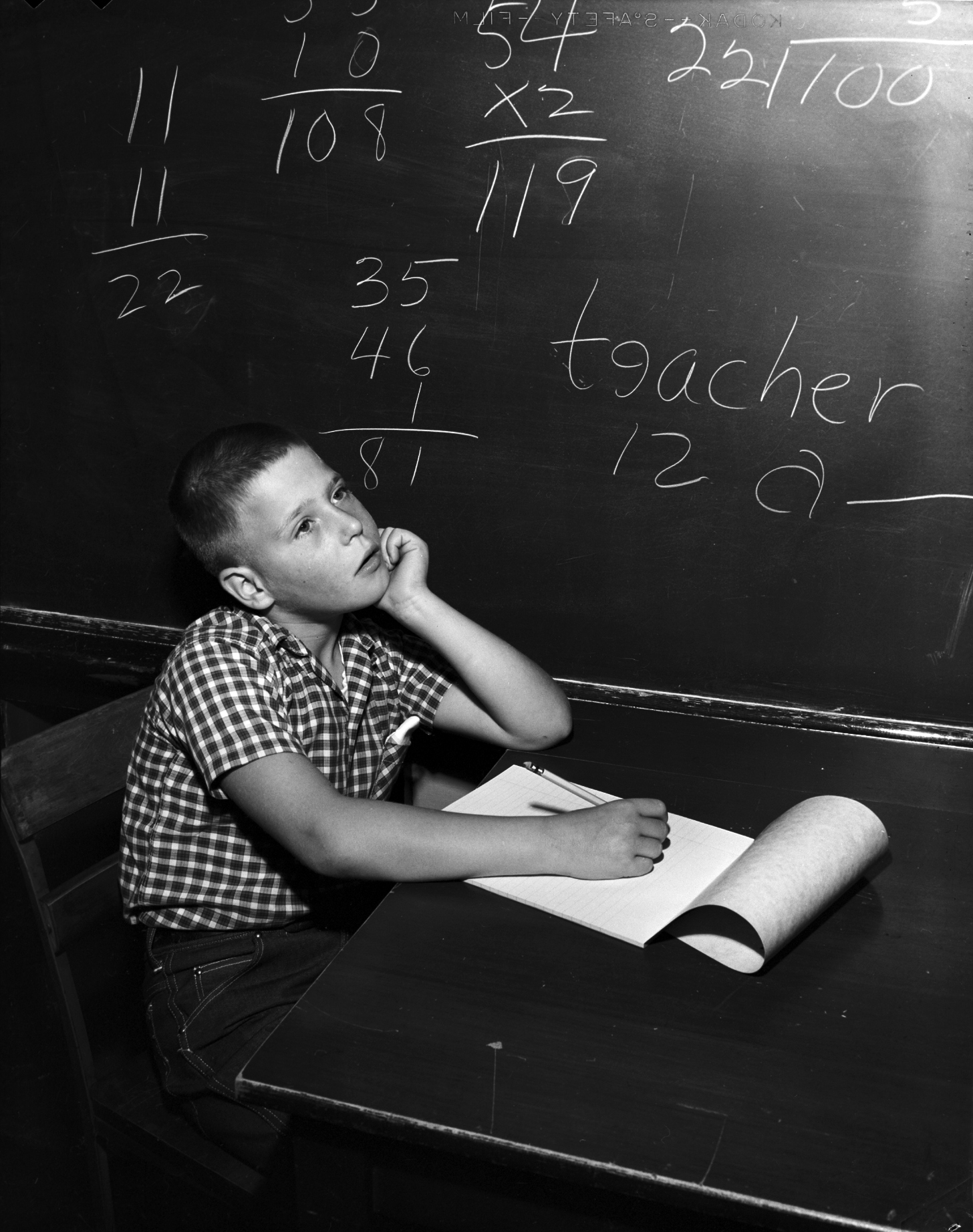
A schoolboy in Seattle, WA, US, 1961

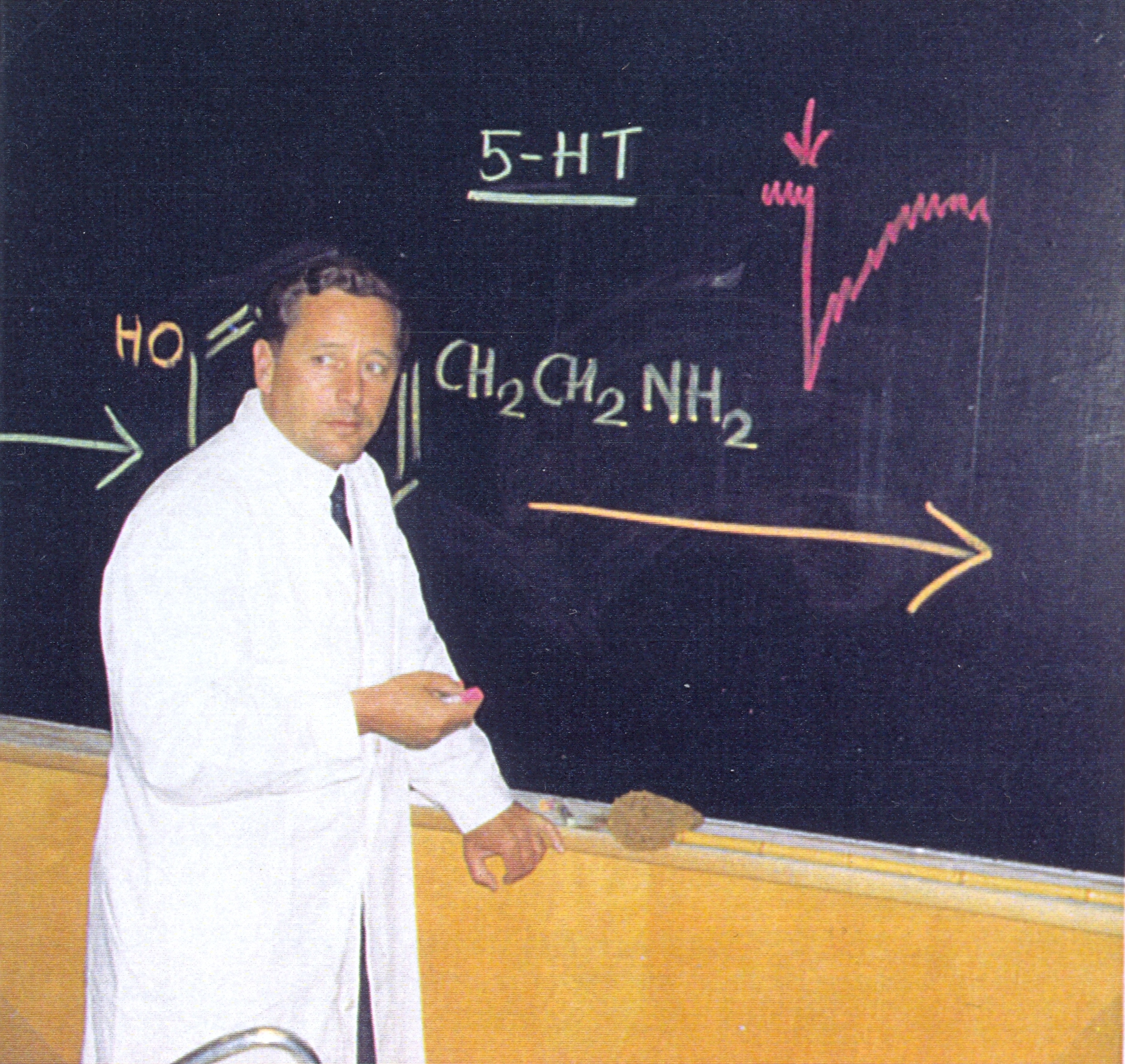
An Austrian chemist with colored chalk, 1970

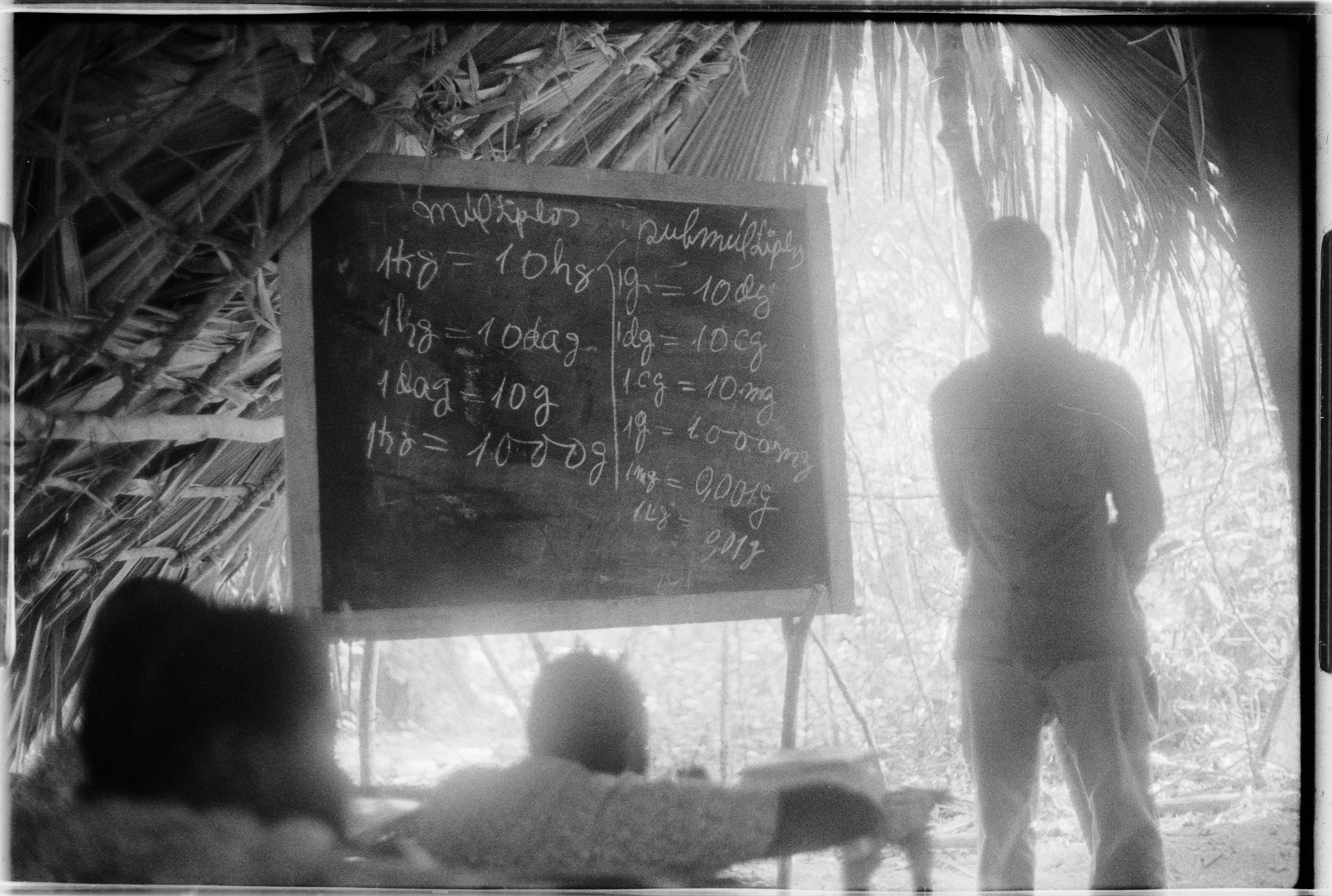
A teacher explaining the decimal system of weights using a blackboard, Guinea-Bissau, 1974

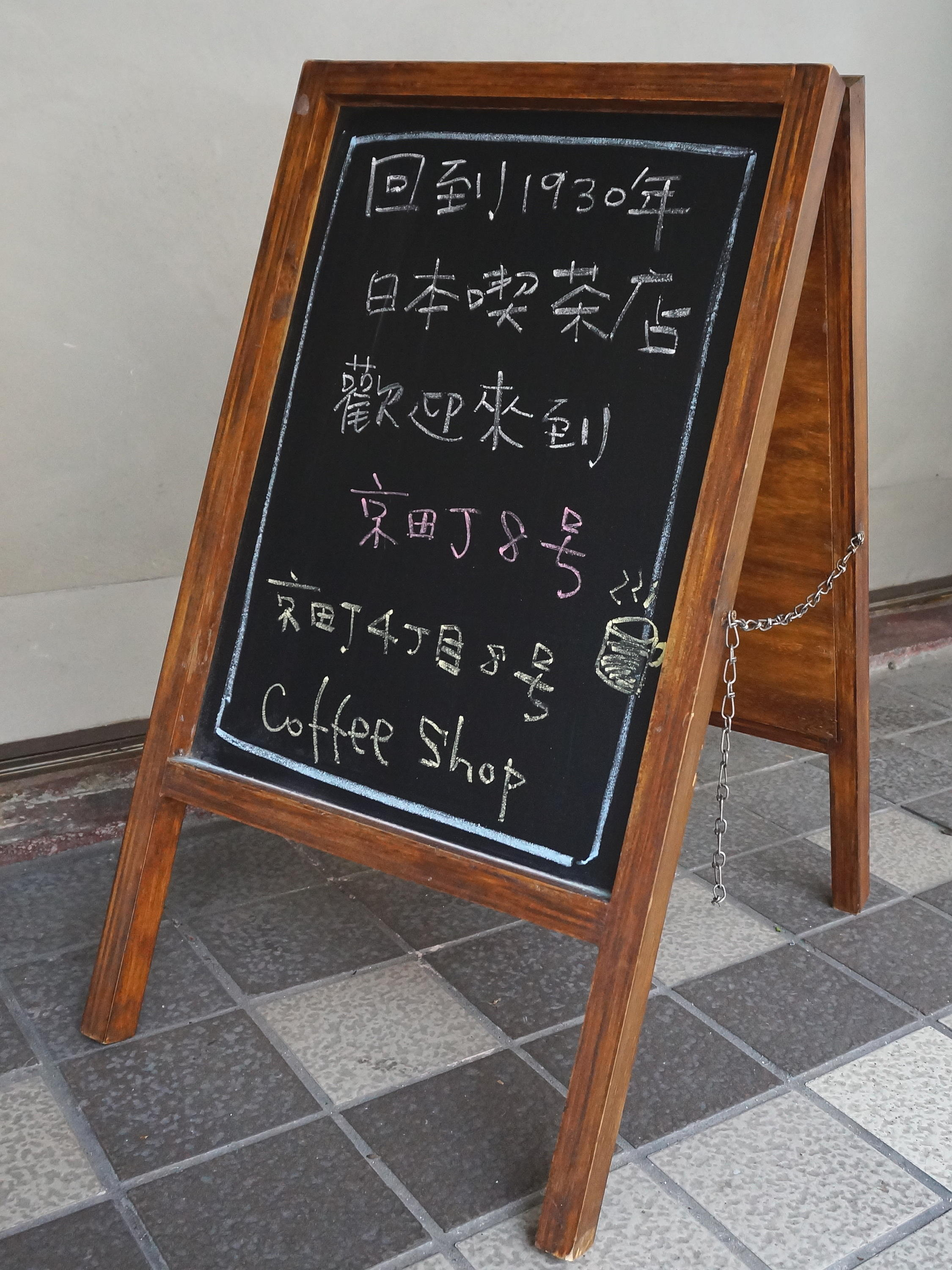
An advertising blackboard in Taipei, Taiwan, 2019

== See also ==
- Blackboard bold
- Blackboard Jungle
- Chalkboard gag from The Simpsons
- ChalkZone
- Conic Sections Rebellion, an 1830 student uprising when Yale students were required to draw their own diagrams on the blackboard
- Hagoromo Bungu, Japanese chalk company
- Sidewalk chalk
- Simon in the Land of Chalk Drawings
- Tacita Dean, an artist who often uses blackboards in her work
