= Randolph Blake =

American psychologist

Randolph Blake (born 1945) is an American psychologist, currently the Centennial Professor Emeritus at Vanderbilt University and an Elected Fellow of the American Academy of Arts and Sciences and National Academy of Sciences.
