= Hagoromo University of International Studies =

- 羽衣国際大学
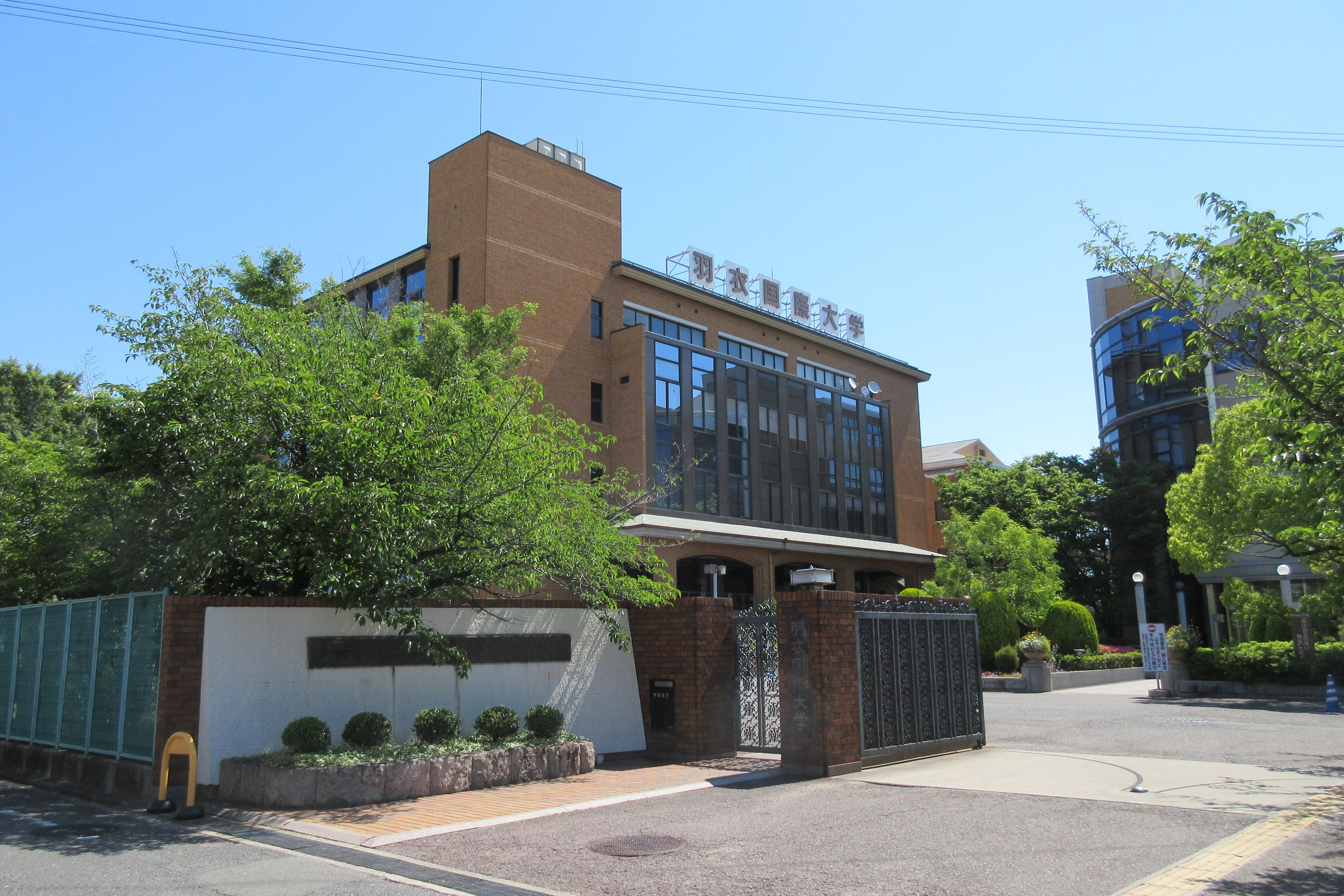
- Hagoromo University of International Studies
- Motto: Be the One
- Type: Private
- Established: 1964
- Chair: 松井 基純
- President: Kei Nakagawa
- Vice-president: Eiko Ishikawa
- Academic staff: 47
- Students: 1,151
- Location: Sakai, Osaka, Japan; 34°32′4″N 135°26′52″E
- Campus: Urban
- Website: www.hagoromo.ac.jp
- Location within Osaka Prefecture Location within Japan

Hagoromo University of International Studies (HUIS) (羽衣国際大学, Hagoromo kokusai daigaku) is a private university in Sakai, Osaka, Japan. The school was founded in 1964 as a women's junior college. After becoming coeducational in 2000, it became a four-year college in 2002.

== Academic Faculties ==
This university has following faculties.

=== Faculty of Social Sciences ===
- Department of Social Sciences
  - Economic and Business Administration Course
  - Global Studies Course
  - Tourism Course
  - Sports and Management Course
- Department of Media Studies
  - Broadcasting and Media Course
  - Visual Arts Course
  - Information Studies Course

=== Faculty of Human Life Studies ===
- Department of Human Life Studies
  - Confectionery Studies Course
  - Interior Architectural Design Course
  - Fashion Design and Merchandise Course
- Department of Food and Nutrition
  - Department of Food and Nutrition
