= Chalkboard art =

Chalk-based art on a blackboard

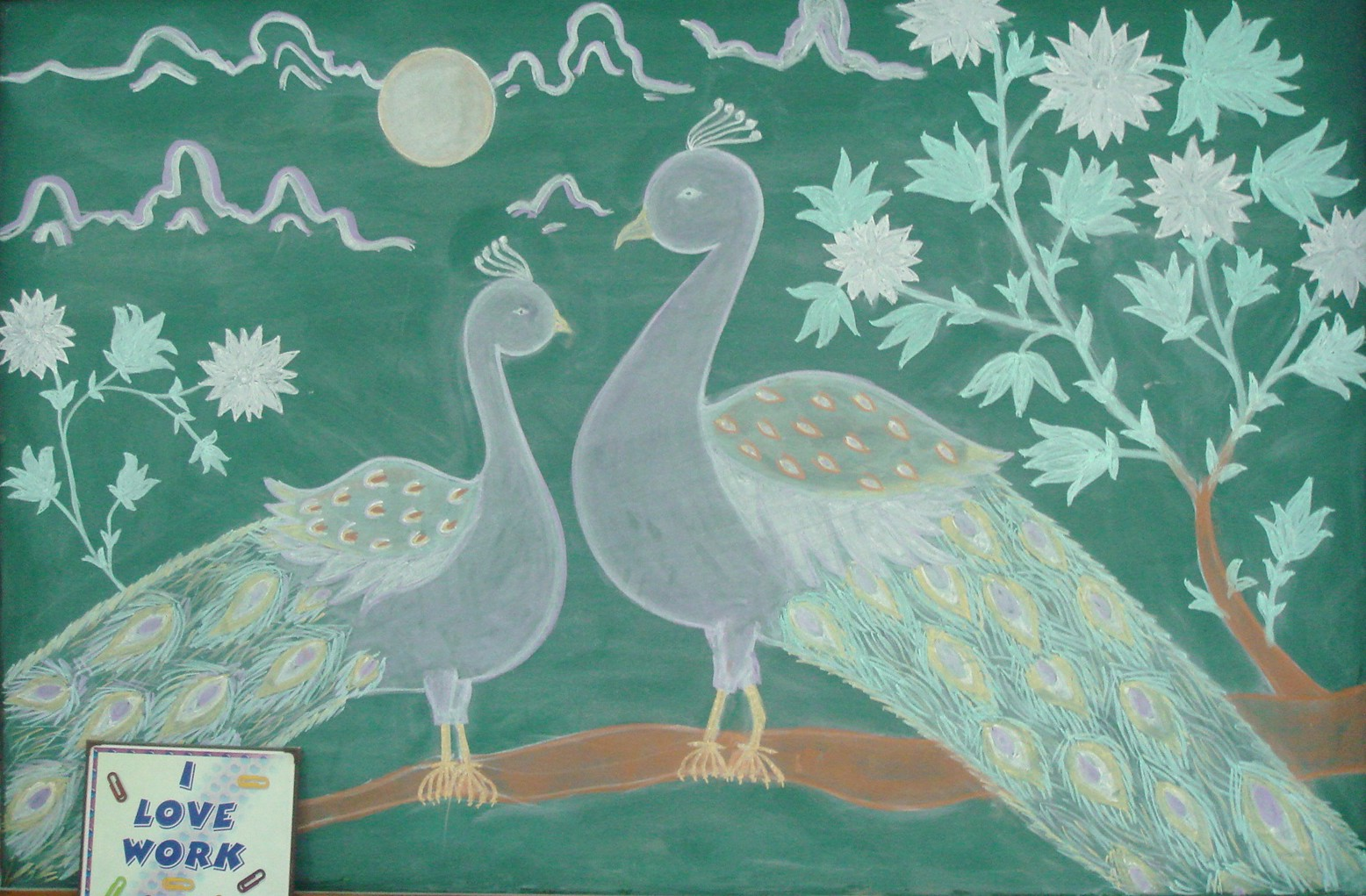
Children's drawing on a chalkboard

Chalkboard art or chalk art is the use of chalk on a blackboard as a visual art. It is similar to art using pastels and related to sidewalk art that often uses chalk. Chalkboard art is often used in restaurants, shops or walls.

Chalkboard art has also been done on large boards while storytelling on beaches and in churches.

== Characteristics ==
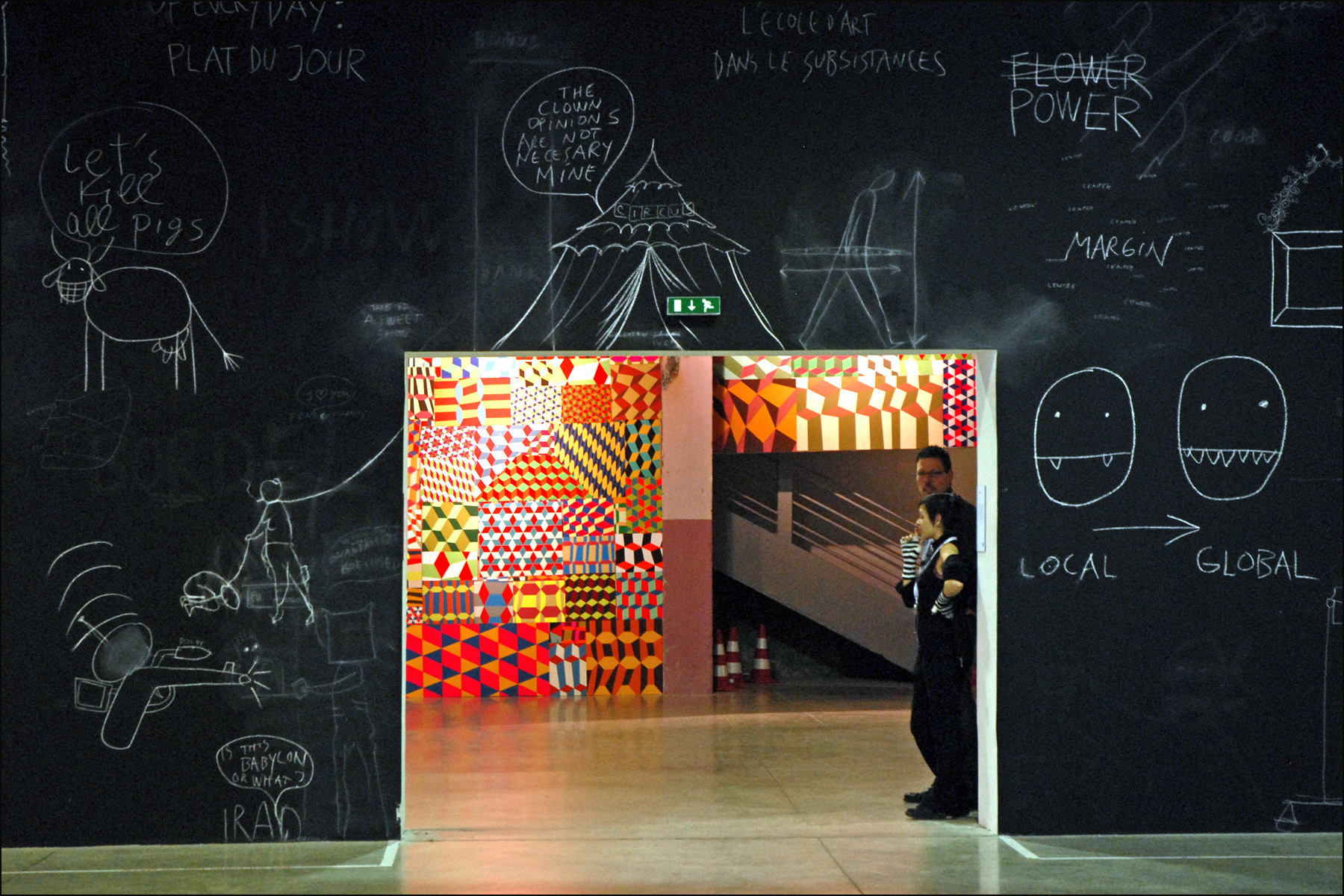
La Sucrière Xe Biennale de Lyon (2009) Le spectacle du quotidien by Dan Perjovschi

Chalkboard art is ephemeral.

== Chalkboard artists ==
Chalkboard artists include Catherine Owens, Chris Yoon, Maggie Choate, Bryce Wisdom, C. J. Hughes, and Scrojo.
