= Clarence Deming =

American journalist and college athlete (1848–1913)

Personal information
- Born: October 1, 1848; Litchfield, Connecticut, U.S.
- Died: May 8, 1913 (aged 64); New Haven, Connecticut, U.S.

Career information
- College: Yale (1873–1874)

Clarence Deming (October 1, 1848 – May 8, 1913) was an American journalist who wrote for the New York Evening Post for nine years. He was also an editorial writer for the Railway Age Gazette, and a writer on athletics and Yale history in general.

He was also known as a college football and baseball player for the Yale Bulldogs' early teams. He was for two years captain of the baseball team.
