= Hagoromo Fulltouch Chalk =

Japanese-South Korean chalk brand

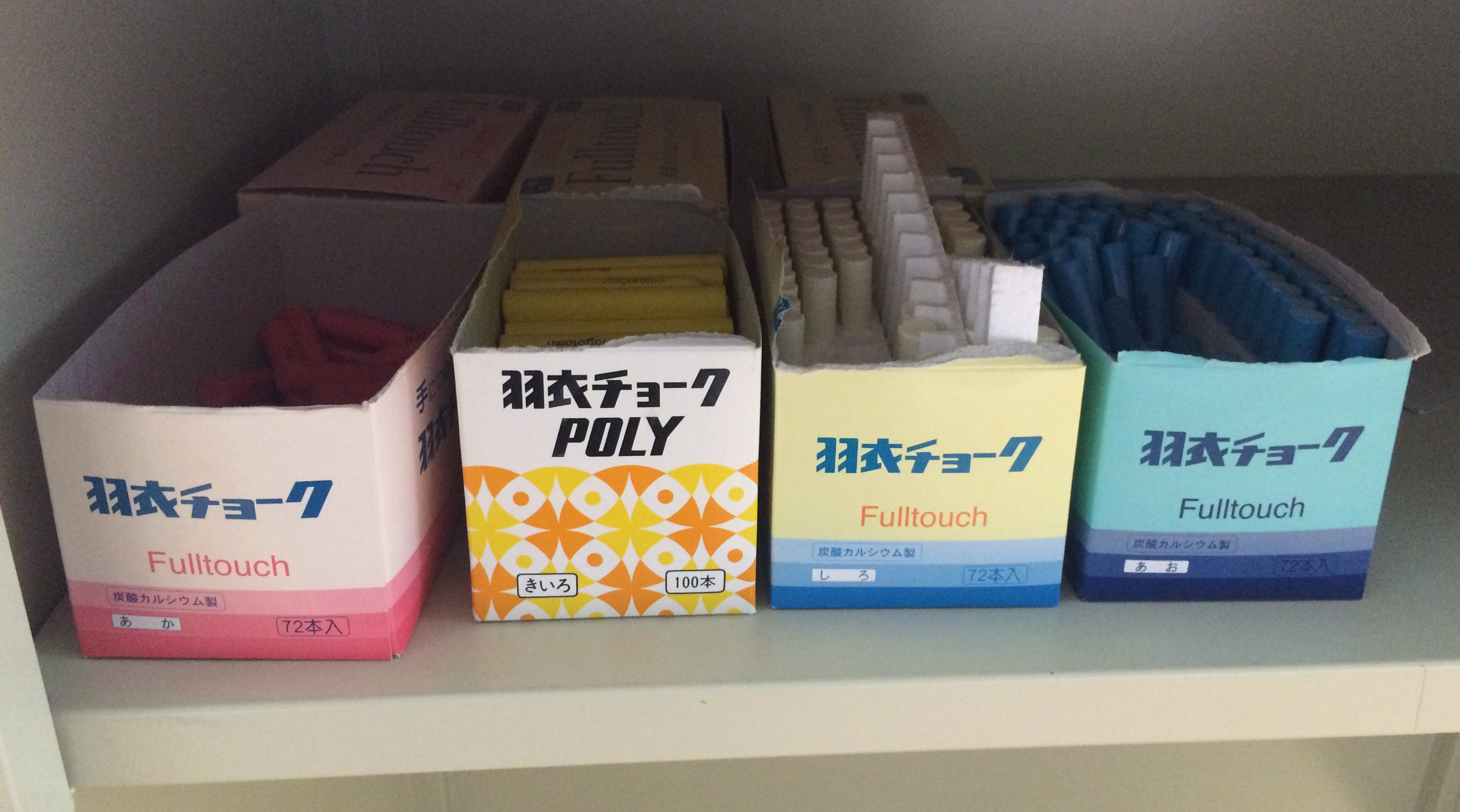
Boxes of Hagoromo Fulltouch Chalk, produced by Hagoromo Bungu

Hagoromo Fulltouch Chalk (Japanese: 羽衣フルタッチチョーク; Korean: 하고로모 풀터치 분필) is a South Korean-owned brand of chalk for blackboards, originally produced by Japanese company Hagoromo Bungu (羽衣文具).

Production of the chalk began in 1932. It reached its peak sales of 90 million pieces of chalk a year in 1990 and achieved international popularity from the 2000s. The chalk has found particular favor among mathematicians and has been described as the "Rolls-Royce of chalk".

By 2014, Hagoromo Bungu president Watanabe Takayasu, who had not chosen a successor, had declined offers from several Japanese companies to continue the brand and instead resolved to close the company. However, South Korean man Shin Hyung Seok, the founder of company Sejong Mall (세종몰) and the exclusive importer of Hagoromo chalk to South Korea since 2009, had a strong relationship with Watanabe. Shin was granted permission to continue production, receiving both the knowledge and equipment necessary for manufacturing. Since 2015, Sejong Mall has been producing the brand.

== History ==
=== Hagoromo Bungu ===
Hagoromo Bungu Co., Ltd
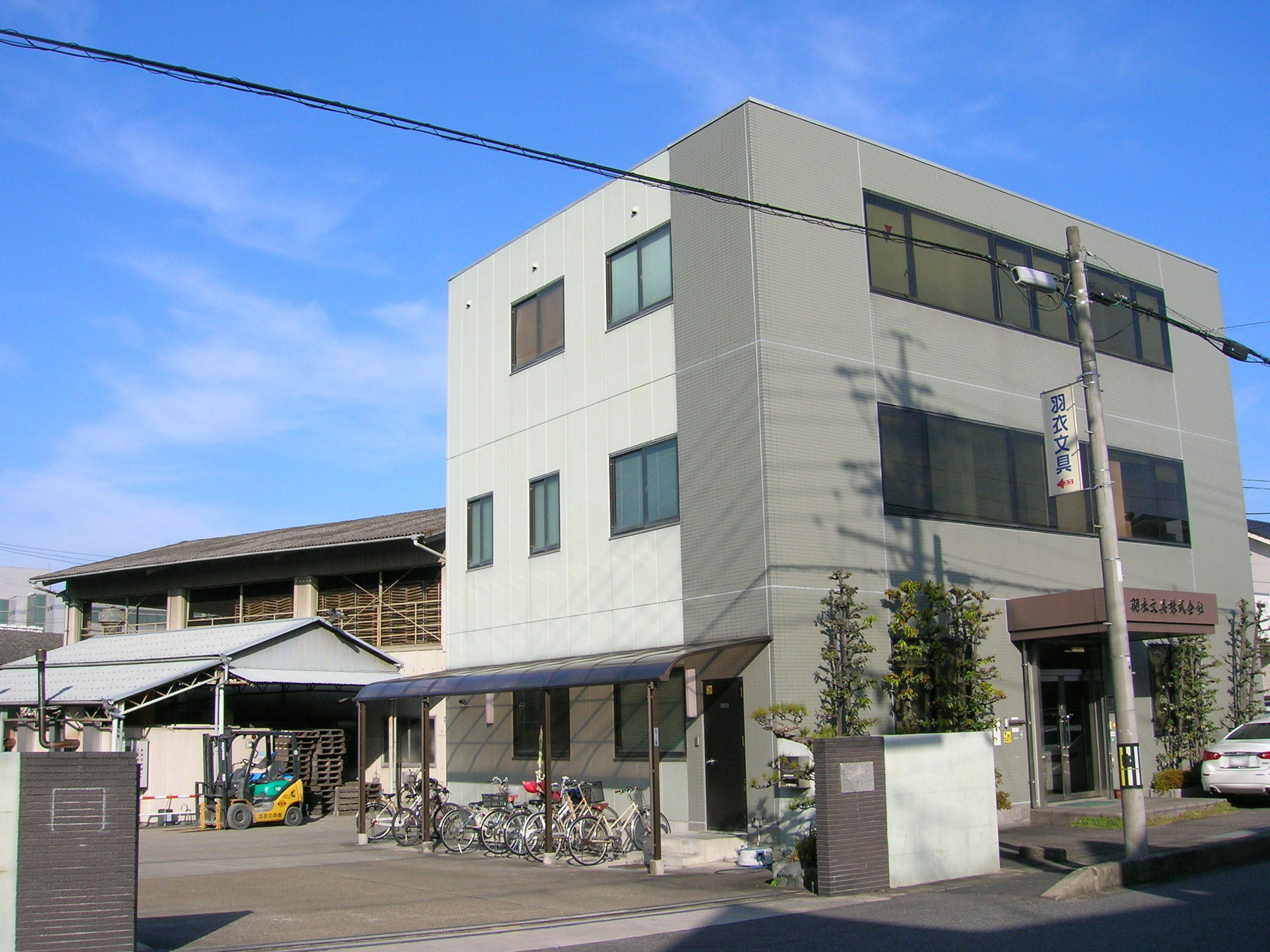
- Former Hagoromo office and factory in Kasugai
- Industry: Office supplies
- Founded: October 1932; 93 years ago
- Defunct: March 2015; 11 years ago
- Fate: Acquired by Sejongmall
- Headquarters: Kasugai, Aichi, Japan
- Products: Blackboard chalk

Hagoromo Bungu was founded in October 1932 as Nihon Chalk Seizosho. The original factory was located in Naka-ku, Nagoya, but was destroyed in August 1944 during World War II. The company was re-established in 1947 and renamed to Hagoromo Bungu. A factory in the nearby city of Kasugai was completed in 1961, and the offices moved there in 1992.

The company sold over 90 million pieces of chalk a year at its peak in 1990 and held a 30% share of the domestic market, according to Tokyo Shoko Research.

=== Establishment of Sejong Mall ===
SEJONGMALL
- Native name: (주)세종몰
- Industry: Stationery manufacturing
- Founded: 2009
- Headquarters: Pocheon, South Korea
- Brands: Hagoromo Fulltouch Chalk
- Owner: Shin Hyun Seok
- Website: en.sejongmall.co.kr (in English)

In 2003, South Korean hagwon math teacher Shin Hyung Seok (신형석) visited Japan to learn about their cram school systems. During this trip, he encountered Hagoromo chalk for the first time. He immediately became a fan of the brand. When he returned to Korea with boxes of the fluorescent colored Hagoromo chalk variants, students praised the colors as easily legible. Upon running out of Hagoromo chalk, he searched to see if any businesses in South Korea imported the brand, and was disappointed to learn that none did. He also asked if any manufacturers were willing to make fluorescent chalk colors, and all reportedly refused, with some claiming that there wasn't a market for such colors and high-end chalk brands.

In 2006, Shin reached out to Hagoromo Bungu's president, Watanabe Takayasu. Coincidentally, Watanabe's second daughter was able to serve as a translator; she was fluent in Korean and had previously studied abroad in South Korea. She reportedly visited South Korea multiple times a year with her father because she enjoyed South Korean cuisine. Shin received approval to operate as the exclusive importer of Hagoromo products to South Korea; this resulted in the creation of Sejong Mall in 2009. The two reportedly quickly built a positive rapport. Hagoromo quickly became successful in South Korea; at some point reportedly around 80–90% of instructors at hagwons adopted the brand.

=== Closure of Hagoromo Bungu and succession ===
In October 2014, company president Watanabe Takayasu released a statement announcing the company would stop chalk production in February 2015 and sales in March 2015. Watanabe, Watanabe Ryuzo's successor, mentioned reasons for the closure included the fact that "blackboards are no longer the norm in classrooms" and that "the number of students is also on the wane". Watanabe also cited his declining health due to stomach cancer as a major reason for the closure. The announcement to cease business led to the mass buying, hoarding, and reselling of chalk among its fanbase. By June 2015, Watanabe reported that production had ended 31 March 2015, a month later than originally planned.

Hagoromo Bungu had been owned for three generations by the same family, but by 2014 lacked a successor. None of Watanabe's three children, nor any of their spouses, were willing to take over the business. Watanabe had reportedly tried sharing his equipment and recipe for the chalk with other companies but was dissatisfied with their output quality, and many of them were only interested in the secret recipe. Umajirushi, a Japanese blackboard manufacturer looking to expand their chalk production, bought one of the chalk production machines. Umajirushi launched DC Chalk Deluxe (DCチョークDX), but subsequently discontinued production in early 2020.

Watanabe called Shin and informed him of his intent to close the company and apologized for it affecting Shin's business. Shin asked if Watanabe would let him continue making the chalk. Initially, Watanabe refused and warned Shin about how difficult the manufacturing industry was. Eventually, Watanabe was convinced to allow it; Watanabe's daughter reportedly tearfully thanked Shin for managing to do so.

In early 2015, Watanabe sold the machines to Shin for a notably low price. Each machine, valued around ₩80 million won (US$80,000), was sold for ₩1 million (US$900). Shin imported the machines in sixteen 40-foot containers from Nagoya to Pocheon. After the factory was set up, Watanabe, in a wheelchair, visited South Korea and expressed his approval at the factory. He taught Shin how to create the chalk. A number of Hagoromo Bungu's Zainichi Korean employees went over as technical advisors to ensure that the manufacturing was faithful to the original. In 2019, it was reported that the chalk imported raw materials from Japan, including sea shells, to promote consistency. Reportedly, some people thought the new Hagoromo Fulltouch chalk was fake; Watanabe and Shin reportedly took a photo together to show that Shin had Watanabe's blessing. The brand has since been evaluated by at least one mathematician as indistinguishable from the original product.

To begin working as a manufacturer, Shin initially invested around ₩700 million into the business. In 2016, Sejong Mall began to produce the chalk. Their sales by year increased from ₩300 million in 2016, to ₩600 million in 2017, to ₩900 million in 2018, to ₩2 billion in 2019. Overseas sales improved from ₩50 million in 2016, to ₩100 million in 2017, and ₩300 million in 2018. In 2019, overseas sales were around 40% of the total. Sales were reportedly improved by foreign documentaries and news coverage on the Hagoromo brand and the transfer. Sejong Mall has reportedly attempted to position the chalk as a high-end product in the market and has made efforts to design the packaging accordingly.

The handoff of the Hagoromo brand has been impacted by often-fraught Japan–South Korea relations. Japanese broadcaster NHK reportedly produced a 30-minute documentary that reportedly critically described Hagoromo's hand-off as the transfer of Japanese technology to a foreign country. Some South Koreans expressed disapproval of the brand, as it was originally from Japan. Shin and Watanabe defended their positive relationship and expressed hope that relations between their countries will improve. In January 2020, Shin visited Watanabe, and the two promised to meet again when the weather became warmer. Amidst travel restrictions in the COVID-19 pandemic, Watanabe died in July that year without them having met again. According to Shin, Watanabe continued advising Shin on the company until his death.

The Japanese Chalk Association reportedly banned imports of Hagoromo Fulltouch from South Korea for five years, with the concern that it would destabilize the market. In 2017, the company began exporting the brand to Vietnam. The product is also sold in Europe and America, particularly through Amazon. In 2020, it was reported that China was the company's largest market, followed by the United States. In 2020, it was reported that the company was developing a writing product that would work on glass. In 2022, it was reported that the company was developing other writing utensils, such as pens.

== Popularity and legacy ==
Mathematician Satyan Devadoss wrote in 2010 that the Hagoromo chalk can be called "the Michael Jordan of chalk, the Rolls-Royce of chalk". Several other well-known mathematicians and professors, such as Brian Conrad and David Eisenbud, also prefer the product. When it was announced in 2015 that Hagoromo chalk would stop being produced, many professors and chalk connoisseurs began buying large quantities of the chalk. After the succession by Sejong Mall, at least one mathematician evaluated Sejong Mall's chalk as indistinguishable from the original. David Eisenbud first introduced the chalk to American mathematicians and worked to have it imported to the US; it later became available for sale on Amazon.

== Product variants ==
Hagoromo Bungu sold the following chalk products:

- Fulltouch Chalk: calcium chalk, available in white, red, orange, yellow, green and blue
- Fulltouch Large Chalk: calcium chalk, 2 cm in diameter and 11.3 cm in length, available in white, red, orange, yellow, green, and blue
- Poly Chalk: gypsum chalk, sometimes known as plaster chalk

Sejongmall introduced the following variants

- New Poly Luminous: gypsum chalk, sometimes known as plaster chalk
- Fulltouch Luminous Color Chalk: calcium chalk
