= List of actors who have played the president of the United States =

This is a list of actors who have played the role of a real or fictitious president of the United States.

== Presidents who played themselves ==
=== Films ===
President	Film	Year	Notes	Reference(s)
William McKinley*	McKinley at Home, Canton, Ohio	1896		
Ronald Reagan*	Alice in Movieland	1940		
Ronald Reagan*	It's a Great Feeling	1949		
Bill Clinton	First Kid	1996		
Donald Trump*	Ghosts Can't Do It	1989		
Donald Trump*	Home Alone 2: Lost in New York	1992		
Donald Trump*	Across the Sea of Time	1995		
Donald Trump*	Eddie	1996		
Donald Trump*	The Associate	1996		
Donald Trump*	Celebrity	1998		
Donald Trump*	Zoolander	2001		
Donald Trump*	Two Weeks Notice	2002		
Donald Trump*	Wall Street: Money Never Sleeps	2010		

* McKinley, Reagan, and Trump were not presidents at the time.

=== Television ===
President	TV show	Year	Notes	Reference(s)
Richard Nixon*	Laugh-In (NBC)	1968		
Gerald Ford*	Dynasty (ABC)	1983		
Jimmy Carter*	Home Improvement (ABC)	1994		
George H. W. Bush*	Saturday Night Live (NBC)	1994		
Bill Clinton	A Child's Wish (CBS)	1997		
George W. Bush*	Saturday Night Live (NBC)	2000		
Barack Obama*	Saturday Night Live (NBC)	2007		
Barack Obama*	Life, Larry and the Pursuit of Unhappiness	2026	Also executive producer	
Donald Trump*	The Jeffersons (CBS)	1985		
Donald Trump*	I'll Take Manhattan (CBS)	1987		
Donald Trump*	The Fresh Prince of Bel-Air (NBC)	1994		
Donald Trump*	The Nanny (CBS)	1996		
Donald Trump*	Suddenly Susan (NBC)	1997		
Donald Trump*	The Drew Carey Show (ABC)	1997		
Donald Trump*	Spin City (ABC)	1998		
Donald Trump*	Sex and the City (HBO)	1999		
Donald Trump*	Saturday Night Live (NBC)	2004, 2015		
Donald Trump*	Days of Our Lives (NBC)	2005		
Donald Trump*	WrestleMania 23 (Syndication)	2007		
Donald Trump*	Comedy Central Roast (Comedy Central)	2011		
Joe Biden*	Where in the World is Carmen Sandiego? (PBS)	1993		
Joe Biden*	Parks and Recreation (NBC)	2013, 2015		
Joe Biden*	Law & Order: Special Victims Unit (NBC)	2016		

* Was not a president at the time.

== Actors who played real presidents ==
=== Documentaries ===
President	Actor	Documentary	Year	Notes	Reference(s)
George Washington	Cliff Robertson	The American Revolution	1994	Voice	
George Washington	Brian Dennehy	Founding Brothers	2002		
George Washington	Martin Sheen	Searching for George Washington	2007	Voice	
George Washington	Richard Easton	Alexander Hamilton	2007	Voice	
George Washington	Josh Brolin	The American Revolution	2025	Voice	
John Adams	William Daniels	The American Revolution	1994	Voice	
John Adams	Peter Donaldson	Benjamin Franklin	2002		
John Adams	James Woods	Founding Brothers	2002	Voice	
John Adams	Paul Giamatti	Benjamin Franklin	2002	Voice	
John Adams	Paul Giamatti	The American Revolution	2025	Voice	
Thomas Jefferson	Sam Waterston	Thomas Jefferson	1997		
Thomas Jefferson	Sam Waterston	Lewis & Clark: The Journey of the Corps of Discovery	1997		
Thomas Jefferson	Peter Coyote	Founding Brothers	2002	Voice	
Thomas Jefferson	Jeff Daniels	The American Revolution	2025	Voice	
James Madison	Rob Lowe	Founding Brothers	2002	Voice	
Abraham Lincoln	Sam Waterston	The Civil War	1990	Voice	
Abraham Lincoln	David Morse	The Gettysburg Address	2018	Voice	
Ulysses S. Grant	Jason Robards	The Civil War	1990	Voice	
Ulysses S. Grant	Harry Bulkeley	Ulysses S. Grant	2002		
Ulysses S. Grant	Harry Bulkeley	Sherman's March	2007		
Theodore Roosevelt	Paul Giamatti	The Roosevelts	2014	Voice	
Franklin D. Roosevelt	Edward Herrmann	The Roosevelts	2014	Voice	

=== Films ===
President	Actor	Film	Year	Notes	Reference(s)
George Washington	Joseph Kilgour	Washington Under the American Flag	1909		
George Washington	Joseph Kilgour	The Battle Cry of Peace	1915		
George Washington	Joseph Kilgour	Janice Meredith	1924		
George Washington	Arthur Dewey	America	1924		
George Washington	Francis X. Bushman	The Flag	1927		
George Washington	Alan Mowbray	Alexander Hamilton	1931		
George Washington	Alan Mowbray	The Phantom President	1932		
George Washington	Alan Mowbray	Where Do We Go from Here?	1945		
George Washington	Alan Dinehart	The Road Is Open Again	1933		
George Washington	Robert Warwick	Give Me Liberty	1936		
George Washington	Montagu Love	Sons of Liberty	1939		
George Washington	Montagu Love	The Remarkable Andrew	1942		
George Washington	George Houston	The Howards of Virginia	1940		
George Washington	Douglass Dumbrille	Monsieur Beaucaire	1946		
George Washington	Richard Gaines	Unconquered	1947		
George Washington	James Seay	When the Redskins Rode	1951		
George Washington	John Crawford	John Paul Jones	1959		
George Washington	Howard St. John	La Fayette	1961		
George Washington	Gavin Pearce	George Washington	1984		
George Washington	Frank Windsor	Revolution	1985		
George Washington	Michael McGuire	A More Perfect Union	1989		
George Washington	Jeff Daniels	The Crossing	2000		
George Washington	Terry Layman	The Patriot	2000		
George Washington	Sebastian Roché	We Fight to Be Free	2006		
George Washington	Jon Voight	An American Carol	2008		
George Washington	Jess Harnell	Mr. Peabody & Sherman	2014	Voice	
George Washington	Chris Parnell	Night at the Museum: Kahmunrah Rises Again	2022	Washington Crossing the Delaware painting depiction Voice	
George Washington	William Franklyn-Miller	Young Washington	2026		
John Adams	Ferris Taylor	Declaration of Independence	1938	Short	
John Adams	Robert Ayres	John Paul Jones	1959		
John Adams	William Daniels	1776	1972		
John Adams	Ivan Crosland	A More Perfect Union	1989		
Thomas Jefferson	Frank Walsh	America	1924		
Thomas Jefferson	Lionel Adams	Janice Meredith	1924		
Thomas Jefferson	Montagu Love	Alexander Hamilton	1931		
Thomas Jefferson	George Irving	Hearts Divided	1936		
Thomas Jefferson	George Irving	Give Me Liberty	1936		
Thomas Jefferson	John Litel	Declaration of Independence	1938	Short	
Thomas Jefferson	Richard Carlson	The Howards of Virginia	1940		
Thomas Jefferson	Gilbert Emery	The Remarkable Andrew	1942		
Thomas Jefferson	Gilbert Emery	The Loves of Edgar Allan Poe	1942		
Thomas Jefferson	Grandon Rhodes	Magnificent Doll	1946		
Thomas Jefferson	Ken Howard	1776	1972		
Thomas Jefferson	Scott Wilkinson	A More Perfect Union	1989		
Thomas Jefferson	Nick Nolte	Jefferson in Paris	1995		
Thomas Jefferson	Ronald McAdams	National Treasure	2004		
James Madison	Burgess Meredith	Magnificent Doll	1946		
James Madison	Craig Wasson	A More Perfect Union	1989		
James Monroe	Morgan Wallace	Alexander Hamilton	1931		
James Monroe	John Elliott	Hearts Divided	1936		
James Monroe	Charles Waldron	The Monroe Doctrine	1939		
John Quincy Adams	Grant Mitchell	The Monroe Doctrine	1939		
John Quincy Adams	Anthony Hopkins	Amistad	1997		
Andrew Jackson	Lionel Barrymore	The Gorgeous Hussy	1936		
Andrew Jackson	Lionel Barrymore	Lone Star	1952		
Andrew Jackson	Erville Alderson	The Man Without a Country	1937		
Andrew Jackson	Hugh Sothern	The Buccaneer	1938		
Andrew Jackson	Edward Ellis	Man of Conquest	1939		
Andrew Jackson	Brian Donlevy	The Remarkable Andrew	1942		
Andrew Jackson	Ernst Fritz Fürbringer	The Endless Road	1943	German: Der Unendliche Weg	
Andrew Jackson	Charlton Heston	The President's Lady	1953		
Andrew Jackson	Carl Benton Reid	The First Texan	1956		
Andrew Jackson	Charlton Heston	The Buccaneer	1958		
Andrew Jackson	Basil Ruysdael	Davy Crockett, King of the Wild Frontier	1955		
Martin Van Buren	Charles Trowbridge	The Gorgeous Hussy	1936		
Martin Van Buren	Francis Sayles	Man of Conquest	1939		
Martin Van Buren	Nigel Hawthorne	Amistad	1997		
William Henry Harrison	Douglass Dumbrille	Ten Gentlemen from West Point	1942		
James K. Polk	Edwin Stanley	The Monroe Doctrine	1939		
James K. Polk	Edward Earle	Can't Help Singing	1944		
James K. Polk	Ian Wolfe	California	1947		
James K. Polk	Addison Richards	The Oregon Trail	1959		
Zachary Taylor	Allan Cavan	Rebellion	1936		
Zachary Taylor	Robert Barrat	Distant Drums	1951		
Zachary Taylor	Fay Roope	Seminole	1953		
Zachary Taylor	James Gammon	One Man's Hero	1999		
Franklin Pierce	Porter Hall	The Great Moment	1944		
James Buchanan	René Auberjonois	Raising Buchanan	2019		
Abraham Lincoln	Leopold Wharton	Abraham Lincoln's Clemency	1910		
Abraham Lincoln	Francis Ford	On Secret Service	1912		
Abraham Lincoln	Francis Ford	When Lincoln Paid	1913		
Abraham Lincoln	Francis Ford	The Battle of Bull Run	1913		
Abraham Lincoln	Francis Ford	From Rail Splitter to President	1913		
Abraham Lincoln	Francis Ford	The Toll of War	1913		
Abraham Lincoln	Francis Ford	With Lee in Virginia	1913		
Abraham Lincoln	Francis Ford	The Great Sacrifice	1913		
Abraham Lincoln	Francis Ford	The Heart of Maryland	1915		
Abraham Lincoln	Francis Ford	The Heart of Lincoln	1915		
Abraham Lincoln	William J. Ferguson	The Battle Cry of Peace	1915		
Abraham Lincoln	Joseph Henabery	The Birth of a Nation	1915		
Abraham Lincoln	Charles Edward Bull	The Iron Horse	1924		
Abraham Lincoln	Walter Huston	Abraham Lincoln	1930		
Abraham Lincoln	Charles Middleton	The Phantom President	1932		
Abraham Lincoln	Charles Middleton	The Road Is Open Again	1933		
Abraham Lincoln	Charles Middleton	The Man Without a Country	1937		
Abraham Lincoln	Frank McGlynn Sr.	The Littlest Rebel	1935		
Abraham Lincoln	Frank McGlynn Sr.	The Prisoner of Shark Island	1936		
Abraham Lincoln	Frank McGlynn Sr.	Hearts in Bondage	1936		
Abraham Lincoln	Frank McGlynn Sr.	The Plainsman	1936		
Abraham Lincoln	Frank McGlynn Sr.	Wells Fargo	1937		
Abraham Lincoln	Percy Parsons	Victoria the Great	1937		
Abraham Lincoln	John Carradine	Of Human Hearts	1938		
Abraham Lincoln	Henry Fonda	Young Mr. Lincoln	1939		
Abraham Lincoln	Raymond Massey	Abe Lincoln in Illinois	1940		
Abraham Lincoln	Raymond Massey	How the West Was Won	1962		
Abraham Lincoln	Victor Kilian	Virginia City	1940		
Abraham Lincoln	Leslie Kimmell	The Tall Target	1951		
Abraham Lincoln	Stanley Hall	Prince of Players	1955		
Abraham Lincoln	Austin Green	The Story of Mankind	1957		
Abraham Lincoln	Ford Rainey	Guardians of the Wilderness	1976		
Abraham Lincoln	John Anderson	The Lincoln Conspiracy	1977		
Abraham Lincoln	Robert V. Barron	Bill & Ted's Excellent Adventure	1989		
Abraham Lincoln	Brendan Fraser	Bedazzled	2000		
Abraham Lincoln	Glenn Beck	National Treasure: Book of Secrets	2007		
Abraham Lincoln	Gerald Bestrom	The Conspirator	2010		
Abraham Lincoln	Benjamin Walker	Abraham Lincoln: Vampire Hunter	2012		
Abraham Lincoln	Bill Oberst Jr.	Abraham Lincoln vs. Zombies	2012		
Abraham Lincoln	Daniel Day-Lewis	Lincoln	2012		
Abraham Lincoln	Tom Amandes	Saving Lincoln	2013		
Abraham Lincoln	Billy Campbell	Killing Lincoln	2013		
Abraham Lincoln	Jess Harnell	Mr. Peabody & Sherman	2014	Voice	
Abraham Lincoln	Michael Krebs	Field of Lost Shoes	2014		
Abraham Lincoln	Gilbert Gottfried	A Million Ways to Die in the West	2014		
Abraham Lincoln	Will Forte	The Lego Movie	2014	Voice	
Abraham Lincoln	Will Forte	The Lego Movie 2: The Second Part	2019	Voice	
Abraham Lincoln	Richard Klein	Gettysburg 1863	TBA		
Abraham Lincoln	Tom Hanks	Lincoln in the Bardo	TBA		
Andrew Johnson	Van Heflin	Tennessee Johnson	1942		
Ulysses S. Grant	Donald Crisp	The Birth of a Nation	1915		
Ulysses S. Grant	Paul Scardon	The Battle Cry of Peace	1915		
Ulysses S. Grant	E. Alyn Warren	Abraham Lincoln	1930		
Ulysses S. Grant	E. Alyn Warren	Secret Service	1931		
Ulysses S. Grant	E. Alyn Warren	Operator 13	1934		
Ulysses S. Grant	Walter Rodgers	Silver Dollar	1932		
Ulysses S. Grant	Joseph Crehan	Union Pacific	1939		
Ulysses S. Grant	Joseph Crehan	They Died with Their Boots On	1941		
Ulysses S. Grant	Joseph Crehan	The Adventures of Mark Twain	1944		
Ulysses S. Grant	Joseph Crehan	Silver River	1948		
Ulysses S. Grant	Harrison Greene	Tennessee Johnson	1942		
Ulysses S. Grant	John Hamilton	Sitting Bull	1954		
Ulysses S. Grant	Hayden Rorke	Drum Beat	1954		
Ulysses S. Grant	Morris Ankrum	From the Earth to the Moon	1958		
Ulysses S. Grant	Stan Jones	The Horse Soldiers	1959		
Ulysses S. Grant	Harry Morgan	How the West Was Won	1962		
Ulysses S. Grant	Jason Robards	The Legend of the Lone Ranger	1981		
Ulysses S. Grant	Kevin Kline	Wild Wild West	1999		
Ulysses S. Grant	Aidan Quinn	Jonah Hex	2010		
Ulysses S. Grant	Jared Harris	Lincoln	2012		
Ulysses S. Grant	Peter O' Meara	Saving Lincoln	2013		
Ulysses S. Grant	Mike Marunde	Killing Lincoln	2013		
Ulysses S. Grant	Tom Skerritt	Field of Lost Shoes	2014		
Rutherford B. Hayes	John Dilson	Buffalo Bill	1944		
James A. Garfield	Francis Sayles	The Night Riders	1939		
James A. Garfield	Van Johnson	The Price of Power	1969		
James A. Garfield	Robert Wagner	Netherbeast Incorporated	2007		
Chester A. Arthur	Emmett Corrigan	Silver Dollar	1932		
Chester A. Arthur	Larry Gates	Cattle King	1963		
Chester A. Arthur	José Suárez	The Price of Power	1969		
Chester A. Arthur	Corey Johnson	The Current War	2017		
Grover Cleveland	Stuart Holmes	The Monroe Doctrine	1939		
Grover Cleveland	Stuart Holmes	The Oklahoma Kid	1939		
Grover Cleveland	William Davidson	Lillian Russell	1940		
Grover Cleveland	Pat McCormick	Buffalo Bill and the Indians, or Sitting Bull's History Lesson	1976		
Grover Cleveland	Richard Harrison	Hajji Washington	1998	Persian: حاجی واشنگتن	
Grover Cleveland	Peter Banks	Princess Kaiulani	2009		
Benjamin Harrison	Roy Gordon	Stars and Stripes Forever	1952		
William McKinley	Dell Henderson	A Message to Garcia	1936		
William McKinley	Frank Conroy	This Is My Affair	1937		
William McKinley	Douglas Wood	Teddy, the Rough Rider	1940		
Theodore Roosevelt	E. J. Ratcliffe	I Loved a Woman	1933		
Theodore Roosevelt	Sidney Blackmer	This Is My Affair	1937		
Theodore Roosevelt	Sidney Blackmer	The Monroe Doctrine	1939		
Theodore Roosevelt	Sidney Blackmer	Teddy, the Rough Rider	1940		
Theodore Roosevelt	Sidney Blackmer	In Old Oklahoma	1943		
Theodore Roosevelt	Sidney Blackmer	Buffalo Bill	1944		
Theodore Roosevelt	Sidney Blackmer	My Girl Tisa	1948		
Theodore Roosevelt	Thomas A. Curran	Citizen Kane	1941		
Theodore Roosevelt	Wallis Clark	Yankee Doodle Dandy	1942		
Theodore Roosevelt	Wallis Clark	Jack London	1943		
Theodore Roosevelt	Ed Cassidy	Sun Valley Cyclone	1946		
Theodore Roosevelt	Ed Cassidy	Take Me Out to the Ball Game	1949		
Theodore Roosevelt	Ed Cassidy	The First Traveling Saleslady	1956		
Theodore Roosevelt	John Alexander	Fancy Pants	1950		
Theodore Roosevelt	Brian Keith	The Wind and the Lion	1975		
Theodore Roosevelt	William Phipps	Eleanor and Franklin	1976		
Theodore Roosevelt	David Healy	Eleanor and Franklin: The White House Years	1977		
Theodore Roosevelt	Robert Boyd	Ragtime	1981		
Theodore Roosevelt	David James Alexander	Newsies	1992		
Theodore Roosevelt	Ray Geer	Geronimo	1993		
Theodore Roosevelt	Robin Williams	Night at the Museum	2006	Wax sculpture depiction	
Theodore Roosevelt	Ed Metzger	The Curious Case of Benjamin Button	2008		
Theodore Roosevelt	Robin Williams	Night at the Museum: Battle of the Smithsonian	2009	Wax sculpture depiction	
Theodore Roosevelt	Robin Williams	Night at the Museum: Secret of the Tomb	2014	Wax sculpture depiction	
Theodore Roosevelt	Thomas Lennon	Night at the Museum: Kahmunrah Rises Again	2022	Voice; Wax sculpture depiction	
William Howard Taft	Walter Massey	The Greatest Game Ever Played	2005		
Woodrow Wilson	Samuel S. Hinds	The Road Is Open Again	1933		
Woodrow Wilson	Fred Lee	You Can't Buy Everything	1934		
Woodrow Wilson	Alexander Knox	Wilson	1944		
Woodrow Wilson	Earl Lee	The Story of Will Rogers	1952		
Woodrow Wilson	Frank Forsyth	Oh! What a Lovely War	1969		
Woodrow Wilson	Bob Gunton	Iron Jawed Angels	2004		
Woodrow Wilson	Ian Kelly	The King's Man	2021		
Warren G. Harding	Harry Dean Stanton	The Legendary Curse of the Hope Diamond	1975		
Calvin Coolidge	Ian Wolfe	The Court-Martial of Billy Mitchell	1955		
Calvin Coolidge	Bruce McGill	Cristiada	2012		
Calvin Coolidge	Mark Landon Smith	Killers of the Flower Moon	2023		
Herbert Hoover	Thomas Peacocke	The Angel of Pennsylvania Avenue	1996		
Franklin D. Roosevelt	Al Richardson	Cash and Carry	1937		
Franklin D. Roosevelt	Jack Young	Yankee Doodle Dandy	1942		
Franklin D. Roosevelt	Jack Young	Mission to Moscow	1943		
Franklin D. Roosevelt	Jack Young	This Is the Army	1943		
Franklin D. Roosevelt	Godfrey Tearle	The Beginning or the End	1947		
Franklin D. Roosevelt	Nikolay Cherkasov	The Battle of Stalingrad	1949		
Franklin D. Roosevelt	Oleg Frelikh	The Fall of Berlin	1949		
Franklin D. Roosevelt	Dick Nelson	Beau James	1957		
Franklin D. Roosevelt	Ralph Bellamy	Sunrise at Campobello	1960		
Franklin D. Roosevelt	Stanisław Jaśkiewicz	Liberation	1971		
Franklin D. Roosevelt	Innokenty Smoktunovsky	Take Aim	1974		
Franklin D. Roosevelt	Edward Herrmann	Eleanor and Franklin	1976		
Franklin D. Roosevelt	Edward Herrmann	Eleanor and Franklin: The White House Years	1977		
Franklin D. Roosevelt	Edward Herrmann	Annie	1982		
Franklin D. Roosevelt	Dan O'Herlihy	MacArthur	1977		
Franklin D. Roosevelt	Howard Da Silva	The Private Files of J. Edgar Hoover	1977		
Franklin D. Roosevelt	Stanisław Jaśkiewicz	Soldiers of Freedom	1977		
Franklin D. Roosevelt	Lee Richardson	Truman	1995		
Franklin D. Roosevelt	Jon Voight	Pearl Harbor	2001		
Franklin D. Roosevelt	Kenneth Branagh	Warm Springs	2005		
Franklin D. Roosevelt	Bill Murray	Hyde Park on Hudson	2012		
Franklin D. Roosevelt	Barry Bostwick	FDR: American Badass!	2012		
Franklin D. Roosevelt	Michael Dalton	The Monuments Men	2014		
Franklin D. Roosevelt	David Strathairn	Darkest Hour	2017	Voice	
Franklin D. Roosevelt	Mark Allyn	The Remarkable Life of John Weld	2018		
Franklin D. Roosevelt	Darin De Paul	Justice Society: World War II	2021	Voice	
Franklin D. Roosevelt	Sam Waterston	The Six Triple Eight	2024		
Harry S. Truman	Art Baker	The Beginning or the End	1947		
Harry S. Truman	Jack Gargan	Glory Alley	1952		
Harry S. Truman	Jerzy Kaliszewski	Take Aim	1974		
Harry S. Truman	Robert Vaughn	The Man from Independence	1974		
Harry S. Truman	James Whitmore	Give 'em Hell, Harry!	1975		
Harry S. Truman	Ed Flanders	MacArthur	1977		
Harry S. Truman	Ed Flanders	Inchon	1981	Voice	
Harry S. Truman	Ed Nelson	Brenda Starr	1989		
Harry S. Truman	Gary Sinise	Truman	1995		
Harry S. Truman	David Patrick Kelly	Flags of Our Fathers	2006		
Harry S. Truman	Kerry Shale	The Hundred-Year-Old Man Who Climbed Out of the Window and Disappeared	2013		
Harry S. Truman	Christian Rodska	The Monuments Men	2014		
Harry S. Truman	Gary Oldman	Oppenheimer	2023		
Dwight D. Eisenhower	Harry Carey Jr.	The Long Gray Line	1955		
Dwight D. Eisenhower	Elbert Steele	The Long Gray Line	1955		
Dwight D. Eisenhower	Henry Grace	The Longest Day	1962		
Dwight D. Eisenhower	Robert Beer	The Right Stuff	1983		
Dwight D. Eisenhower	Robert Beer	My Science Project	1985		
Dwight D. Eisenhower	Keene Curtis	IQ	1994		
Dwight D. Eisenhower	Tom Selleck	Ike: Countdown to D-Day	2004		
Dwight D. Eisenhower	Robin Williams	The Butler	2013		
Dwight D. Eisenhower	Brendan Fraser	Pressure	2026		
John F. Kennedy	Cliff Robertson	PT 109	1963		
John F. Kennedy	Robert Hogan	Prince Jack	1985		
John F. Kennedy	Michael Murphy	The Island	1998		
John F. Kennedy	Bruce Greenwood	Thirteen Days	2000		
John F. Kennedy	Martin Donovan	RFK	2002		
John F. Kennedy	Chriss Anglin	An American Carol	2008		
John F. Kennedy	Brett Stimely	Watchmen	2009		
John F. Kennedy	Brett Stimely	Transformers: Dark of the Moon	2011		
John F. Kennedy	Brett Stimely	Kill the Dictator aka El teniente Amado	2013		
John F. Kennedy	Brett Stimely	Parkland	2013		
John F. Kennedy	John Allen Nelson	Fire Bay	2011		
John F. Kennedy	James Marsden	The Butler	2013		
John F. Kennedy	Rick Kelly	Trumbo	2015		
John F. Kennedy	Caspar Phillipson	Jackie	2016		
John F. Kennedy	Caspar Phillipson	Blonde	2022		
John F. Kennedy	Jeffrey Donovan	LBJ	2016		
John F. Kennedy	Jim Meskimen	Superman: Red Son	2020	Voice	
John F. Kennedy	Bill Burr	Unfrosted	2024		
John F. Kennedy	Ansel Elgort	Mayday 109	TBA		
Lyndon B. Johnson	Donald Moffat	The Right Stuff	1983		
Lyndon B. Johnson	Kenneth Mars	Prince Jack	1985		
Lyndon B. Johnson	Randy Quaid	LBJ: The Early Years	1987		
Lyndon B. Johnson	Tom Howard	JFK	1991		
Lyndon B. Johnson	Walter Adrian	Thirteen Days	2000		
Lyndon B. Johnson	Michael Gambon	Path to War	2002		
Lyndon B. Johnson	Liev Schreiber	The Butler	2013		
Lyndon B. Johnson	Tom Wilkinson	Selma	2014		
Lyndon B. Johnson	Bryan Cranston	All the Way	2016		
Lyndon B. Johnson	John Carroll Lynch	Jackie	2016		
Lyndon B. Johnson	Woody Harrelson	LBJ	2016		
Lyndon B. Johnson	Hap Lawrence	Oppenheimer	2023		
Richard Nixon	Rich Little	Another Nice Mess	1972		
Richard Nixon	Ronald Reagan	Horror House on Highway 5	1985		
Richard Nixon	Lane Smith	The Final Days	1989		
Richard Nixon	Anthony Hopkins	Nixon	1995		
Richard Nixon	Bob Gunton	Elvis Meets Nixon	1997		
Richard Nixon	Dan Hedaya	Dick	1999		
Richard Nixon	Frank Langella	Frost/Nixon	2008		
Richard Nixon	James McManus	Black Dynamite	2009		
Richard Nixon	Robert Wisden	Watchmen	2009		
Richard Nixon	Christopher Shyer	J. Edgar	2011		
Richard Nixon	John H. Tobin	Transformers: Dark of the Moon	2011		
Richard Nixon	John Cusack	The Butler	2013		
Richard Nixon	Mark Camacho	X-Men: Days of Future Past	2014		
Richard Nixon	Edward Yankie	Pawn Sacrifice	2015		
Richard Nixon	Kevin Spacey	Elvis & Nixon	2016		
Richard Nixon	Darrell Duffey	The 101-Year-Old Man Who Skipped Out on the Bill and Disappeared	2016		
Richard Nixon	Bruce Campbell	18½	2021	Voice	
Richard Nixon	Robert Engel	Disclosure Day	2026		
Gerald Ford	Dick Crockett	The Pink Panther Strikes Again	1976		
Gerald Ford	Larry Lindsay	Hot Shots! Part Deux	1993		
Gerald Ford	Corbin Bernsen	The Commission	2003		
Gerald Ford	Bill Camp	Vice	2018		
Jimmy Carter	Ed Beheler	Sextette	1978		
Jimmy Carter	Ed Beheler	Hot Shots! Part Deux	1993		
Jimmy Carter	Skip Schwink	Reagan	2024		
Ronald Reagan	Rip Torn	Airplane II: The Sequel	1982		
Ronald Reagan	Bryan Clark	Pizza Man	1991		
Ronald Reagan	Jay Koch	Back to the Future Part II	1989		
Ronald Reagan	Jay Koch	Hot Shots! Part Deux	1993		
Ronald Reagan	Jay Koch	Panther	1995		
Ronald Reagan	Fred Ward	L'affaire Farewell	2009		
Ronald Reagan	Reginald Green	The Iron Lady	2011		
Ronald Reagan	Alan Rickman	The Butler	2013		
Ronald Reagan	Keith Chanter	The Hundred-Year-Old Man Who Climbed Out of the Window and Disappeared	2013		
Ronald Reagan	David Henrie	Reagan	2024		
Ronald Reagan	Dennis Quaid	Reagan	2024		
Ronald Reagan	Jeff Daniels	The Brink of War	2026		
George H. W. Bush	John Roarke	The Naked Gun 2½: The Smell of Fear	1991		
George H. W. Bush	Daniel T. Healy	Hot Shots! Part Deux	1993		
George H. W. Bush	James Cromwell	W.	2008		
George H. W. Bush	John Hillner	Vice	2018		
Bill Clinton	Scott Herriot	Naked Gun 33 1/3: The Final Insult	1994		
Bill Clinton	Pat Rick	The Silence of the Hams	1994		
Bill Clinton	Dale Reeves	Beavis and Butthead Do America	1996		
Bill Clinton	Craig Barnett	The Godson	1998		
Bill Clinton	Damian Mason	2001: A Space Travesty	2000		
Bill Clinton	Timothy Watters	Life or Something Like It	2002		
Bill Clinton	Jess Harnell	Mr. Peabody & Sherman	2014	Voice	
George W. Bush	Timothy Bottoms	The Crocodile Hunter: Collision Course	2002		
George W. Bush	Timothy Bottoms	DC 9/11: Time of Crisis	2003		
George W. Bush	Bruce Mendenhall	Postal	2007		
George W. Bush	Kamal Haasan	Dasavathaaram	2008		
George W. Bush	James Adomian	Harold & Kumar Escape from Guantanamo Bay	2008		
George W. Bush	Jim Nieb	Meet the Spartans	2008		
George W. Bush	Josh Brolin	W.	2008		
George W. Bush	Connor Trinneer	American Made	2017		
George W. Bush	Sam Rockwell	Vice	2018		
Barack Obama	Christopher B. Duncan	My Name Is Khan	2010		
Barack Obama	Hasan Al Farouq	Obama Anak Menteng	2010		
Barack Obama	Kevin Michael Richardson	Justice League: The Flashpoint Paradox	2013		
Barack Obama	Orlando Eric Street	The Butler	2013		
Barack Obama	Parker Sawyers	Southside With You	2016		
Barack Obama	Devon Terrell	Barry	2016		
Barack Obama	Iman Crosson	Tere Bin Laden: Dead or Alive	2016		
Barack Obama	Reggie Brown	Barbershop: The Next Cut	2016		
Barack Obama	Reggie Brown	War Machine	2017		
Donald Trump	Johnny Depp	Donald Trump's The Art of the Deal: The Movie	2016		
Donald Trump	Jon Culshaw	The Queen's Corgi	2019		
Donald Trump	Kirk Thornton	The Queen's Corgi	2019		
Donald Trump	Timothy Banfield	Trump vs the Illuminati	2020		
Donald Trump	Sebastian Stan	The Apprentice	2024		
Joe Biden	Greg Kinnear	Confirmation	2016		
Joe Biden	John James	My Son Hunter	2022		

=== Television ===
President	Actor	Program	Year
George Washington	Lowell Gilmore	Telephone Time	1956–1957
George Washington	Robert Douglas	One Step Beyond, Season 3 – "Night of Decision"	1961
George Washington	Howard St. John	The Patriots (television film)	1963
George Washington	Lorne Greene	Swing Out, Sweet Land (television film)	1970
George Washington	Will Geer	Bewitched (episodes 8.21, 8.22)	1972
George Washington	David Hooks	The Adams Chronicles	1976
George Washington	Peter Graves	The Rebels	1979
George Washington	Barry Bostwick	George Washington (miniseries)	1984
George Washington	Barry Bostwick	George Washington II: The Forging of a Nation (miniseries)	1986
George Washington	Dennis Miller	Saturday Night Live (NBC)	1986
George Washington	Maurice LaMarche	Histeria!	1999
George Washington	Michael Santo	Liberty's Kids	2002
George Washington	Kelsey Grammer	Benedict Arnold: A Question of Honor	2003
George Washington	Steven Weber	Reefer Madness (Showtime television film)	2005
George Washington	David Morse	John Adams	2008
George Washington	Louis Herthum	Sleepy Hollow	2014
George Washington	Ian Kahn	Turn: Washington's Spies	2014–2017
George Washington	Jason O'Mara	Sons of Liberty	2015
George Washington	Tom Kenny	The Mr. Peabody & Sherman Show	2015–2016
George Washington	Damian O'Hare	Timeless	2016
George Washington	Randall Batinkoff	Legends of Tomorrow	2017
George Washington	Simon Harrison	Outlander, episode "Wilmington"	2018
George Washington	Nicholas Rowe	Washington	2020
George Washington	Rob Reiner	Life, Larry and the Pursuit of Unhappiness	2026
John Adams	David McCallum	Profiles in Courage	1964
John Adams	William Shatner	Swing Out, Sweet Land (television film)	1970
John Adams	George Grizzard	The Adams Chronicles	1976
John Adams	William Daniels	The Rebels	1979
John Adams	Hal Holbrook	George Washington	1984
John Adams	Paul Collins	George Washington II: The Forging of a Nation	1986
John Adams	Billy West	Histeria!	1998
John Adams	Billy Crystal	Liberty's Kids	2002–2003
John Adams	Simon Russell Beale	John and Abigail Adams on the PBS program The American Experience	2006
John Adams	Paul Giamatti	John Adams	2008
John Adams	Henry Thomas	Sons of Liberty	2015
John Adams	Eddie Marsan	Franklin (miniseries)	2024
John Adams	Sarah Sherman	Saturday Night Live (NBC)	2025
Thomas Jefferson	Charlton Heston	The Patriots (television film)	1963
Thomas Jefferson	Hugh O'Brian	Swing Out, Sweet Land (television film)	1970
Thomas Jefferson	Albert Stratton	The Adams Chronicles	1976
Thomas Jefferson	Jeffrey Jones	George Washington II: The Forging of a Nation	1986
Thomas Jefferson	Tim Robbins	Saturday Night Live (NBC)	1992
Thomas Jefferson	Billy West	Histeria!	1998
Thomas Jefferson	Sam Neill	Sally Hemings: An American Scandal	2000
Thomas Jefferson	Robert De Niro	Saturday Night Live (NBC)	2002
Thomas Jefferson	Ben Stiller	Liberty's Kids	2002–2003
Thomas Jefferson	Stephen Dillane	John Adams	2008
Thomas Jefferson	Steven Weber	Sleepy Hollow	2015
Thomas Jefferson	Seth Meyers	Saturday Night Live (NBC)	2017
Thomas Jefferson	Jason Sudeikis	Saturday Night Live (NBC)	2021
Thomas Jefferson	Michael Longfellow	Saturday Night Live (NBC)	2025
Thomas Jefferson	Alan Tudyk	Life, Larry and the Pursuit of Unhappiness	2026
James Madison	Ken Kercheval	The Adams Chronicles	1976
James Madison	Guy Paul	George Washington II: The Forging of a Nation	1986
James Madison	Rachel Dratch	Saturday Night Live (NBC)	2000
James Madison	Chris Parnell	Saturday Night Live (NBC)	2002
James Madison	Warren Buffett	Liberty's Kids	2003
James Madison	Bob Dorough	The Mr. Peabody & Sherman Show	2016
James Monroe	Henry Butler	The Adams Chronicles	1976
James Monroe	Robert Kelly	George Washington II: The Forging of a Nation	1986
James Monroe	Phil Hartman	Saturday Night Live (NBC)	1989
John Quincy Adams	Douglas Campbell	Profiles in Courage	1965
John Quincy Adams	David Birney	The Adams Chronicles	1976
John Quincy Adams	William Daniels	The Adams Chronicles	1976
John Quincy Adams	Mark Winkworth	The Adams Chronicles	1976
John Quincy Adams	Steven Grover	The Adams Chronicles	1976
John Quincy Adams	Steve Austin	The Adams Chronicles	1976
John Quincy Adams	Marcel Trenchard	The Adams Chronicles	1976
John Quincy Adams	Colin Fox	Enslavement: The True Story of Fanny Kemble (television film)	2000
John Quincy Adams	Steven Hinkle	John Adams	2008
John Quincy Adams	Ebon Moss-Bachrach	John Adams	2008
Andrew Jackson	Basil Ruysdael	Davy Crockett	1955
Andrew Jackson	Leslie Kimmell	The Adventures of Jim Bowie, Season 1 – "Jackson's Assassination"	1957
Andrew Jackson	Wesley Addy	The Adams Chronicles	1976
Andrew Jackson	G. D. Spradlin	Gone to Texas (television film)	1986
Andrew Jackson	Kris Kristofferson	Texas Rising	2015
William Henry Harrison	David Clennon	Tecumseh	1994
William Henry Harrison	Fred Melamed	Life, Larry and the Pursuit of Unhappiness	2026
John Tyler	Billy West (voice)	Futurama	2011
James Buchanan	Peter Carlisle	Edward the Seventh	1975
James Buchanan	Larry David	Life, Larry and the Pursuit of Unhappiness	2026
Abraham Lincoln	Austin Green	Medic, Season 2 – "Black Friday"	1955
Abraham Lincoln	Austin Green	The Twilight Zone, Season 3 – "The Passersby"	1961
Abraham Lincoln	Ronnie Lee	Telephone Time, Season 1 – "The Stepmother"	1956
Abraham Lincoln	Barry Atwater	One Step Beyond, Season 2 – "The Day the World Wept: The Lincoln Story"	1960
Abraham Lincoln	Robert Marsden	Doctor Who, season 2 – "The Chase"	1965
Abraham Lincoln	Ford Rainey	The Time Tunnel – "The Death Trap"	1966
Abraham Lincoln	Lee Bergere	Star Trek (original series episode The Savage Curtain)	1969
Abraham Lincoln	Hal Holbrook	Carl Sandburg's Lincoln	1974–76
Abraham Lincoln	Stephen D. Newman	The Adams Chronicles	1976
Abraham Lincoln	Ford Rainey	Captains and the Kings (miniseries)	1976
Abraham Lincoln	Gregory Peck	The Blue and the Gray	1982
Abraham Lincoln	Tony Rosato	Saturday Night Live (NBC)	1982
Abraham Lincoln	Joe Piscopo	Saturday Night Live (NBC)	1983
Abraham Lincoln	Hal Holbrook	North and South	1985
Abraham Lincoln	Hal Holbrook	North and South: Book II	1986
Abraham Lincoln	F. Murray Abraham	Dream West	1986
Abraham Lincoln	Terry Sweeney	Saturday Night Live (NBC)	1986
Abraham Lincoln	Sam Waterston	Lincoln	1988
Abraham Lincoln	Jack Klaff	Red Dwarf, Season 4 – "Meltdown"	1991
Abraham Lincoln	Jason Robards	The Perfect Tribute (television film)	1991
Abraham Lincoln	Phil Hartman	Saturday Night Live (NBC)	1991
Abraham Lincoln	Kris Kristofferson	Tad (television film)	1995
Abraham Lincoln	Will Ferrell	Saturday Night Live (NBC)	1996
Abraham Lincoln	Lance Henriksen	The Day Lincoln Was Shot (television film)	1998
Abraham Lincoln	Dann Florek	The Secret Diary of Desmond Pfeiffer	1998
Abraham Lincoln	David Selby	Touched by an Angel, Season 5 – "Beautiful Dreamer"	1998
Abraham Lincoln	Maurice LaMarche	Histeria!	1999
Abraham Lincoln	Peter Reneday	The Grim Adventures of Billy & Mandy	2001–2008
Abraham Lincoln	Will Forte (voice)	Clone High	2002–2003
Abraham Lincoln	Christopher McCulloch	The Venture Bros., Season 2 – Guess Who's Coming to State Dinner?	2006
Abraham Lincoln	Darrell Hammond	Saturday Night Live (NBC)	2006
Abraham Lincoln	Pendleton Ward	Adventure Time	2007–2016
Abraham Lincoln	David Livingstone	Supernatural, Season 5 – "Fallen Idols"	2009
Abraham Lincoln	Kevin Sorbo	FDR: American Badass!	2012
Abraham Lincoln	Bill Oberst Jr.	Abraham Lincoln vs. Zombies	2012
Abraham Lincoln	Louis C.K.	Saturday Night Live (NBC)	2012
Abraham Lincoln	Bill Hader	Saturday Night Live (NBC)	2013
Abraham Lincoln	Robert Broski	Lincoln@Gettysburg (PBS television movie)	2013
Abraham Lincoln	Robert Broski	Shock Docs, Season 2 – "Demon in the White House"	2021
Abraham Lincoln	Dan Patrick	The Ridiculous 6	2015
Abraham Lincoln	Michael Krebs	Timeless, Season 1 – "The Assassination of Abraham Lincoln"	2016
Abraham Lincoln	Jeff Bennett	The Mr. Peabody & Sherman Show, Season 4 – "Abraham Lincoln"	2017
Abraham Lincoln	John Zachary	Sleepy Hollow, Season 4 – "Columbia"	2017
Abraham Lincoln	Carel Nel	Grant	2020
Abraham Lincoln	Graham Sibley	Abraham Lincoln	2022
Abraham Lincoln	Taylor Simmons	Young Rock, Season 3 – "The People Need You"	2022
Abraham Lincoln	Hamish Linklater	Manhunt	2024
Abraham Lincoln	Bill Hader	Life, Larry and the Pursuit of Unhappiness	2026
Andrew Johnson	Walter Matthau	Profiles in Courage	1965
Andrew Johnson	Bill Hindman	The Ordeal of Dr. Mudd (television film)	1980
Andrew Johnson	Ken McNicol	Timeless, Season 1 – "The Assassination of Abraham Lincoln"	2016
Andrew Johnson	Seth Morris	Life, Larry and the Pursuit of Unhappiness	2026
Ulysses S. Grant	Paul Birch	The Adventures of Rin-Tin-Tin, Season 2 – "Rin Tin Tin Meets Mister President"	1955
Ulysses S. Grant	Paul Birch	Black Saddle – "Mr. Simpson"	1960
Ulysses S. Grant	Paul Birch	Wagon Train, Season 4 – "The Colter Craven Story"	1960
Ulysses S. Grant	William Bryant	The Rebel, Season 2 – "Johnny Yuma at Appomattox"	1960
Ulysses S. Grant	William Bryant	Branded, Season 4 – "The Assassins" (two parter)	1966
Ulysses S. Grant	Hayden Rorke	Johnny Shiloh (television film)	1963
Ulysses S. Grant	Roy Engel	The Wild Wild West (7 episodes)	1965–1969
Ulysses S. Grant	Norman Burton	Carl Sandburg's Lincoln	1974
Ulysses S. Grant	Mark Slade	The Life and Times of Grizzly Adams	1978
Ulysses S. Grant	Rip Torn	The Blue and the Gray	1982
Ulysses S. Grant	Tim Kazurinsky	Saturday Night Live (NBC)	1982
Ulysses S. Grant	Mark Moses	North and South	1985
Ulysses S. Grant	Anthony Zerbe	North and South: Book II	1986
Ulysses S. Grant	James Gammon	Lincoln	1988
Ulysses S. Grant	Rutherford Cravens	North and South: Book III	1994
Ulysses S. Grant	John Ashton	The Day Lincoln Was Shot	1998
Ulysses S. Grant	Kelly Connell	The Secret Diary of Desmond Pfeiffer	1998
Ulysses S. Grant	Fred Thompson	Bury My Heart at Wounded Knee (television film)	2007
Ulysses S. Grant	Victor Slezak	Hell on Wheels	2013–2016
Ulysses S. Grant	Terry Lewis	Timeless, Season 1 – "The Assassination of Abraham Lincoln"	2016
Ulysses S. Grant	John Churchill	Legends of Tomorrow, Season 2 – "Abominations"	2016
Ulysses S. Grant	Justin Salinger	Grant	2020
Ulysses S. Grant	Justin Salinger	Abraham Lincoln	2022
Ulysses S. Grant	Wayne Brett	Death by Lighting	2025
James A. Garfield	Ian Watkin	The Sound and the Silence (television film)	1992
James A. Garfield	Shuler Hensley	American Experience	2016
James A. Garfield	Michael Shannon	Death by Lighting	2025
Chester A. Arthur	Nick Offerman	Death by Lighting	2025
Grover Cleveland	Carroll O'Connor	Profiles in Courage	1965
Grover Cleveland	A.J. Freeman	Timestalkers (television film)	1987
Grover Cleveland	Richard Herd	The Adventures of Brisco County, Jr.	1994
William McKinley	Stephen Coit	Captains and the Kings (miniseries)	1976
William McKinley	Brian Keith	Rough Riders	1997
William McKinley	Brent Crawford	Murdoch Mysteries, Season 7 Ep. 15 "The Spy Who Came Up to the Cold"	2014
William McKinley	Gary Augustynek	Houdini & Doyle	2016
Theodore Roosevelt	Frank Albertson	My Friend Flicka, Season 1 Ep. 24 "Rough and Ready"	1956
Theodore Roosevelt	Karl Swenson	Brighty of the Grand Canyon	1967
Theodore Roosevelt	Lee de Broux	Captains and the Kings (miniseries)	1976
Theodore Roosevelt	Claude Akins	The Gambler Returns: The Luck of the Draw (television film)	1991
Theodore Roosevelt	Claude Akins	Incident at Victoria Falls (television film)	1992
Theodore Roosevelt	James Gammon	The Young Indiana Jones Chronicles	1992
Theodore Roosevelt	Tom Berenger	Rough Riders	1997
Theodore Roosevelt	Marty Moreau	Murdoch Mysteries	2008–2018
Theodore Roosevelt	Kenan Thompson	Saturday Night Live (NBC)	2011
Theodore Roosevelt	Canon Kuipers	Abraham Lincoln vs. Zombies	2012
Theodore Roosevelt	James Clayton	Timeless, Season 1 – "The World's Columbian Exposition"	2017
Theodore Roosevelt	Alec Baldwin	American Experience	2018
Theodore Roosevelt	Brian Geraghty	The Alienist	2018
Theodore Roosevelt	Jeremy Bobb	The First Lady	2022
Theodore Roosevelt	Rufus Jones	Theodore Roosevelt	2022
Theodore Roosevelt	Rufus Jones	FDR	2023
William Howard Taft	Charles Watts	Telephone Time, Season 2 – "Rabbi on Wheels"	1957
William Howard Taft	Ross Durfee	The Winds of Kitty Hawk (television film)	1978
William Howard Taft	Victor Buono	Backstairs at the White House	1979
Woodrow Wilson	Whit Bissell	Profiles in Courage	1965
Woodrow Wilson	Robert Vaughn	Backstairs at the White House	1979
Woodrow Wilson	Robert Arden	A Dangerous Man: Lawrence After Arabia	1992
Woodrow Wilson	Josef Sommer	The Young Indiana Jones Chronicles	1993
Woodrow Wilson	Maurice LaMarche	Histeria!	1999
Woodrow Wilson	Judd Bankert	The World Wars	2014
Woodrow Wilson	Bryan Scott Johnson	Timeless, Season 2 – "Mrs. Sherlock Holmes"	2018
Woodrow Wilson	Ralph Garman (voice)	Family Guy, Season 18 – "Coma Guy"	2018
Warren G. Harding	George Kennedy	Backstairs at the White House	1979
Warren G. Harding	Malachy Cleary	Boardwalk Empire (episode Hold Me in Paradise)	2010
Calvin Coolidge	Ed Flanders	Backstairs at the White House	1979
Herbert Hoover	Larry Gates	Backstairs at the White House	1979
Franklin D. Roosevelt	John Belushi	Saturday Night Live (NBC)	1978
Franklin D. Roosevelt	Harry Shearer	Saturday Night Live (NBC)	1979
Franklin D. Roosevelt	John Anderson	Backstairs at the White House	1979
Franklin D. Roosevelt	Arthur Hill	Churchill and the Generals	1979
Franklin D. Roosevelt	Jason Robards	F.D.R.: The Last Year	1980
Franklin D. Roosevelt	Robert Vaughn	FDR: That Man in the White House	1982
Franklin D. Roosevelt	Tim Kazurinsky	Saturday Night Live (NBC)	1982–1983
Franklin D. Roosevelt	Ralph Bellamy	The Winds of War	1983
Franklin D. Roosevelt	David Ogden Stiers	J. Edgar Hoover	1987
Franklin D. Roosevelt	David Ogden Stiers	Day One	1989
Franklin D. Roosevelt	Josef Sommer	The Kennedys of Massachusetts	1990
Franklin D. Roosevelt	John Lithgow	World War II: When Lions Roared	1994
Franklin D. Roosevelt	Bob Gunton	Kingfish: A Story of Huey P. Long	1995
Franklin D. Roosevelt	Christopher Plummer	Winchell	1998
Franklin D. Roosevelt	Dennis Howard	Annie	1999
Franklin D. Roosevelt	Robert Hardy	Bertie and Elizabeth	2002
Franklin D. Roosevelt	Robert Hardy	Le Grand Charles	2006
Franklin D. Roosevelt	Johnathan Higgins	The Man Who Saved Christmas	2002
Franklin D. Roosevelt	Alan Cumming	Reefer Madness (Showtime television film)	2005
Franklin D. Roosevelt	Roger L. Jackson (voice)	Robot Chicken	2005
Franklin D. Roosevelt	Len Cariou	Into the Storm	2009
Franklin D. Roosevelt	Maurice LaMarche (voice)	Futurama	2011
Franklin D. Roosevelt	Bill Hader	Saturday Night Live (NBC)	2011
Franklin D. Roosevelt	Barry Bostwick	FDR: American Badass!	2012
Franklin D. Roosevelt	Ross Douglas	A Christmas Story 2	2012
Franklin D. Roosevelt	Dino Gigaliano	The World Wars	2014
Franklin D. Roosevelt	Mikey Day	Saturday Night Live (NBC)	2016
Franklin D. Roosevelt	Joseph Culp	Agents of S.H.I.E.L.D.	2020
Franklin D. Roosevelt	Kyle MacLachlan	Atlantic Crossing	2020
Franklin D. Roosevelt	Alan Toy	Annie Live!	2021
Franklin D. Roosevelt	Charlie Plummer	The First Lady	2022
Franklin D. Roosevelt	Kiefer Sutherland	The First Lady	2022
Franklin D. Roosevelt	Christian McKay	FDR	2023
Harry S. Truman	E. G. Marshall	Collision Course: Truman vs. MacArthur	1976
Harry S. Truman	Harry Morgan	Backstairs at the White House	1979
Harry S. Truman	Walker Edmiston	J. Edgar Hoover	1987
Harry S. Truman	Richard Dysart	Day One	1989
Harry S. Truman	Kenneth Welsh	Hiroshima	1995
Harry S. Truman	Billy West (voice)	Futurama	2001
Harry S. Truman	Bob Gunton	Project Blue Book	2019
Harry S. Truman	Seth MacFarlane	Cosmos: Possible Worlds	2020
Harry S. Truman	Robert Sean Leonard	The First Lady	2022
Dwight D. Eisenhower	James Flavin	Francis Gary Powers: The True Story of the U-2 Spy Incident	1976
Dwight D. Eisenhower	Andrew Duggan	Backstairs at the White House	1979
Dwight D. Eisenhower	Robert Duvall	Ike (miniseries)	1979
Dwight D. Eisenhower	Richard Dysart	Churchill and the Generals	1979
Dwight D. Eisenhower	Robert Catrini	FDR: American Badass!	2012
Dwight D. Eisenhower	Matthew Marsh	The Crown	2017
John F. Kennedy	Vaughn Meader	The Ed Sullivan Show (CBS)	1963
John F. Kennedy	William Devane	The Missiles of October	1974
John F. Kennedy	Sam Chew Jr.	Young Joe, the Forgotten Kennedy (television film)	1977
John F. Kennedy	Dan Aykroyd	Saturday Night Live (NBC)	1978
John F. Kennedy	James Franciscus	Jacqueline Bouvier Kennedy	1981
John F. Kennedy	Sam Groom	Blood Feud (20th Century Fox Television)	1983
John F. Kennedy	Martin Sheen	Kennedy	1983
John F. Kennedy	Joe Piscopo	Saturday Night Live (NBC)	1983
John F. Kennedy	Billy Crystal	Saturday Night Live (NBC)	1984
John F. Kennedy	Randy Quaid	Saturday Night Live (NBC)	1985
John F. Kennedy	Cliff DeYoung	Robert Kennedy and His Times (miniseries)	1985
John F. Kennedy	Andrew Robinson	The Twilight Zone, Season 1, "Profile in Silver"	1986
John F. Kennedy	Robert Pine	Hoover vs. The Kennedys (miniseries)	1987
John F. Kennedy	Steven Weber	The Kennedys of Massachusetts (miniseries)	1990
John F. Kennedy	Stephen Collins	A Woman Named Jackie (miniseries)	1991
John F. Kennedy	Patrick Dempsey	JFK: Reckless Youth (miniseries)	1993
John F. Kennedy	Michael J. Shannon	Red Dwarf (episode 7.01)	1997
John F. Kennedy	William Petersen	The Rat Pack (television film)	1998
John F. Kennedy	Tim Matheson	Jackie Bouvier Kennedy Onassis	2000
John F. Kennedy	Christopher Miller (voice)	Clone High	2002–2003
John F. Kennedy	Jon Hamm	Saturday Night Live (NBC)	2010
John F. Kennedy	Greg Kinnear	The Kennedys (miniseries)	2011
John F. Kennedy	Steven Culp	Perception	2012
John F. Kennedy	Rob Lowe	Killing Kennedy (television film)	2013
John F. Kennedy	Michael C. Hall	The Crown	2017
John F. Kennedy	Caspar Phillipson	Project Blue Book	2020
John F. Kennedy	Aaron Craven	Legends of Tomorrow	2021
Lyndon B. Johnson	Jerry Hardin	The Twilight Zone, Season 1, "Profile in Silver"	1986
Lyndon B. Johnson	Nesbitt Blaisdell	Kennedy	1983
Lyndon B. Johnson	G. D. Spradlin	Robert Kennedy and His Times (miniseries)	1985
Lyndon B. Johnson	Richard Anderson	Hoover vs. The Kennedys (miniseries)	1987
Lyndon B. Johnson	Brian Smiar	A Woman Named Jackie (miniseries)	1991
Lyndon B. Johnson	James Cromwell	RFK	2002
Lyndon B. Johnson	Don Allison	The Kennedys (miniseries)	2011
Lyndon B. Johnson	Francis Guinan	Killing Kennedy (television film)	2013
Lyndon B. Johnson	Peter Hall	Legends of Tomorrow	2017
Lyndon B. Johnson	Clancy Brown	The Crown	2019
Richard Nixon	Rich Little	The Kopykats (ABC)	1972
Richard Nixon	Rip Torn	Blind Ambition (CBS miniseries)	1979
Richard Nixon	Dan Aykroyd	Saturday Night Live (NBC)	1976–1979
Richard Nixon	Tony Rosato	Saturday Night Live (NBC)	1982
Richard Nixon	Joe Piscopo	Saturday Night Live (NBC)	1984
Richard Nixon	John Turturro	Saturday Night Live (NBC)	1994
Richard Nixon	Billy West (voice)	Futurama	1999–2013
Richard Nixon	Darrell Hammond	Saturday Night Live (NBC)	2009
Richard Nixon	Stuart Milligan	Doctor Who ("The Impossible Astronaut"/"Day of the Moon")	2011
Richard Nixon	Rob Brydon	Trust	2018
Richard Nixon	Paul Ganus	Legends of Tomorrow	2019
Richard Nixon	Paul Wilson	The First Lady	2022
Richard Nixon	Danny Winn	Gaslit	2022
Richard Nixon	Gary Cole	Agent Elvis	2023
Gerald Ford	Chevy Chase	Saturday Night Live (NBC)	1975–1976; 1978; 1980; 1985
Gerald Ford	Josef Sommer	The Betty Ford Story	1987
Gerald Ford	Dan Castellaneta	The Simpsons ("Two Bad Neighbors")	1996
Gerald Ford	Drew Snyder	Dark Skies	1997
Gerald Ford	Jeffrey Ventimilia	That '70s Show	1998
Gerald Ford	Joe Stokes	Days That Shook the World, Season 1 Ep. 10 "The Assassination of JFK/The Resignation of Nixon"	2003
Gerald Ford	Aaron Eckhart	The First Lady	2022
Gerald Ford	Jake Picking	The First Lady	2022
Jimmy Carter	Dan Aykroyd	Saturday Night Live (NBC)	1976–1979
Jimmy Carter	Joe Piscopo	Saturday Night Live (NBC)	1980–1982
Jimmy Carter	Dana Carvey	Saturday Night Live (NBC)	1988–1989
Jimmy Carter	Michael McKean	Saturday Night Live (NBC)	1994
Jimmy Carter	Brad Maynard	The Tick ("Pilot')	2001
Jimmy Carter	David Herman (voice)	King of the Hill ("The Father, the Son and J.C.")	2001
Jimmy Carter	Darrell Hammond	Saturday Night Live (NBC)	2002–2009
Jimmy Carter	Ben Livingston	Hunters	2020
Ronald Reagan	Chevy Chase	Saturday Night Live (NBC)	1976
Ronald Reagan	Charles Rocket	Saturday Night Live (NBC)	1980–1981
Ronald Reagan	Harry Shearer	Saturday Night Live (NBC)	1980–1984
Ronald Reagan	Joe Piscopo	Saturday Night Live (NBC)	1981–1984
Ronald Reagan	Johnny Carson	The Tonight Show (NBC)	1981–1989
Ronald Reagan	Chris Barrie	Spitting Image	1984–1990
Ronald Reagan	Roger Blake	Spitting Image	1990–1996
Ronald Reagan	Randy Quaid	Saturday Night Live (NBC)	1985–1986
Ronald Reagan	Robin Williams	Saturday Night Live (NBC)	1986
Ronald Reagan	Phil Hartman	Saturday Night Live (NBC)	1986–1991
Ronald Reagan	Robert Beatty	Breakthrough at Reykjavik (Granada Television UK)	1987
Ronald Reagan	Bryan Clark	Guts and Glory: The Rise and Fall of Oliver North (television film – CBS)	1989
Ronald Reagan	Bryan Clark	Without Warning: The James Brady Story (television film – HBO)	1991
Ronald Reagan	Bryan Clark	Dark Skies, Season 1, "Bloodlines"	1997
Ronald Reagan	Hank Azaria (voice)	The Simpsons	1993, 1994, 2012
Ronald Reagan	Richard Crenna	The Day Reagan Was Shot	2001
Ronald Reagan	James Brolin	The Reagans	2003
Ronald Reagan	Seth MacFarlane (voice)	Family Guy	2005, 2009
Ronald Reagan	Jim Meskimen (voice)	The Boondocks	2006
Ronald Reagan	Seth MacFarlane (voice)	American Dad!	2008, 2012
Ronald Reagan	Dave Coulier (voice)	China, IL	2011–present
Ronald Reagan	Bruce Campbell	Fargo	2015
Ronald Reagan	Michael Showalter	Wet Hot American Summer: First Day of Camp	2015
Ronald Reagan	Tim Matheson	Killing Reagan (docudrama)	2016
Ronald Reagan	Jefferson Black	Timeless	2018
George H. W. Bush	Jim Downey	Saturday Night Live (NBC)	1980
George H. W. Bush	Dana Carvey	Saturday Night Live (NBC)	1987–1993; 1996; 2000
George H. W. Bush	Harry Shearer	The Golden Girls	1990
George H. W. Bush	Roger Blake	Spitting Image	1990–1996
George H. W. Bush	Bill Farmer	Murphy Brown	1991
George H. W. Bush	Harry Shearer (voice)	The Simpsons	1991–2014
George H. W. Bush	Michael Greene	The Day Reagan Was Shot	2001
George H. W. Bush	Jim Meskimen (voice)	Time Squad	2003
George H. W. Bush	Fred Armisen	Saturday Night Live (NBC)	2005
George H. W. Bush	Michael Ian Black	Wet Hot American Summer: Ten Years Later	2017
George H. W. Bush	Jim Meskimen (voice)	Good Omens	2019
George H. W. Bush	John Schmedes	The First Lady	2022
George H. W. Bush	Patrick Fabian	Ponies	2026
Bill Clinton	Phil Hartman	Saturday Night Live (NBC)	1992–1994
Bill Clinton	Frank Welker	Animaniacs	1993–1998
Bill Clinton	Michael McKean	Saturday Night Live (NBC)	1994
Bill Clinton	Jon Culshaw	Spitting Image	1994–1996
Bill Clinton	Pat Rick	Murphy Brown	1995
Bill Clinton	David Herman	MADtv	1995–1996
Bill Clinton	Frank Welker	Pinky and the Brain	1995–1998
Bill Clinton	Darrell Hammond	Saturday Night Live (NBC)	1995–2009; 2015–2016; 2019
Bill Clinton	Dana Carvey	Saturday Night Live (NBC)	1996
Bill Clinton	Bryan Callen	MADtv	1996–1997
Bill Clinton	Pat Rick	Leaving L.A.	1997
Bill Clinton	Trey Parker (voice)	South Park	1998
Bill Clinton	Seth MacFarlane	Family Guy (voice)	1999–2002, 2005–present
Bill Clinton	Seth MacFarlane	Ted	2026
Bill Clinton	Gabriel Iglesias	All That	2000
Bill Clinton	Frank Caliendo	Frank TV	2007–2008
Bill Clinton	Dennis Quaid	The Special Relationship	2010
Bill Clinton	Chriss Anglin	Naked Run	2011
Bill Clinton	Michael Krass	Beatrix, Oranje onder vuur	2012
Bill Clinton	Beck Bennett	Saturday Night Live (NBC)	2013
Bill Clinton	Clive Owen	Impeachment: American Crime Story	2021–present
George W. Bush	Trey Parker (voice)	South Park	1997–2006
George W. Bush	Will Ferrell	Saturday Night Live (NBC)	1999–2002, 2008–2009; 2012; 2015; 2018
George W. Bush	Christian Duguay	MADtv	2000–2001
George W. Bush	Timothy Bottoms	That's My Bush! (Comedy Central)	2001
George W. Bush	Will Sasso	MADtv	2001–2002
George W. Bush	Chris Parnell	Saturday Night Live (NBC)	2002–2003
George W. Bush	Frank Caliendo	MADtv	2002–2006
George W. Bush	Steve Bridges	JAG	2002
George W. Bush	Steve Bridges	NCIS	2003
George W. Bush	Jim Meskimen	Time Squad	2003
George W. Bush	Darrell Hammond	Saturday Night Live (NBC)	2003
George W. Bush	Will Forte	Saturday Night Live (NBC)	2004–2006
George W. Bush	Brent Mendenhall	Recount	2008
George W. Bush	James Adomian	The Late Late Show with Craig Ferguson	2005–2009
George W. Bush	Jason Sudeikis	Saturday Night Live	2006–2008, 2010
George W. Bush	Frank Caliendo	Frank TV	2007–2008
George W. Bush	Dennis Quaid	Katrina: American Crime Story	2018
George W. Bush	Mark Moses	The First Lady	2022
Barack Obama	Ron Butler	Jimmy Kimmel Live!	2007
Barack Obama	Larry Wilmore	The Daily Show with Jon Stewart	2008
Barack Obama	Trey Parker (voice)	South Park	2008
Barack Obama	Deon Davis	WWE Raw	2008
Barack Obama	Freddy Lockhart	Frank TV	2008
Barack Obama	Keegan-Michael Key	MADtv	2008–2009
Barack Obama	Christopher B. Duncan	The Tonight Show with Jay Leno	2008–2009
Barack Obama	Fred Armisen	Saturday Night Live (NBC)	2008–2012
Barack Obama	Kevin Scarlo	Jimmy Kimmel Live!	2009
Barack Obama	Kevin Michael Richardson (voice)	Batman: The Brave and the Bold (episode 48, Cry Freedom Fighters)	2010
Barack Obama	Marlin Hill (voice)	The Boondocks	2010
Barack Obama	Jordan Peele	Key and Peele	2012
Barack Obama	Jay Pharoah	Saturday Night Live (NBC)	2012–2016
Barack Obama	Dion Flynn	Late Night with Jimmy Fallon	2012–2014
Barack Obama	Dion Flynn	The Tonight Show Starring Jimmy Fallon	2014
Barack Obama	Lovell Adams-Gray	Legends of Tomorrow	2018
Barack Obama	Kingsley Ben-Adir	The Comey Rule	2020
Barack Obama	Chris Redd	Saturday Night Live (NBC)	2021
Barack Obama	O. T. Fagbenle	The First Lady	2022
Barack Obama	Julian De Niro	The First Lady	2022
Donald Trump	Phil Hartman	Saturday Night Live (NBC)	1988–1990
Donald Trump	Darrell Hammond	Saturday Night Live (NBC)	1999–2009, 2011, 2015–2016
Donald Trump	Trey Parker (voice)	South Park	2001
Donald Trump	Justin Louis	Trump Unauthorized	2005
Donald Trump	Jason Sudeikis	Saturday Night Live (NBC)	2012
Donald Trump	Taran Killam	Saturday Night Live (NBC)	2015
Donald Trump	Anthony Atamanuik	The President Show	2017
Donald Trump	Bob Dibuono (voice)	Murphy Brown	2018
Donald Trump	Jeff Bergman (voice)	Our Cartoon President	2018–present
Donald Trump	Josh Robert Thompson (voice)	Family Guy	2019
Donald Trump	Brendan Gleeson	The Comey Rule	2020
Donald Trump	Matt Forde (voice)	Spitting Image	2020–present
Donald Trump	John Cena	Saturday Night Live (NBC)	2016
Donald Trump	Alec Baldwin	Saturday Night Live (NBC)	2016–2020
Donald Trump	James Austin Johnson	Saturday Night Live (NBC)	2021–present
Joe Biden	Kevin Nealon	Saturday Night Live (NBC)	1991
Joe Biden	Jason Sudeikis	Saturday Night Live (NBC)	2007–2013, 2017, 2019–2021
Joe Biden	John J. Reiner	Community	2011
Joe Biden	Josh Robert Thompson (voice)	Family Guy	2015
Joe Biden	Woody Harrelson	Saturday Night Live (NBC)	2019
Joe Biden	Billy West (voice)	Spitting Image	2020–present
Joe Biden	John Mulaney	Saturday Night Live (NBC)	2020
Joe Biden	Jim Carrey	Saturday Night Live (NBC)	2020
Joe Biden	Alex Moffat	Saturday Night Live (NBC)	2020–2021
Joe Biden	James Austin Johnson	Saturday Night Live (NBC)	2021–2022
Joe Biden	Pete Davidson	Saturday Night Live (NBC)	2022
Joe Biden	Mikey Day	Saturday Night Live (NBC)	2023–2024
Joe Biden	Dana Carvey	Saturday Night Live (NBC)	2024

=== Video games ===
President	Actor	Game	Year
George Washington	Daniel Riordan	Age of Empires III	2005
George Washington	Daniel Riordan	Age of Empires III: The WarChiefs	2007
George Washington	Daniel Riordan	Age of Empires III: Definitive Edition	2020
George Washington	Marcel Jeanin	Civilization V	2010
George Washington	Robin Atkin Downes	Assassin's Creed III	2012
George Washington	Tod Fennell	Assassin's Creed Rogue	2014
Abraham Lincoln	Wil Wheaton	Code Name: S.T.E.A.M.	2015
Abraham Lincoln	Sean Smith	Civilization VI	2023
Theodore Roosevelt	Richard Tatum	Civilization VI	2016
John F. Kennedy	Chriss Anglin	Call of Duty: Black Ops	2010
John F. Kennedy	Jim Meskimen	Call of Duty: Black Ops	2010
Lyndon B. Johnson	Richard McGonagle	Metal Gear Solid 3: Snake Eater	2004
Richard Nixon	Dave Mallow	Call of Duty: Black Ops	2010
Ronald Reagan	Jeff Bergman	Call of Duty: Black Ops Cold War	2020

=== Theater ===
President	Actor	Title	Year
George Washington	H.E. Eldridge	Dearest Enemy	1925
George Washington	Philip Merivale	Valley Forge	1934
George Washington	Cecil Humphreys	The Patriots	1943
George Washington	James Daly	The White House	1964
George Washington	Ken Howard	1600 Pennsylvania Avenue	1976
George Washington	Christopher Jackson	Hamilton (musical)	2015
John Adams	Eric Berry	The White House	1964
John Adams	William Daniels	1776	1969
John Adams	Ken Howard	1600 Pennsylvania Avenue	1976
John Adams	Brent Spiner	1776	1997
Thomas Jefferson	Carl Anthony	Hamilton (play)	1917
Thomas Jefferson	Raymond Edward Johnson	The Patriots	1943
Thomas Jefferson	Fritz Weaver	The White House	1964
Thomas Jefferson	Ken Howard	1776	1969
Thomas Jefferson	Ken Howard	1600 Pennsylvania Avenue	1976
Thomas Jefferson	Paul Michael Valley	1776	1997
Thomas Jefferson	Daveed Diggs	Hamilton (musical)	2015
James Madison	Okieriete Onaodowan	Hamilton (musical)	2015
James Monroe	Hardee Kirkland	Hamilton (play)	1917
James Monroe	Judson Laire	The Patriots	1943
James Monroe	James Daly	The White House	1964
James Monroe	Ken Howard	1600 Pennsylvania Avenue	1976
John Quincy Adams	Gene Wilder	The White House	1964
John Quincy Adams	Jeff Hiller	Bloody Bloody Andrew Jackson	2008
Andrew Jackson	Fritz Weaver	The White House	1964
Andrew Jackson	Benjamin Walker	Bloody Bloody Andrew Jackson	2008
Martin Van Buren	James Daly	The White House	1964
Martin Van Buren	Lucas Near-Verbrugghe	Bloody Bloody Andrew Jackson	2008
William Henry Harrison	James Daly	The White House	1964
John Tyler	Gene Wilder	The White House	1964
James K. Polk	Eric Berry	The White House	1964
Zachary Taylor	Eugene Roche	The White House	1964
Millard Fillmore	Fritz Weaver	The White House	1964
Franklin Pierce	Fritz Weaver	The White House	1964
James Buchanan	James Daly	The White House	1964
Abraham Lincoln	Benjamin Chapin	Lincoln	1906
Abraham Lincoln	Frank McGlynn	Abraham Lincoln	1918
Abraham Lincoln	Raymond Massey	Abe Lincoln in Illinois	1938
Abraham Lincoln	Fritz Weaver	The White House	1964
Abraham Lincoln	Lorrie Davis	Hair	1967
Abraham Lincoln	Conrad Ricamora	Oh, Mary!	2024
Andrew Johnson	James Daly	The White House	1964
Andrew Johnson	Ken Howard	1600 Pennsylvania Avenue	1976
Ulysses S. Grant	Sorrell Booke	The White House	1964
Ulysses S. Grant	Bill Raymond	Cold Harbor	1983
Rutherford B. Hayes	Gene Wilder	The White House	1964
James A. Garfield	William Parry	Assassins	1990
Chester A. Arthur	Eric Berry	The White House	1964
Grover Cleveland	James Daly	The White House	1964
William McKinley	Eric Berry	The White House	1964
Theodore Roosevelt	James Daly	The White House	1964
Theodore Roosevelt	Trey Wilson	Tintypes	1980
Theodore Roosevelt	Len Cariou	Teddy & Alice	1987
Theodore Roosevelt	Kevin Carolan	Newsies	2012
William Howard Taft	Michael McCarty	Teddy & Alice	1987
Woodrow Wilson	Fritz Weaver	The White House	1964
Woodrow Wilson	Grace McLean	Suffs	2022
Franklin D. Roosevelt	George M. Cohan	I'd Rather Be Right	1937
Franklin D. Roosevelt	Ralph Bellamy	Sunrise at Campobello	1958
Franklin D. Roosevelt	Raymond Thorne	Annie	1977
Harry S. Truman	James Whitmore	Give 'em Hell, Harry!	1975
Lyndon B. Johnson	Bryan Cranston	All the Way	2014
Lyndon B. Johnson	Brian Cox	The Great Society	2019
Richard Nixon	George S. Irving	An Evening with Richard Nixon	1972
Richard Nixon	Frank Langella	Frost/Nixon	2006
Gerald Ford	William Parry	Assassins	1990
Bill Clinton	John Lithgow	Hillary and Clinton	2016
George W. Bush	Alex Jennings	Stuff Happens	2004
George W. Bush	Will Ferrell	You're Welcome America	2009
Barack Obama	Peter Francis James	Hillary and Clinton	2018
Joe Biden	Brian Church	Say It Ain't So, Joe	2009

=== Online ===
Only speaking/performing roles in non-televised productions with over 5 million views are included.

President	Actor	Series	Video	Year
George Washington	Peter Shukoff	Epic Rap Battles of History	George Washington vs William Wallace	2014
Thomas Jefferson	R. Keith Harris	Soomo Publishing	Too Late to Apologize: A Declaration	2010
Thomas Jefferson	Peter Shukoff	Epic Rap Battles of History	Frederick Douglass vs Thomas Jefferson	2016
Abraham Lincoln	Peter Shukoff	Epic Rap Battles of History	Abe Lincoln vs Chuck Norris	2010
Abraham Lincoln	Peter Shukoff	Epic Rap Battles of History	Barack Obama vs. Mitt Romney	2012
Abraham Lincoln	Peter Shukoff	Epic Rap Battles of History	Donald Trump vs Hillary Clinton	2016
Theodore Roosevelt	Lloyd Ahlquist	Epic Rap Battles of History	Theodore Roosevelt vs Winston Churchill	2016
Theodore Roosevelt	Lloyd Ahlquist	Epic Rap Battles of History	Donald Trump vs Kamala Harris	2024
George W. Bush	Jim Meskimen	JibJab	This Land!	2004
Barack Obama	Iman Crosson	Alphacat spoofs	T.I. – Whatever You Like Spoof!	2008
Barack Obama	Iman Crosson	Alphacat spoofs	Beyoncé – Single Ladies Spoof	2009
Barack Obama	Iman Crosson	Alphacat spoofs	T.I. Dead and Gone Spoof	2009
Barack Obama	Iman Crosson	Alphacat spoofs	Blame It – Jamie Foxx – Barack Obama Spoof	2009
Barack Obama	James Davis	Baracka Flacka Flames	Head of the State	2010
Barack Obama	Iman Crosson	Alphacat spoofs	President Obama on Death of Osama bin Laden (spoof)	2011
Barack Obama	Danny Watson	Bart Baker parodies	"Call Me Maybe" Parody ft. Obama	2012
Barack Obama	Iman Crosson	What's Trending	Obama Style (Psy Gangnam Style Parody)	2012
Barack Obama	Reggie Brown	Reggie Brown impersonations	Obama Gangnam Style!	2012
Barack Obama	Iman Crosson	Epic Rap Battles of History	Barack Obama vs. Mitt Romney	2012
Barack Obama	Iman Crosson	Alphacat spoofs	Harlem Shake (Barack Obama Edition)	2013
Barack Obama	Iman Crosson	Bart Baker parodies	Justin Bieber – "Confident" Parody	2014
Barack Obama	Reggie Brown	Reggie Brown impersonations	President Obama Accepts The ALS Ice Bucket Challenge	2014
Barack Obama	Iman Crosson	Alphacat spoofs	"Back to Back" (Drake spoof)	2015
Barack Obama	Theo Saidden	Superwog	Donald Trump vs Obama Rap Battle	2017
Donald Trump	Peter Shukoff	Epic Rap Battles of History	Donald Trump vs. Ebenezer Scrooge	2013
Donald Trump	Johnny Depp	Funny or Die	Donald Trump's The Art of the Deal: The Movie	2016
Donald Trump	Lloyd Ahlquist	Epic Rap Battles of History	Donald Trump vs Hillary Clinton	2016
Donald Trump	Klemen Slakonja	Klemen Slakonja music videos	Donald Trump ft. Melania Trump - Golden Dump (The Trump Hump) by Klemen Slakonja	2016
Donald Trump	Peter Gilroy	Bart Baker parodies	Zay Hilfigerrr & Zayion McCall – "Juju On That Beat" PARODY ft. DONALD TRUMP	2016
Donald Trump	Peter Gilroy	Bart Baker parodies	Kendrick Lamar - "HUMBLE" PARODY ft. DONALD TRUMP	2017
Donald Trump	Theo Saidden	Superwog	Donald Trump vs Obama Rap Battle	2017
Donald Trump	Lloyd Ahlquist	Epic Rap Battles of History	Donald Trump vs Joe Biden	2020
Donald Trump	Lloyd Ahlquist	Epic Rap Battles of History	Donald Trump vs Kamala Harris	2024
Donald Trump	Shane Gillis	Kill Tony	KT #672 - DONALD TRUMP (SHANE GILLIS) + JOE BIDEN (ADAM RAY)	2024
Joe Biden	Peter Shukoff	Epic Rap Battles of History	Donald Trump vs Joe Biden	2020
Joe Biden	Peter Shukoff	Epic Rap Battles of History	Donald Trump vs Kamala Harris	2024
Joe Biden	Adam Ray	Kill Tony	KT #672 - DONALD TRUMP (SHANE GILLIS) + JOE BIDEN (ADAM RAY)	2024

== Male actors who played fictional presidents ==
=== Films ===
Actor	President	Film	Year
Andrew Duggan	President Melvin Trent	In Like Flint	1967
Pepi Hermine	President of the United States	Putney Swope	1969
William Windom	The President	Escape from the Planet of the Apes	1971
Dan Resin	The President	Hail	1972
Biff McGuire	The President	The Werewolf of Washington	1973
James Franciscus	President James Cassidy	The Greek Tycoon	1978
John Warner	President Timothy Kegan	Winter Kills	1979
Fred Willard	President Robert Fogerty	National Lampoon's Movie Madness	1982
Fred Willard	The President	The Pooch and the Pauper	2000
Eddie Albert	The President	Dreamscape	1984
Forrest J Ackerman	The President	Amazon Women on the Moon	1987
William Smith	The President	Terror in Beverly Hills	1989
Forrest Compton	President Flynn	McBain	1991
Alan Alda	The President	Canadian Bacon	1995
Stanley Anderson	The President	Armageddon	1998
Stanley Anderson	The President	The Rock	1996
Oscar Apfel	President of the United States	A Successful Calamity	1932
Tomas Arana	President Harry Carrey	The President's Staff	2013
William Atherton	President John Fields	Executive Power	1997
Diedrich Bader	President Lex Luthor (voice)	Superman: Red Son	2020
Robert Beatty	The President	Superman IV: The Quest for Peace	1987
John Beck	President John Fallbrook	The Alternate	2000
Michael Belson	The President	Wag the Dog	1997
Richard Belzer	The President	Species II	1998
Hunt Block	President Howard Lewis	Salt	2010
Bruce Boxleitner	President Martin Howard	Contagion	2002
Jeff Bridges	President Jackson Evans	The Contender	2000
Lloyd Bridges	President Thomas "Tug" Benson	Hot Shots! Part Deux	1993
Arthur Byron	President Stanley Craig	The President Vanishes	1934
James Caan	The President	Get Smart	2008
George Clooney	President Devlin	Spy Kids 3-D: Game Over	2003
George M. Cohan	President Peeter J. 'Doc' Varney	The Phantom President	1932
Stephen Colbert	President Hathaway	Monsters vs. Aliens	2009
Ronny Cox	President Tom Kimball	Captain America	1990
Ronny Cox	The President	Martians Go Home	1989
Ronny Cox	President Jack Neil	Murder at 1600	1997
Ronny Cox	President Simmons	Nadia's Promise	2014
Peter Coyote	President Adair T. Manning	Behind Enemy Lines II: Axis of Evil	2006
Peter Coyote	President Sterling	Dr. Dolittle: Tail to the Chief	2008
Terry Crews	President Dwayne Elizondo Mountain Dew Herbert Camacho	Idiocracy	2006
Luke Wilson	President Joe Bauers (aka "Not Sure")	Idiocracy	2006
James Cromwell	President Robert Fowler	The Sum of All Fears	2002
Roger Cross	The President	Polar Storm	2009
Mark Cuban	President Marcus Robbins	Sharknado 3: Oh Hell No!	2015
Robert Culp	The President	The Pelican Brief	1993
Jim Curley	The President	In the Line of Fire	1993
William Devane	The President	The Dark Knight Rises	2012
Michael Douglas	President Andrew Shepherd	The American President	1995
Sam Douglas	The President ("John")	Agent Cody Banks 2: Destination London	2004
Richard Dreyfuss	The President	Fail Safe	2000
Norman Bartold	The President	Capricorn One	1978
Charles Durning	President David T. Stevens	Twilight's Last Gleaming	1977
R. Lee Ermey	President Richard Benson	Megiddo: The Omega Code 2	2001
Michael Biehn	President David Alexander	Megiddo: The Omega Code 2	2001
Joe Estevez	President James Marshall	Corruption.Gov	2010
Tom Everett	The President	The Island	2005
Aaron Eckhart	President Benjamin Asher	Olympus Has Fallen	2013
Aaron Eckhart	President Benjamin Asher	London Has Fallen	2016
Henry Fonda	The President	Fail Safe	1964
Henry Fonda	The President	Meteor	1979
Glenn Ford	President Richardson	Virus	1980
Harrison Ford	President James Marshall	Air Force One	1997
Harrison Ford	President Thaddeus Ross	Captain America: Brave New World	2025
Jamie Foxx	President James W. Sawyer	White House Down	2013
Morgan Freeman	President Tom Beck	Deep Impact	1998
Morgan Freeman	Acting President Allan Trumbull	Olympus Has Fallen	2013
Morgan Freeman	President Allan Trumbull	Angel Has Fallen	2019
Andy García	President Andrew Palma	Geostorm	2017
Danny Glover	President Thomas Wilson	2012	2009
George Gobel	President of the United States	Rabbit Test	1978
Roy Gordon	The President	War of the Satellites	1958
Louis Gossett Jr.	President Gerald Fitzhugh	Left Behind: World at War	2005
Louis Gossett Jr.	President Ryan Gordon	Solar Attack	2005
Kelsey Grammer	President Andrew "Andy" Boone	Swing Vote	2008
Joseph Granby	President of the U.S.A.	Invasion, U.S.A.	1952
Bruce Greenwood	The President	National Treasure: Book of Secrets	2007
Bruce Greenwood	President of the United States	Kingsman: The Golden Circle	2017
Gene Hackman	President Alan Richmond	Absolute Power	1997
Gene Hackman	Former President Monroe E. Cole	Welcome to Mooseport	2004
Mark Harmon	President James Foster	Chasing Liberty	2004
Gregory Harrison	President Jonathan Hayes	First Daughter	1999
Gregory Harrison	President Jonathan Hayes	First Target	2000
Gregory Harrison	President Jonathan Hayes	First Shot	2002
Phil Hartman	President Dillard	The Second Civil War	1997
Jimmy Hayward	The President	Free Birds	2013
John Heard	President Ted Matthews	My Fellow Americans	1996
Jack Lemmon	President Russell P. Kramer	My Fellow Americans	1996
James Garner	President Matt Douglas	My Fellow Americans	1996
Dan Aykroyd	President William Haney	My Fellow Americans	1996
Edward Herrmann	President Arthur Fellwick	Atomic Train	1999
Hal Holbrook	President Adam Scott	The Kidnapping of the President	1980
Charles Howerton	President Calvin Clement	Assassination	1987
Peter Hudson	President Jeff Warnock	Lockout	2012
William Hurt	President Harry Ashton	Vantage Point	2008
Walter Huston	President Judd Hammond	Gabriel Over the White House	1933
Walter Huston	President of the United States	The Tunnel	1935
Samuel L. Jackson	President William Allan Moore	Big Game	2014
Kevin James	President William Cooper	Pixels	2015
Richard Jenkins	President Eli Raphelson (Assumed and Sworn)	White House Down	2013
James Earl Jones	President Douglass Dilman	The Man	1972
Christopher Jones	President Max Frost	Wild in the Streets	1968
James Karen	President Mitchell	Freedom Strike	1998
Michael Keaton	President John Mackenzie	First Daughter	2004
Perry King	President Richard Blake	The Day After Tomorrow	2004
Kenneth Welsh	President Raymond Becker	The Day After Tomorrow	2004
Ben Kingsley	President Gary Nance	Dave	1993
Kevin Kline	President William Harrison Mitchell	Dave	1993
Alexander Knox	President Hughes	Crack in the Mirror	1960
Kris Kristofferson	President John Francis Marshall	The Red Maple Leaf	2016
Ronald Lacey	President Widmark	The Adventures of Buckaroo Banzai Across the 8th Dimension	1984
Martin Landau	The President	By Dawn's Early Light	1990
Jan Kohout	President Joseph Kennedy Sr.	Fatherland	1994
Tom Lister, Jr.	President Lindberg	The Fifth Element	1997
George Lopez	President El. Bama	Meet the Blacks	2016
Charles Macaulay	The President	Splash	1984
Fredric March	President Jordan Lyman	Seven Days in May	1964
E. G. Marshall	The President	Superman II	1980
Christopher McDonald	The President	Spy Kids 2: The Island of Lost Dreams	2002
Christopher McDonald	President Neil Anami	We Can Be Heroes	2020
Donald Moffat	President Edward Bennett	Clear and Present Danger	1994
Zero Mostel	The President	Fore Play	1975
Michael Murphy	President Alvin Hammond (Assumed and Sworn)	White House Down	2013
James Naughton	President Davenport	First Kid	1996
Bob Newhart	President Manfred Link	First Family	1980
Jack Nicholson	President James Dale	Mars Attacks!	1996
Leslie Nielsen	President Baxter Harris	Scary Movie 3	2003
Leslie Nielsen	President Baxter Harris	Scary Movie 4	2005
Bob Odenkirk	President Chambers	Long Shot	2019
Michael Pate	The President	The Return of Captain Invincible	1984
Gregory Peck	The President	Amazing Grace and Chuck	1987
Gordon Pinsent	The President	Colossus: The Forbin Project	1970
Donald Pleasence	President White	Escape from New York	1981
Nick Offerman	The President	Civil War	2024
Dink O'Neal	President Patrick J. Sullivan	My Uncle the Alien	1996
Kevin Pollak	President Walter Emerson	Deterrence	1999
William Prince	The President	The Soldier	1982
Jonathan Pryce	The President	G.I. Joe: The Rise of Cobra	2009
Jonathan Pryce	The President	G.I. Joe: Retaliation	2012
Bill Pullman	President Thomas J. Whitmore	Independence Day	1996
Bill Pullman	President Thomas J. Whitmore	Independence Day: Resurgence	2016
William Fichtner	President Joshua T. Adams	Independence Day: Resurgence	2016
Dennis Quaid	President Joseph Staton	American Dreamz	2006
Randy Quaid	President A. Thorton Osgood II	Mail to the Chief	2000
David Rasche	President John Ballentine	The Sentinel	2006
James Rebhorn	President Signoff	The Adventures of Rocky and Bullwinkle	2000
John Ritter	President Chet Roosevelt	Americathon	1979
Tim Robbins	The President	Austin Powers: The Spy Who Shagged Me	1999
Eric Roberts	President Robert Woodruff	First Dog	2010
Cliff Robertson	President Jack Cahill	Escape from L.A.	1996
Chris Rock	President Mays Gilliam	Head of State	2003
William Sadler	President Matthew Ellis	Iron Man 3	2013
John Savage	President Desteno	Bermuda Tentacles	2014
Roy Scheider	The President	Chain of Command	2000
Roy Scheider	President Carlson	Executive Target	1997
Roy Scheider	President Robert Baker	The Peacekeeper	1997
Arnold Schwarzenegger	The President	Kung Fury 2	TBA
Peter Sellers	President Merkin Muffley	Dr. Strangelove	1964
Harry Shearer (voice)	President Arnold Schwarzenegger	The Simpsons Movie	2007
Charlie Sheen	President Rathcock	Machete Kills	2013
John Wesley Shipp	The President	Golden Shoes	2013
Cotter Smith	President McKenna	X2: X-Men United	2003
Josef Sommer	The President	X-Men: The Last Stand	2006
Brian d'Arcy James	The President	X-Men: Dark Phoenix	2019
Rod Steiger	The President	Captain Nuke and the Bomber Boys	1995
Lewis Stone	The President	Joe and Ethel Turp Call on the President	1939
Peter Strauss	President James Sanford	xXx: State of the Union	2004
Billy Bob Thornton	The President	Love Actually	2003
Franchot Tone	The President	Advise & Consent	1962
Lee Tracy	President Art Hockstader	The Best Man	1964
George Grizzard	President Lockwood	Wrong Is Right	1982
John Travolta	President Jack Stanton	Primary Colors	1998
Barry Bostwick	President Smith	National Lampoon's Men in White	1998
Ivan Volkman	The President	How to Succeed in Business Without Really Trying	1967
Jack Warden	President Roberts	Being There	1979
Sam Waterston	President William Foster	The Enemy Within	1994
Sam Waterston	President Edward Manchester	Shadow Conspiracy	1997
Hugh Wilson	The President (voice)	Guarding Tess	1994
Rutger Hauer	President Nelson	Scorcher	2002
John B. Thayer	The President	Blind Horizon	2003
Jack Scalia	The President	End Game	2006
Scott Williamson	President Lyman	Nothing But the Truth	2008
Jon Heese	U.S. President Earth Burger	Monster X Strikes Back: Attack the G8 Summit	2008
Andy Clemence	President Phillips	Air Collision	2012
Chris Shields	The President	Suddenly	2013
Patrick Wilson	The President (voice)	Batman v Superman: Dawn of Justice	2016
Sandy McCallum	Mr. President	Death Race 2000	1975
David Carradine	Mr. President Frankenstein	Death Race 2000	1975
Robin Williams	President Tom Dobbs	Man of the Year	2006
David Nichols	President Kellogg	Man of the Year	2006
Tom Butler	The President	Shooter	2007
Madison Mason	The President	Eagle Eye	2008
John Posey	The President	W.M.D.	2013
Kurt Sinclair	President Oliver	Independents' Day	2016
Raymond J. Barry	President Caleb Warrens	The Purge: Election Year	2016
Lochlyn Munro	President Thomas Bennett	Max 2: White House Hero	2017
Bradley Whitford	President Gray	The Darkest Minds	2018
Joel King	President Alex Morales	First Lady: A Modern Fairy Tale	2020
Benjamin Dane	President Taylor Brooks	First Lady: A Modern Fairy Tale	2020
Angus Macfadyen	President Willis Chatman Smoot	Steel Rain 2: Summit	2020
Stuart Milligan	The President of the United States	Wonder Woman 1984	2020
Victor Slezak	President Archer	The Independent	2022
Ian Bohen	President Edwards	Air Force One Down	2024
Steve Bullock	President John Hotham	War Game	2024
Charles Dance	President Edison Wolcott	Rumours	2024
John Cena	President Will Derringer	Heads of State	2025
Jim Meskimen	The President	War of the Worlds	2025
Idris Elba	The President	A House of Dynamite	2025
RuPaul	President Judy Gagwell	Stop! That! Train!	2026
John Goodman	The President of the United States	Digger	2026

=== Television ===
Actor	President	Program	Year
Tod Andrews	President Jeremy Haines	The President's Plane Is Missing (television film)	1973
Ted Atherton	President Walter Sheridan	XIII: The Conspiracy	2008
Ted Atherton	President Walter Sheridan	XIII: The Series	2011
Lew Ayres	President Charles Carter Durant	Earth II	1971
Matt Battaglia	President Thomas Christian	Too Close to Home	2016–2017
Richard Bekins	President Robert Richmond	Designated Survivor	2016
Sidney Blackmer	President William Lyons Selby	The Outer Limits ("The Hundred Days of the Dragon")	1963
Mike Bochetti	President Jimble	Smiling Friends	2024
Lloyd Bochner	President Mark Hayden	Loyal Opposition: Terror in the White House	1998
Powers Boothe	President Noah Daniels	24: Redemption	2007–2008
John Bourgeois	President Joseph Galbrain	XIII: The Conspiracy	2008
Bruce Boxleitner	President Baker	Supergirl	2018–2019
Beau Bridges	President Paul Hollister	10.5	2004
Beau Bridges	President Paul Hollister	10.5: Apocalypse	2006
Beau Bridges	President Hank Landry	Stargate SG-1	2007
Beau Bridges	President Ralph Warner	Homeland	2020
Alan Dale	President Morse	Homeland	2017
Sam Trammell	President Ben Hayes	Homeland	2020
Keith Carradine	President Conrad Dalton	Madam Secretary	2014–2019
Gary Cole	President Mike Brady	The Brady Bunch in the White House (television film)	2003
Dabney Coleman	President George Richmond	My Date with the President's Daughter (television film)	1998
Ronny Cox	President Robert Kinsey	Stargate SG-1	2001
Peter Coyote	President Dave Segovia	FlashForward	2009
Steven Culp	President Edward Taylor	Impact	2009
Steven Culp	President Joshua Reiss	The Last Ship	2018
Michael Cusack (voice)	President Mr. Frog	Smiling Friends	2024
Mark Moses	President Jeffrey "Jeff" Michener	The Last Ship	2015–2016
John Cothran	President Howard Oliver	The Last Ship	2016–2017
John D'Aquino	President Richard Martinez	Cory in the House	2007–2008
Brian Dennehy	U.S. President	Voyage of Terror (Television movie)	1998
William Devane	President Henry Hayes	Stargate SG-1	2003–2007
William Devane	President James Heller	24: Live Another Day	2014
Michael Dorn	The President	Heroes (NBC)	2008–2010
Christopher B. Duncan	President William Johnson	The First Family	2012–2015
Paul Fitzgerald	President Perry Morgan	The Residence	2025
Robert Foxworth	President Charles Halsey	The Outer Limits ("Trial By Fire")	1996
Paul Frees	President James Norcross / Super President	Super President	1967
Michael Gaston	President Andrew Pickett	Jack Ryan	2018
David Bedella	President Charles Bachler	Jack Ryan	2022–2023
Tony Goldwyn	President Fitzgerald Thomas Grant III	Scandal	2012–2017
Ricardo Chavira	President-elect Frankie Vargas	Scandal	2017
Andy Griffith	President Esker Scott Anderson	Washington: Behind Closed Doors	1977
Jason Robards	President Richard Monckton	Washington: Behind Closed Doors	1977
Hal Holbrook	President Maxwell Monroe	Under Siege	1986
Michael Moriarty	President Paul Ellison	Windmills of the Gods	1988
Eric Pierpoint	President Jefferson Williams	Sliders ("A Current Affair")	1999
Harry Hamlin	President Bob Kempers	Quarantine	2000
Alex Hirsch	President Sir Lord Quentin Trembley III, Esq.	Gravity Falls	2012
Ernie Hudson	President Westwood	Stealth Fighter	1999
Rock Hudson	The President	World War III	1982
Peter Jason	President Demsky	Alien Apocalypse (television film)	2005
Rolf Kanies	President Reginald J. Priest	Lexx	1997–2002
Ken Kercheval	President Cliff Barnes	Dallas ("Conundrum")	1991
Logan Lerman	President Robert McCallister	Jack & Bobby	2004–2005
Will Lyman	President Theodore Roosevelt (Teddy) Bridges	Commander in Chief	2005
Donald Sutherland	Acting President Nathan Templeton	Commander in Chief ("The Elephant in the Room")	2006
David Rasche	President Whitman	DAG	2000-2001
William H. Macy	The President	The Unit	2007
Benito Martinez	President Benjamin Castillo	The Unit	2009
Benito Martinez	President Alvarez	Shooter ("Patron Saint")	2018
Benito Martinez	President Robert Diaz	The Blacklist	2019
Stephen McHattie	President Ben Carrington	XIII: The Series	2011–2012
Barry Morse	President Johnny Cyclops	Whoops Apocalypse	1982
Esai Morales	President Julian Navarro	The Brink	2015
Dermot Mulroney	President John Young	Messiah	2020
Dermot Mulroney	President Ritson	Secret Invasion	2023
James Naughton	President Paul Kincaid	Hostages	2013
Nick Nolte	President Richard Graves	Graves	2016–2017
Trey Parker (voice)	President Herbert Garrison	South Park	2016–present
Adrian Pasdar	President Paul Garcetti	Political Animals	2012
Dylan Baker	President Fred Collier	Political Animals	2012
Rob Paulsen (voice)	President Ulysses D.F.M. Pinky	Pinky and the Brain	1996
Dennis Haysbert	President David Palmer	24	2002–2004
Gregory Itzin	President Charles Logan	24	2005–2006
Ray Wise	President Hal Gardner	24	2006–2007
D.B. Woodside	President Wayne Palmer	24	2007
Geoff Pierson	President John Keeler	24	2005
Geoff Pierson	President Wayne Banning	Sabrina, the Teenage Witch	2001
Geoff Pierson	Former President Cornelius Moss	Designated Survivor	2017
Robert Pine	Former President Stevenson	Veep	2017
Richard Pryor	The 40th President of the United States	The Richard Pryor Show	1977
Bill Pullman	President Dale Gilchrist	1600 Penn	2013
Ford Rainey	U.S. President	Voyage to the Bottom of the Sea	1964–1965
Ford Rainey	The President	Lost in Space	1965
Claude Rains	President Paul Westman	The Alcoa Hour ("The President")	1956
Sam Richardson	President Richard Splett	Veep	2014–2019
Mark Roberts	The President	Highway to Heaven ("Merry Christmas from Grandpa")	1989
Sasha Roiz	President Monroe Bennett	Salvation	2017
Santiago Cabrera	President Darius Tanz	Salvation	2018
James Lesure	President Trey Thompson	Salvation	2018
William Sadler	President Matthew Ellis	Agents of S.H.I.E.L.D.	2015–2016
Ricky Schroder	The President	Silver Spoons	1983
James Whitmore	President Sam Baker	Favorite Son	1988
George C. Scott	President Samuel A. Tresch	Mr. President	1987–1988
John Shea	President Thomas Eckhart	Agent X	2015
Martin Sheen	President Josiah Bartlet	The West Wing	1999–2006
John Goodman	Acting President Glen Allen Walken	The West Wing	2003
James Cromwell	Former President D. Wire Newman	The West Wing	2004
Jimmy Smits	President Matthew Santos	The West Wing	2006
Kevin Spacey	Former President Francis Joseph "Frank" Underwood	House of Cards	2014–2017
Michel Gill	Former President Garrett Allen Walker	House of Cards	2013–2014, 2016–2017
Reed Birney	Acting President Donald Blythe	House of Cards	2016
Richard Widmark	President Paul Roudebush	Vanished (TV mini-series)	1971
Robin Gammell	President Stuart Hammel	Majority Rule (TV movie)	1992
Colin Stinton	President Arthur Colman Winters	Doctor Who ("The Sound of Drums")	2007
Blair Underwood	President Elias Martinez	The Event (NBC)	2010
Bill Smitrovich	President Raymond Jarvis	The Event (NBC)	2011
Steven Williams	U.S. President	seaQuest DSV (NBC)	1994
Fred Willard	President Federick R. Garner	Lois & Clark: The New Adventures of Superman	1996–1997
Ralph Waite	President Mathews	The President's Man (television film)	2000
Robert Urich	President Adam Mayfield	The President's Man: A Line In The Sand (television film)	2002
Michael McConnohie	President Cole (English voice dub)	R.O.D the TV	2003–2004
Philip Akin	President Monroe	H_{2}O	2004
Ray Baker	The President	Alien Siege	2005
Tom Skerritt	President Stanfield	The Trojan Horse	2008
Daniel J. Travanti	President Richard Mills	Prison Break	2005
Christopher Plummer	President P. J. Aimes	The Summit	2008
Jacob Tremblay	President Oliver Foley	The Twilight Zone ("The Wunderkind")	2019
"Weird Al" Yankovic	President Stuntcastin	The Aquabats! Super Show!	2012
Cameron Daddo	President Charles Grayson	Nikita	2012
Peter Martorano	The President of the United States	Last Resort	2013
John Allen Nelson	President Devore	Crisis	2014
Keith David	President Andre Curtis (voice)	Rick and Morty	2015–present
Stephen Lobo	President Davis Park	Van Helsing	2021
Noah Wyle	President Tom Mason	Falling Skies	2012–2013
Stephen Collins	President Benjamin Hathaway	Falling Skies	2013
Yul Vazquez	President Thomas Westwood	The Lottery	2014
David Chisum	President Jefferson Rooney	Supernatural ("LOTUS")	2016
Kiefer Sutherland	President Thomas Adam Kirkman	Designated Survivor	2016–2019
Jerry Wasserman	The President	The Flash ("Invasion!")	2016
Danny Johnson	President Todd	Quantico	2016
Dennis Boutsikaris	President Henry Roarke	Quantico	2017
Rob MacPherson	President Larry Kerr	Pine Gap	2018
Ed Quinn	President Hunter Franklin	The Oval	2019–2024
Paul Gross	President Ted Campbell	Y: The Last Man	2021
Sasha Roiz	President Arthur Wright	The Endgame	2022
Michael McKean	President William Rayburn	The Diplomat	2023–2024
Devon Sawa	President James Collins	Chucky	2023–2024
Jim Beaver	President-elect Robert Singer	The Boys	2024
David Andrews	President Steven Calhoun	The Boys	2024
Robert De Niro	Former President George Mullen	Zero Day	2025
James Marsden	President Cal Bradford	Paradise	2025
Paul Fitzgerald	President Perry Morgan	The Residence	2025
James Remar	President Paul Barnard	Trinity	2026
Randy Oglesby	President James Bragg	For All Mankind	2026

=== Video games ===
Actor	President	Game	Year
Arthur Holden	President David Bowers	Tom Clancy's Splinter Cell	2002
Ryan Drees	President Michael Wilson	Metal Wolf Chaos	2004
Ray Wise	President Michael Dugan	Command & Conquer: Red Alert 2	2000
J.K. Simmons	President Howard T. Ackerman	Command & Conquer: Red Alert 3	2008
Michael Donovan	President Adam Benford	Resident Evil 6	2012

== Female actors who played fictional presidents ==
=== Films ===
Actress	President	Film	Year
Ernestine Barrier	Madame President	Project Moonbase	1953
Polly Bergen	President Leslie McCloud	Kisses for My President	1964
Loretta Swit	President Barbara Adams	Whoops Apocalypse	1986
Joan Rivers	President Rivers	Les Patterson Saves the World	1987
Natalie Portman	President Taffy Dale	Mars Attacks!	1996
Elizabeth Wilson	President Elizabeth Richardson	Special Report: Journey to Mars	1996
Christina Applegate	President Diane Steen	Mafia!	1998
Sally Champlin	The President	The Woman Every Man Wants (aka Perfect Lover)	2001
Meredith Baxter	President Harriet Franklin	Airline Disaster	2010
Stephanie Paul	The President	Iron Sky	2012
Stephanie Paul	The President	Iron Sky: The Coming Race	2019
Penny Johnson Jerald	President Amanda Waller (voice)	Justice League: Gods and Monsters	2015
Jennifer Wiltsie	The President (voice)	Capture the Flag	2015
Sela Ward	President Elizabeth Lanford	Independence Day: Resurgence	2016
Fay Gauthier	President Raney	Independents' Day	2016
Jamie Lee Curtis	President Rachel Burke	An Acceptable Loss	2018
Caroline Goodall	President Ilene Dover	Hunter Killer	2018
Charlize Theron	President Charlotte Field	Long Shot	2019
Jean Smart	President Monahan	Superintelligence	2020
Meryl Streep	President Janie Orlean	Don't Look Up	2021
Zoe Carides	President Wallace	Interceptor	2022
Uma Thurman	President Ellen Claremont	Red, White & Royal Blue	2023
Sean Young	President Powell	DC Down	2023
Jemma Redgrave	President Jessica Danforth	The Beekeeper	2024
Viola Davis	President Danielle Sutton	G20	2025
Angela Bassett	President Erika Sloane	Mission: Impossible – The Final Reckoning	2025
Gail O'Grady	President Kat Collins	President Down	2025

=== Television ===
Actress	President	Program	Year
Patty Duke	President Julia Mansfield	Hail to the Chief	1985
Teresa Barnwell	President Hillary Clinton	Sliders ("The Weaker Sex")	1995
Melissa Altro (voice)	President Mary Alice Crosswire ((Muffy))	Arthur	2000
Yeardley Smith (voice)	President Lisa Simpson	The Simpsons ("Bart to the Future")	2000
Geena Davis	President Mackenzie Allen	Commander in Chief	2005–2006
Peggy Frankston	President Hillary Clinton	L'État de Grace	2006
Patricia Wettig	President Caroline Reynolds	Prison Break	2006
Anjelica Huston	President Castilla	Covert One: The Hades Factor	2006
Cherry Jones	President Allison Taylor	24	2008–2010
Mimi Kuzyk	President Sally Sheridan	XIII: The Conspiracy	2008
Ingrid Kavelaars	President Harriet Traymore	XIII: The Series	2012
Michelle Nolden	President Kathleen Spencer	Nikita	2012–2013
Kate Burton	Acting President Sally M. Langston	Scandal	2013
Linda Hamilton	President Harriet Rowntree	Air Force One Is Down	2013
Gloria Reuben	President Marina Peralta	Falling Skies	2013
Deborah May	President Geller	The Last Ship	2014
Alfre Woodard	President Constance Payton	State of Affairs	2014–2015
Téa Leoni	President Elizabeth Adams McCord	Madam Secretary	2014–2019
Sharon Stone	Acting President Natalie Maccabee	Agent X	2015
Lucia Walters	President Susan Brayden	DC's Legends of Tomorrow ("Invasion!")	2016
Lynda Carter	President Olivia Marsdin	Supergirl	2016–2018
Elizabeth Marvel	President Elizabeth Keane	Homeland	2016–2018
Tovah Feldshuh	President Pauline Mackenzie	Salvation	2017
Charmin Lee	Madame President	Sleepy Hollow	2017
Julia Louis-Dreyfus	Former President Selina Meyer	Veep	2014–2019
Andrea Savage	President Laura P. Montez	Veep	2016–2019
Toks Olagundoye	President Kemi Talbot	Veep	2019
Marcia Cross	President Claire Haas	Quantico	2016-2017
Kim Cattrall	President Helen Tyler	Modus	2017
Robin Wright	President Claire Underwood	House of Cards	2017–2018
Bellamy Young	President Melody "Mellie" Grant	Scandal	2017–2018
Jeannie Berlin	President Cecily Burke	The First	2018
Jill Teed	President Archer	Van Helsing	2019
Jodi Balfour	President Ellen Wilson	For All Mankind	2019–2025
Gina Rodriguez	President Elena Cañero-Reed	Diary of a Future President	2020–2021
Diane Lane	President Jennifer Brown	Y: The Last Man	2021
Kari Matchett	President Michelle Travers	The Night Agent	2023
Angela Bassett	President Mitchell	Zero Day	2025
Allison Janney	President Grace Penn	The Diplomat	2024–present

=== Video games ===
Actor	President	Game	Year
Lynne Adams	President Patricia Caldwell	Tom Clancy's Splinter Cell: Conviction	2010
Mimi Kuzyk	President Patricia Caldwell	Tom Clancy's Splinter Cell: Blacklist	2013
Lee Meriwether	President Elizabeth Winters	Vanquish	2010
Cira Larkin	President Marion Bosworth	Call of Duty: Black Ops II	2012
Christina Batman	President Cristina Warren	Detroit: Become Human	2018
Kay Bess	President Rosalind Myers	Cyberpunk 2077: Phantom Liberty	2023

== Awards ==
=== Real presidents ===
==== Awards by president portrayed ====
President portrayed	Ceremony	Award	Nominations	Wins	Totals
George Washington	Primetime Emmy Awards (1 nomination, 0 wins)	Outstanding Supporting Actor in a Miniseries or a Movie	1	0	2 nominations, 0 wins
George Washington	Tony Awards (1 nomination, 0 wins)	Best Featured Actor in a Musical	1	0	2 nominations, 0 wins
John Adams	Golden Globe Awards (1 nomination, 1 win)	Best Actor – Miniseries or Television Film	1	1	7 nominations, 5 wins
John Adams	Primetime Emmy Awards (2 nominations, 1 win)	Outstanding Lead Actor in a Limited Series	1	0	7 nominations, 5 wins
John Adams	Primetime Emmy Awards (2 nominations, 1 win)	Outstanding Lead Actor in a Miniseries or a Movie	1	1	7 nominations, 5 wins
John Adams	Satellite Awards (1 nomination, 1 win)	Best Actor – Miniseries or Television Film	1	1	7 nominations, 5 wins
John Adams	Screen Actors Guild Awards (1 nomination, 1 win)	Outstanding Performance by a Male Actor in a Miniseries or Television Movie	1	1	7 nominations, 5 wins
John Adams	TCA Awards (1 nomination, 1 win)	Individual Achievement in Drama	1	1	7 nominations, 5 wins
John Adams	Tony Awards (1 nomination, 0 wins)	Best Featured Actor in a Musical	1	0	7 nominations, 5 wins
Thomas Jefferson	Primetime Emmy Awards (2 nominations, 0 wins)	Outstanding Supporting Actor in a Miniseries or a Movie	2	0	4 nominations, 1 win
Thomas Jefferson	Screen Actors Guild Awards (1 nomination, 0 wins)	Outstanding Performance by a Male Actor in a Miniseries or Television Movie	1	0	4 nominations, 1 win
Thomas Jefferson	Tony Awards (1 nomination, 1 win)	Best Featured Actor in a Musical	1	1	4 nominations, 1 win
John Quincy Adams	Academy Awards (1 nomination, 0 wins)	Best Supporting Actor	1	0	4 nominations, 1 win
John Quincy Adams	Critics' Choice Movie Awards (1 nomination, 1 win)	Best Supporting Actor	1	1	4 nominations, 1 win
John Quincy Adams	Golden Globe Awards (1 nomination, 0 wins)	Best Supporting Actor – Motion Picture	1	0	4 nominations, 1 win
John Quincy Adams	Screen Actors Guild Awards (1 nomination, 0 wins)	Outstanding Performance by a Male Actor in a Supporting Role	1	0	4 nominations, 1 win
Abraham Lincoln	Academy Awards (2 nominations, 1 win)	Best Actor	2	1	12 nominations, 5 wins
Abraham Lincoln	Critics' Choice Movie Awards (2 nominations, 1 win)	Best Acting Ensemble	1	0	12 nominations, 5 wins
Abraham Lincoln	Critics' Choice Movie Awards (2 nominations, 1 win)	Best Actor	1	1	12 nominations, 5 wins
Abraham Lincoln	Golden Globe Awards (1 nomination, 1 win)	Best Actor – Motion Picture Drama	1	1	12 nominations, 5 wins
Abraham Lincoln	MTV Movie Awards (1 nomination, 0 wins)	Best Performance	1	0	12 nominations, 5 wins
Abraham Lincoln	Primetime Emmy Awards (1 nomination, 1 win)	Outstanding Lead Actor in a Limited Series	1	1	12 nominations, 5 wins
Abraham Lincoln	Satellite Awards (2 nominations, 0 wins)	Best Actor – Motion Picture Drama	1	0	12 nominations, 5 wins
Abraham Lincoln	Satellite Awards (2 nominations, 0 wins)	Best Supporting Actor – Series, Miniseries or Television Film	1	0	12 nominations, 5 wins
Abraham Lincoln	Screen Actors Guild Awards (2 nominations, 1 win)	Outstanding Performance by a Cast in a Motion Picture	1	0	12 nominations, 5 wins
Abraham Lincoln	Screen Actors Guild Awards (2 nominations, 1 win)	Outstanding Performance by a Male Actor in a Leading Role	1	1	12 nominations, 5 wins
Abraham Lincoln	Tony Awards (1 nomination, 0 wins)	Best Actor in a Play	1	0	12 nominations, 5 wins
Woodrow Wilson	Academy Awards (1 nomination, 0 wins)	Best Actor	1	0	3 nominations, 1 win
Woodrow Wilson	Golden Globe Awards (1 nomination, 1 win)	Best Actor in a Leading Role	1	1	3 nominations, 1 win
Woodrow Wilson	Primetime Emmy Awards (1 nomination, 0 wins)	Outstanding Supporting Actor in a Limited Series or a Special	1	0	3 nominations, 1 win
Calvin Coolidge	Primetime Emmy Awards (1 nomination, 0 wins)	Outstanding Supporting Actor in a Limited Series or a Special	1	0	1 nomination, 0 wins
Franklin D. Roosevelt	Golden Globe Awards (2 nominations, 0 wins)	Best Actor – Miniseries or Television Film	1	0	9 nominations, 0 wins
Franklin D. Roosevelt	Golden Globe Awards (2 nominations, 0 wins)	Best Actor – Motion Picture Musical or Comedy	1	0	9 nominations, 0 wins
Franklin D. Roosevelt	Primetime Emmy Awards (5 nominations, 0 wins)	Outstanding Lead Actor in a Limited Series or a Special	1	0	9 nominations, 0 wins
Franklin D. Roosevelt	Primetime Emmy Awards (5 nominations, 0 wins)	Outstanding Lead Actor in a Miniseries or a Movie	1	0	9 nominations, 0 wins
Franklin D. Roosevelt	Primetime Emmy Awards (5 nominations, 0 wins)	Outstanding Lead Actor in a Special Program – Drama or Comedy	2	0	9 nominations, 0 wins
Franklin D. Roosevelt	Primetime Emmy Awards (5 nominations, 0 wins)	Outstanding Supporting Actor in a Miniseries or a Movie	1	0	9 nominations, 0 wins
Franklin D. Roosevelt	Satellite Awards (1 nomination, 0 wins)	Best Actor – Miniseries or Television Film	1	0	9 nominations, 0 wins
Franklin D. Roosevelt	Screen Actors Guild Awards (1 nomination, 0 wins)	Outstanding Performance by a Male Actor in a Miniseries or Television Movie	1	0	9 nominations, 0 wins
Harry S. Truman	Academy Awards (1 nomination, 0 wins)	Best Actor	1	0	6 nominations, 3 wins
Harry S. Truman	Golden Globe Awards (2 nominations, 1 win)	Best Actor – Drama	1	0	6 nominations, 3 wins
Harry S. Truman	Golden Globe Awards (2 nominations, 1 win)	Best Actor – Miniseries or Television Film	1	1	6 nominations, 3 wins
Harry S. Truman	Primetime Emmy Awards (2 nominations, 1 win)	Outstanding Lead Actor in a Miniseries or a Special	1	0	6 nominations, 3 wins
Harry S. Truman	Primetime Emmy Awards (2 nominations, 1 win)	Outstanding Lead Actor in a Special Program – Drama or Comedy	1	1	6 nominations, 3 wins
Harry S. Truman	Screen Actors Guild Awards (1 nomination, 1 win)	Outstanding Performance by a Male Actor in a Miniseries or Television Movie	1	1	6 nominations, 3 wins
Dwight D. Eisenhower	Critics' Choice Movie Awards (1 nomination, 0 wins)	Best Acting Ensemble	1	0	2 nominations, 0 wins
Dwight D. Eisenhower	Screen Actors Guild Awards (1 nomination, 0 wins)	Outstanding Performance by a Cast in a Motion Picture	1	0	2 nominations, 0 wins
John F. Kennedy	Critics' Choice Movie Awards (1 nomination, 0 wins)	Best Acting Ensemble	1	0	8 nominations, 1 win
John F. Kennedy	Golden Globe Awards (1 nominations, 0 wins)	Best Actor – Miniseries or Television Film	1	0	8 nominations, 1 win
John F. Kennedy	Primetime Emmy Awards (2 nominations, 0 wins)	Outstanding Lead Actor in a Miniseries or a Movie	1	0	8 nominations, 1 win
John F. Kennedy	Primetime Emmy Awards (2 nominations, 0 wins)	Outstanding Lead Actor in a Special Program – Drama or Comedy	1	0	8 nominations, 1 win
John F. Kennedy	Satellite Awards (1 nomination, 1 win)	Best Supporting Actor – Motion Picture Drama	1	1	8 nominations, 1 win
John F. Kennedy	Screen Actors Guild Awards (3 nominations, 0 wins)	Outstanding Performance by a Cast in a Motion Picture	1	0	8 nominations, 1 win
John F. Kennedy	Screen Actors Guild Awards (3 nominations, 0 wins)	Outstanding Performance by a Male Actor in a Miniseries or Television Movie	2	0	8 nominations, 1 win
Lyndon B. Johnson	Critics' Choice Movie Awards (3 nominations, 0 wins)	Best Acting Ensemble	2	0	13 nominations, 4 wins
Lyndon B. Johnson	Critics' Choice Movie Awards (3 nominations, 0 wins)	Best Actor in a Movie/Miniseries	1	0	13 nominations, 4 wins
Lyndon B. Johnson	Golden Globe Awards (2 nominations, 1 win)	Best Actor – Miniseries or Television Film	2	1	13 nominations, 4 wins
Lyndon B. Johnson	Primetime Emmy Awards (3 nominations, 0 wins)	Outstanding Lead Actor in a Limited Series or a Movie	1	0	13 nominations, 4 wins
Lyndon B. Johnson	Primetime Emmy Awards (3 nominations, 0 wins)	Outstanding Lead Actor in a Miniseries or a Movie	1	0	13 nominations, 4 wins
Lyndon B. Johnson	Primetime Emmy Awards (3 nominations, 0 wins)	Outstanding Lead Actor in a Miniseries or a Special	1	0	13 nominations, 4 wins
Lyndon B. Johnson	Satellite Awards (1 nomination, 1 win)	Best Actor – Miniseries or Television Film	1	1	13 nominations, 4 wins
Lyndon B. Johnson	Screen Actors Guild Awards (2 nominations, 1 win)	Outstanding Performance by a Cast in a Motion Picture	1	0	13 nominations, 4 wins
Lyndon B. Johnson	Screen Actors Guild Awards (2 nominations, 1 win)	Outstanding Performance by a Male Actor in a Miniseries or Television Movie	1	1	13 nominations, 4 wins
Lyndon B. Johnson	TCA Awards (1 nomination, 0 wins)	Individual Achievement in Drama	1	0	13 nominations, 4 wins
Lyndon B. Johnson	Tony Awards (1 nomination, 1 win)	Best Actor in a Play	1	1	13 nominations, 4 wins
Richard Nixon	Academy Awards (2 nominations, 0 wins)	Best Actor	2	0	15 nominations, 1 win
Richard Nixon	Critics' Choice Movie Awards (2 nominations, 0 wins)	Best Acting Ensemble	1	0	15 nominations, 1 win
Richard Nixon	Critics' Choice Movie Awards (2 nominations, 0 wins)	Best Actor	1	0	15 nominations, 1 win
Richard Nixon	Golden Globe Awards (2 nominations, 0 wins)	Best Actor – Motion Picture Drama	2	0	15 nominations, 1 win
Richard Nixon	Primetime Emmy Awards (1 nominations, 0 wins)	Outstanding Lead Actor in a Miniseries or a Special	1	0	15 nominations, 1 win
Richard Nixon	Satellite Awards (2 nominations, 0 wins)	Best Actor – Motion Picture Drama	1	0	15 nominations, 1 win
Richard Nixon	Satellite Awards (2 nominations, 0 wins)	Best Supporting Actor – Motion Picture Musical or Comedy	1	0	15 nominations, 1 win
Richard Nixon	Screen Actors Guild Awards (5 nominations, 0 wins)	Outstanding Performance by a Cast in a Motion Picture	3	0	15 nominations, 1 win
Richard Nixon	Screen Actors Guild Awards (5 nominations, 0 wins)	Outstanding Performance by a Male Actor in a Leading Role	2	0	15 nominations, 1 win
Richard Nixon	Tony Awards (1 nomination, 1 win)	Best Actor in a Play	1	1	15 nominations, 1 win
Ronald Reagan	Critics' Choice Movie Awards (2 nominations, 0 wins)	Best Acting Ensemble	1	0	4 nominations, 0 wins
Ronald Reagan	Critics' Choice Movie Awards (2 nominations, 0 wins)	Best Actor in a Movie/Miniseries	1	0	4 nominations, 0 wins
Ronald Reagan	Primetime Emmy Awards (1 nominations, 0 wins)	Outstanding Lead Actor in a Miniseries or a Movie	1	0	4 nominations, 0 wins
Ronald Reagan	Screen Actors Guild Awards (1 nomination, 0 wins)	Outstanding Performance by a Cast in a Motion Picture	1	0	4 nominations, 0 wins
Bill Clinton	Golden Globe Awards (1 nomination, 0 wins)	Best Actor – Miniseries or Television Film	1	0	4 nominations, 0 wins
Bill Clinton	Primetime Emmy Awards (1 nomination, 0 wins)	Outstanding Lead Actor in a Miniseries or a Movie	1	0	4 nominations, 0 wins
Bill Clinton	Satellite Awards (1 nomination, 0 wins)	Best Actor – Miniseries or Television Film	1	0	4 nominations, 0 wins
Bill Clinton	Screen Actors Guild Awards (1 nomination, 0 wins)	Outstanding Performance by a Male Actor in a Miniseries or Television Movie	1	0	4 nominations, 0 wins
George W. Bush	Academy Awards (1 nomination, 0 wins)	Best Supporting Actor	1	0	4 nominations, 0 wins
George W. Bush	Critics' Choice Movie Awards (1 nomination, 0 wins)	Best Acting Ensemble	1	0	4 nominations, 0 wins
George W. Bush	Golden Globe Awards (1 nomination, 0 wins)	Best Supporting Actor – Motion Picture	1	0	4 nominations, 0 wins
George W. Bush	Satellite Awards (1 nomination, 0 wins)	Best Actor – Motion Picture Musical or Comedy	1	0	4 nominations, 0 wins
Donald Trump	Critics' Choice Television Awards (1 nomination, 1 win)	Best Guest Performer in a Comedy Series	1	1	5 nominations, 2 wins
Donald Trump	Golden Globe Awards (1 nomination, 0 wins)	Best Supporting Actor – Series, Miniseries or Television Film	1	0	5 nominations, 2 wins
Donald Trump	Primetime Emmy Awards (3 nominations, 1 win)	Outstanding Guest Actor in a Comedy Series	1	0	5 nominations, 2 wins
Donald Trump	Primetime Emmy Awards (3 nominations, 1 win)	Outstanding Supporting Actor in a Comedy Series	2	1	5 nominations, 2 wins
Totals	Academy Awards (8 nominations, 1 win)	Best Actor	6	1	101 nominations, 24 wins
Totals	Academy Awards (8 nominations, 1 win)	Best Supporting Actor	2	0	101 nominations, 24 wins
Totals	Critics' Choice Movie Awards (11 nominations, 2 wins)	Best Acting Ensemble	8	0	101 nominations, 24 wins
Totals	Critics' Choice Movie Awards (11 nominations, 2 wins)	Best Actor	2	1	101 nominations, 24 wins
Totals	Critics' Choice Movie Awards (11 nominations, 2 wins)	Best Supporting Actor	1	1	101 nominations, 24 wins
Totals	Critics' Choice Television Awards (2 nominations, 1 win)	Best Actor in a Movie/Miniseries	2	0	101 nominations, 24 wins
Totals	Critics' Choice Television Awards (2 nominations, 1 win)	Best Guest Performer in a Comedy Series	1	1	101 nominations, 24 wins
Totals	Golden Globe Awards (15 nominations, 5 wins)	Best Actor – Drama	1	0	101 nominations, 24 wins
Totals	Golden Globe Awards (15 nominations, 5 wins)	Best Actor in a Leading Role	1	1	101 nominations, 24 wins
Totals	Golden Globe Awards (15 nominations, 5 wins)	Best Actor – Miniseries or Television Film	7	3	101 nominations, 24 wins
Totals	Golden Globe Awards (15 nominations, 5 wins)	Best Actor – Motion Picture Drama	3	1	101 nominations, 24 wins
Totals	Golden Globe Awards (15 nominations, 5 wins)	Best Actor – Motion Picture Musical or Comedy	1	0	101 nominations, 24 wins
Totals	Golden Globe Awards (15 nominations, 5 wins)	Best Supporting Actor – Motion Picture	2	0	101 nominations, 24 wins
Totals	MTV Movie Awards (1 nomination, 0 wins)	Best Performance	1	0	101 nominations, 24 wins
Totals	Primetime Emmy Awards (26 nominations, 4 wins)	Outstanding Guest Actor in a Comedy Series	1	0	101 nominations, 24 wins
Totals	Primetime Emmy Awards (26 nominations, 4 wins)	Outstanding Lead Actor in a Limited Series	2	1	101 nominations, 24 wins
Totals	Primetime Emmy Awards (26 nominations, 4 wins)	Outstanding Lead Actor in a Limited Series or a Movie	1	0	101 nominations, 24 wins
Totals	Primetime Emmy Awards (26 nominations, 4 wins)	Outstanding Lead Actor in a Limited Series or a Special	1	0	101 nominations, 24 wins
Totals	Primetime Emmy Awards (26 nominations, 4 wins)	Outstanding Lead Actor in a Miniseries or a Movie	6	1	101 nominations, 24 wins
Totals	Primetime Emmy Awards (26 nominations, 4 wins)	Outstanding Lead Actor in a Miniseries or a Special	3	0	101 nominations, 24 wins
Totals	Primetime Emmy Awards (26 nominations, 4 wins)	Outstanding Lead Actor in a Special Program – Drama or Comedy	4	1	101 nominations, 24 wins
Totals	Primetime Emmy Awards (26 nominations, 4 wins)	Outstanding Supporting Actor in a Comedy Series	2	1	101 nominations, 24 wins
Totals	Primetime Emmy Awards (26 nominations, 4 wins)	Outstanding Supporting Actor in a Limited Series or a Special	2	0	101 nominations, 24 wins
Totals	Primetime Emmy Awards (26 nominations, 4 wins)	Outstanding Supporting Actor in a Miniseries or a Movie	4	0	101 nominations, 24 wins
Totals	Satellite Awards (9 nominations, 3 wins)	Best Actor – Miniseries or Television Film	4	2	101 nominations, 24 wins
Totals	Satellite Awards (9 nominations, 3 wins)	Best Actor – Motion Picture Drama	2	0	101 nominations, 24 wins
Totals	Satellite Awards (9 nominations, 3 wins)	Best Actor – Motion Picture Musical or Comedy	1	0	101 nominations, 24 wins
Totals	Satellite Awards (9 nominations, 3 wins)	Best Supporting Actor – Motion Picture Drama	1	1	101 nominations, 24 wins
Totals	Satellite Awards (9 nominations, 3 wins)	Best Supporting Actor – Motion Picture Musical or Comedy	1	0	101 nominations, 24 wins
Totals	Screen Actors Guild Awards (20 nominations, 4 wins)	Outstanding Performance by a Cast in a Motion Picture	8	0	101 nominations, 24 wins
Totals	Screen Actors Guild Awards (20 nominations, 4 wins)	Outstanding Performance by a Male Actor in a Leading Role	3	1	101 nominations, 24 wins
Totals	Screen Actors Guild Awards (20 nominations, 4 wins)	Outstanding Performance by a Male Actor in a Miniseries or Television Movie	7	3	101 nominations, 24 wins
Totals	Screen Actors Guild Awards (20 nominations, 4 wins)	Outstanding Performance by a Male Actor in a Supporting Role	1	0	101 nominations, 24 wins
Totals	Screen Actors Guild Awards (20 nominations, 4 wins)	Outstanding Performance by a Male Actor in a Miniseries or Television Movie	1	0	101 nominations, 24 wins
Totals	TCA Awards(2 nominations, 1 win)	Individual Achievement in Drama	2	1	101 nominations, 24 wins
Totals	Tony Awards (6 nominations, 3 wins)	Best Featured Actor in a Musical	3	1	101 nominations, 24 wins
Totals	Tony Awards (6 nominations, 3 wins)	Best Actor in a Play	3	2	101 nominations, 24 wins

==== Academy Awards ====
Year	Category	President	Nominee	Film	Result
1941	Best Actor	Abraham Lincoln	Raymond Massey	Abe Lincoln in Illinois	Nominated
1945	Best Actor	Woodrow Wilson	Alexander Knox	Wilson	Nominated
1976	Best Actor	Harry S. Truman	James Whitmore	Give 'em Hell, Harry!	Nominated
1996	Best Actor	Richard Nixon	Anthony Hopkins	Nixon	Nominated
1998	Best Supporting Actor	John Quincy Adams	Anthony Hopkins	Amistad	Nominated
2009	Best Actor	Richard Nixon	Frank Langella	Frost/Nixon	Nominated
2013	Best Actor	Abraham Lincoln	Daniel Day-Lewis	Lincoln	Won
2019	Best Supporting Actor	George W. Bush	Sam Rockwell	Vice	Nominated
2025	Best Actor	Donald Trump	Sebastian Stan	The Apprentice	Nominated

==== Critics' Choice Movie Awards ====
Year	Category	President	Nominee	Film	Result
1998	Best Supporting Actor	John Quincy Adams	Anthony Hopkins	Amistad	Won
2009	Best Actor	Richard Nixon	Frank Langella	Frost/Nixon	Nominated
2013	Best Actor	Abraham Lincoln	Daniel Day-Lewis	Lincoln	Won
2013	Best Acting Ensemble	Abraham Lincoln	Daniel Day-Lewis	Lincoln	Nominated
2014	Best Acting Ensemble	Dwight D. Eisenhower	Robin Williams	The Butler	Nominated
2014	Best Acting Ensemble	John F. Kennedy	James Marsden	The Butler	Nominated
2014	Best Acting Ensemble	Lyndon B. Johnson	Liev Schreiber	The Butler	Nominated
2014	Best Acting Ensemble	Richard Nixon	John Cusack	The Butler	Nominated
2014	Best Acting Ensemble	Ronald Reagan	Alan Rickman	The Butler	Nominated
2015	Best Acting Ensemble	Lyndon B. Johnson	Tom Wilkinson	Selma	Nominated
2019	Best Acting Ensemble	George W. Bush	Sam Rockwell	Vice	Nominated

==== Critics' Choice Television Awards ====
Year	Category	President	Nominee	Film or Television Series or Miniseries	Result
2016	Best Actor in a Movie/Miniseries	Lyndon B. Johnson	Bryan Cranston	All the Way	Nominated
2016	Best Actor in a Movie/Miniseries	Ronald Reagan	Tim Matheson	Killing Reagan	Nominated
2016	Best Guest Performer in a Comedy Series	Donald Trump	Alec Baldwin	Saturday Night Live	Won

==== Golden Globe Awards ====
Year	Category	President	Nominee	Film or Television Series or Miniseries	Result
1945	Best Actor – Motion Picture Drama	Woodrow Wilson	Alexander Knox	Wilson	Won
1976	Best Actor – Motion Picture Drama	Harry S. Truman	James Whitmore	Give 'em Hell, Harry!	Nominated
1984	Best Actor – Miniseries or Television Film	John F. Kennedy	Martin Sheen	Kennedy	Nominated
1988	Best Actor – Miniseries or Television Film	Lyndon B. Johnson	Randy Quaid	LBJ: The Early Years	Won
1996	Best Actor – Motion Picture Drama	Richard Nixon	Anthony Hopkins	Nixon	Nominated
1996	Best Actor – Miniseries or Television Film	Harry S. Truman	Gary Sinise	Truman	Won
1998	Best Supporting Actor – Motion Picture	John Quincy Adams	Anthony Hopkins	Amistad	Nominated
2006	Best Actor – Miniseries or Television Film	Franklin D. Roosevelt	Kenneth Branagh	Warm Springs	Nominated
2009	Best Actor – Motion Picture Drama	Richard Nixon	Frank Langella	Frost/Nixon	Nominated
2009	Best Actor – Miniseries or Television Film	John Adams	Paul Giamatti	John Adams	Won
2011	Best Actor – Miniseries or Television Film	Bill Clinton	Dennis Quaid	The Special Relationship	Nominated
2013	Best Actor – Motion Picture Drama	Abraham Lincoln	Daniel Day-Lewis	Lincoln	Won
2013	Best Actor – Motion Picture Musical or Comedy	Franklin D. Roosevelt	Bill Murray	Hyde Park on Hudson	Nominated
2017	Best Actor – Miniseries or Television Film	Lyndon B. Johnson	Bryan Cranston	All the Way	Nominated
2019	Best Supporting Actor – Motion Picture	George W. Bush	Sam Rockwell	Vice	Nominated
2021	Best Supporting Actor – Series, Miniseries or Television Film	Donald Trump	Brendan Gleeson	The Comey Rule	Nominated

==== MTV Movie Awards ====
Year	Category	President	Nominee	Film	Result
2013	Best Performance	Abraham Lincoln	Daniel Day-Lewis	Lincoln	Nominated

==== Primetime Emmy Awards ====
Year	Category	President	Nominee	Film or Television Series or Miniseries	Result
1975	Outstanding Lead Actor in a Special Program – Drama or Comedy	John F. Kennedy	William Devane	The Missiles of October	Nominated
1976	Outstanding Lead Actor in a Special Program – Drama or Comedy	Franklin D. Roosevelt	Edward Herrmann	Eleanor and Franklin	Nominated
1976	Outstanding Lead Actor in a Miniseries or a Movie	Abraham Lincoln	Hal Holbrook	Lincoln	Won
1976	Outstanding Lead Actor in a Miniseries or a Movie	John Adams	George Grizzard	The Adams Chronicles	Nominated
1977	Outstanding Lead Actor in a Special Program – Drama or Comedy	Harry S. Truman	Ed Flanders	Harry S. Truman: Plain Speaking	Won
1977	Outstanding Lead Actor in a Special Program – Drama or Comedy	Franklin D. Roosevelt	Edward Herrmann	Eleanor and Franklin: The White House Years	Nominated
1979	Outstanding Supporting Actor in a Limited Series or a Special	Woodrow Wilson	Robert Vaughn	Backstairs at the White House	Nominated
1979	Outstanding Supporting Actor in a Limited Series or a Special	Calvin Coolidge	Ed Flanders	Backstairs at the White House	Nominated
1980	Outstanding Lead Actor in a Limited Series or a Special	Franklin D. Roosevelt	Jason Robards	F.D.R.: The Last Year	Nominated
1987	Outstanding Lead Actor in a Miniseries or a Special	Lyndon B. Johnson	Randy Quaid	LBJ: The Early Years	Nominated
1996	Outstanding Lead Actor in a Miniseries or a Special	Harry S. Truman	Gary Sinise	Truman	Nominated
1996	Outstanding Lead Actor in a Miniseries or a Special	Richard Nixon	Beau Bridges	Kissinger and Nixon	Nominated
2002	Outstanding Lead Actor in a Miniseries or a Movie	Lyndon B. Johnson	Michael Gambon	Path to War	Nominated
2004	Outstanding Lead Actor in a Miniseries or a Movie	Ronald Reagan	James Brolin	The Reagans	Nominated
2005	Outstanding Lead Actor in a Miniseries or a Movie	Franklin D. Roosevelt	Kenneth Branagh	Warm Springs	Nominated
2008	Outstanding Lead Actor in a Miniseries or a Movie	John Adams	Paul Giamatti	John Adams	Won
2008	Outstanding Supporting Actor in a Miniseries or a Movie	George Washington	David Morse	John Adams	Nominated
2008	Outstanding Supporting Actor in a Miniseries or a Movie	Thomas Jefferson	Stephen Dillane	John Adams	Nominated
2009	Outstanding Supporting Actor in a Miniseries or a Movie	Franklin D. Roosevelt	Len Cariou	Into the Storm	Nominated
2010	Outstanding Lead Actor in a Miniseries or a Movie	Bill Clinton	Dennis Quaid	The Special Relationship	Nominated
2011	Outstanding Lead Actor in a Miniseries or a Movie	John F. Kennedy	Greg Kinnear	The Kennedys	Nominated
2016	Outstanding Lead Actor in a Limited Series or a Movie	Lyndon B. Johnson	Bryan Cranston	All the Way	Nominated
2017	Outstanding Supporting Actor in a Comedy Series	Donald Trump	Alec Baldwin	Saturday Night Live	Won
2018	Outstanding Supporting Actor in a Comedy Series	Donald Trump	Alec Baldwin	Saturday Night Live	Nominated
2021	Outstanding Guest Actor in a Comedy Series	Donald Trump	Alec Baldwin	Saturday Night Live	Nominated
2021	Outstanding Supporting Actor in a Limited or Anthology Series or Movie	Thomas Jefferson	Daveed Diggs	Hamilton	Nominated

==== Satellite Awards ====
Year	Category	President	Nominee	Film or Television Series or Miniseries	Result
1999	Best Supporting Actor – Series, Miniseries or Television Film	Abraham Lincoln	Lance Henriksen	The Day Lincoln Was Shot	Nominated
2000	Best Supporting Actor – Motion Picture Musical or Comedy	Richard Nixon	Dan Hedaya	Dick	Nominated
2001	Best Supporting Actor – Motion Picture Drama	John F. Kennedy	Bruce Greenwood	Thirteen Days	Won
2006	Best Actor – Miniseries or Television Film	Franklin D. Roosevelt	Kenneth Branagh	Warm Springs	Nominated
2008	Best Actor – Motion Picture Drama	Richard Nixon	Frank Langella	Frost/Nixon	Nominated
2008	Best Actor – Motion Picture Musical or Comedy	George W. Bush	Josh Brolin	W.	Nominated
2008	Best Actor – Miniseries or Television Film	John Adams	Paul Giamatti	John Adams	Won
2010	Best Actor – Miniseries or Television Film	Bill Clinton	Dennis Quaid	The Special Relationship	Nominated
2012	Best Actor – Motion Picture Drama	Abraham Lincoln	Daniel Day-Lewis	Lincoln	Nominated
2017	Best Actor – Miniseries or Television Film	Lyndon B. Johnson	Bryan Cranston	All the Way	Won

==== Screen Actors Guild Awards ====
Year	Category	President	Nominee	Film or Television Series or Miniseries	Result
1996	Outstanding Male Actor in a Leading Role	Richard Nixon	Anthony Hopkins	Nixon	Nominated
1996	Outstanding Cast in a Motion Picture	Richard Nixon	Anthony Hopkins	Nixon	Nominated
1996	Outstanding Male Actor in a Miniseries or Television Movie	Harry S. Truman	Gary Sinise	Truman	Won
1998	Outstanding Male Actor in a Supporting Role	John Quincy Adams	Anthony Hopkins	Amistad	Nominated
2006	Outstanding Male Actor in a Miniseries or Television Movie	Franklin D. Roosevelt	Kenneth Branagh	Warm Springs	Nominated
2009	Outstanding Male Actor in a Miniseries or Television Movie	John Adams	Paul Giamatti	John Adams	Won
2009	Outstanding Male Actor in a Leading Role	Richard Nixon	Frank Langella	Frost/Nixon	Nominated
2009	Outstanding Cast in a Motion Picture	Richard Nixon	Frank Langella	Frost/Nixon	Nominated
2011	Outstanding Male Actor in a Miniseries or Television Movie	Bill Clinton	Dennis Quaid	The Special Relationship	Nominated
2012	Outstanding Male Actor in a Miniseries or Television Movie	John F. Kennedy	Greg Kinnear	The Kennedys	Nominated
2013	Outstanding Male Actor in a Leading Role	Abraham Lincoln	Daniel Day-Lewis	Lincoln	Won
2013	Outstanding Cast in a Motion Picture	Abraham Lincoln	Daniel Day-Lewis	Lincoln	Nominated
2014	Outstanding Cast in a Motion Picture	Dwight D. Eisenhower	Robin Williams	The Butler	Nominated
2014	Outstanding Cast in a Motion Picture	John F. Kennedy	James Marsden	The Butler	Nominated
2014	Outstanding Cast in a Motion Picture	Lyndon B. Johnson	Liev Schreiber	The Butler	Nominated
2014	Outstanding Cast in a Motion Picture	Richard Nixon	John Cusack	The Butler	Nominated
2014	Outstanding Cast in a Motion Picture	Ronald Reagan	Alan Rickman	The Butler	Nominated
2014	Outstanding Male Actor in a Miniseries or Television Movie	John F. Kennedy	Rob Lowe	Killing Kennedy	Nominated
2017	Outstanding Male Actor in a Miniseries or Television Movie	Lyndon B. Johnson	Bryan Cranston	All the Way	Won
2020	Outstanding Male Actor in a Miniseries or Television Movie	Thomas Jefferson	Daveed Diggs	Hamilton	Nominated

==== TCA Awards ====
Year	Category	President	Nominee	Television Series or Miniseries	Result
2008	Individual Achievement in Drama	John Adams	Paul Giamatti	John Adams	Won
2016	Individual Achievement in Drama	Lyndon B. Johnson	Bryan Cranston	All the Way	Nominated

==== Tony Awards ====
Year	Category	President	Nominee	Show	Result
1958	Distinguished Dramatic Actor	Franklin D. Roosevelt	Ralph Bellamy	Sunrise at Campobello	Won
1969	Best Featured Actor in a Musical	John Adams	William Daniels	1776	Nominated
1994	Best Actor in a Play	Abraham Lincoln	Sam Waterston	Abe Lincoln in Illinois	Nominated
2007	Best Actor in a Play	Richard Nixon	Frank Langella	Frost/Nixon	Won
2014	Best Actor in a Play	Lyndon B. Johnson	Bryan Cranston	All the Way	Won
2016	Best Featured Actor in a Musical	Thomas Jefferson	Daveed Diggs	Hamilton	Won
2016	Best Featured Actor in a Musical	George Washington	Christopher Jackson	Hamilton	Nominated

=== Fictional presidents ===
==== Academy Awards ====
Year	Category	President	Nominee	Film	Result
1964	Best Actor	Merkin Muffley	Peter Sellers	Dr. Strangelove or: How I Learned to Stop Worrying and Love the Bomb	Nominated
1964	Best Supporting Actor	Art Hockstader	Lee Tracy	The Best Man	Nominated
2001	Best Supporting Actor	Jackson Evans	Jeff Bridges	The Contender	Nominated

==== Critics' Choice Television Awards ====
Year	Category	President	Nominee	Film or Television Series or Miniseries	Result
2012	Best Actress in a Comedy Series	Selina Meyer	Julia Louis-Dreyfus	Veep	Nominated
2013	Best Actor in a Drama Series	Frank Underwood	Kevin Spacey	House of Cards	Nominated
2013	Best Actress in a Comedy Series	Selina Meyer	Julia Louis-Dreyfus	Veep	Won
2014	Best Actress in a Comedy Series	Selina Meyer	Julia Louis-Dreyfus	Veep	Won
2014	Best Actress in a Drama Series	Claire Underwood	Robin Wright	House of Cards	Nominated
2014	Best Supporting Actress in a Drama Series	Mellie Grant	Bellamy Young	Scandal	Won
2015	Best Actress in a Comedy Series	Selina Meyer	Julia Louis-Dreyfus	Veep	Nominated
2016	Best Actress in a Comedy Series	Selina Meyer	Julia Louis-Dreyfus	Veep	Nominated
2016	Best Actor in a Drama Series	Frank Underwood	Kevin Spacey	House of Cards	Nominated
2016	Best Actress in a Drama Series	Claire Underwood	Robin Wright	House of Cards	Nominated
2018	Best Actress in a Drama Series	Claire Underwood	Robin Wright	House of Cards	Nominated
2020	Best Actress in a Comedy Series	Selina Meyer	Julia Louis-Dreyfus	Veep	Nominated

==== Golden Globe Awards ====
Year	Category	President	Nominee	Film or Television Series or Miniseries	Result
1965	Best Actor – Motion Picture Drama	Jordan Lyman	Fredric March	Seven Days in May	Nominated
1994	Best Actor – Motion Picture Musical or Comedy	Bill Mitchell	Kevin Kline	Dave	Nominated
1996	Best Actor – Motion Picture Musical or Comedy	Andrew Shepherd	Michael Douglas	The American President	Nominated
1999	Best Actor – Motion Picture Musical or Comedy	Jack Stanton	John Travolta	Primary Colors	Nominated
2000	Best Actor – Television Series Drama	Josiah Bartlet	Martin Sheen	The West Wing	Nominated
2001	Best Supporting Actor – Motion Picture	Jackson Evans	Jeff Bridges	The Contender	Nominated
2001	Best Actor – Television Series Drama	Josiah Bartlet	Martin Sheen	The West Wing	Won
2002	Best Actor – Television Series Drama	Josiah Bartlet	Martin Sheen	The West Wing	Nominated
2003	Best Actor – Television Series Drama	Josiah Bartlet	Martin Sheen	The West Wing	Nominated
2003	Best Supporting Actor – Series, Miniseries or Television Film	David Palmer	Dennis Haysbert	24	Nominated
2004	Best Actor – Television Series Drama	Josiah Bartlet	Martin Sheen	The West Wing	Nominated
2007	Best Actress – Television Series Drama	MacKenzie Allen	Geena Davis	Commander in Chief	Won
2013	Best Actress – Television Series Musical or Comedy	Selina Meyer	Julia Louis-Dreyfus	Veep	Nominated
2014	Best Actress – Television Series Musical or Comedy	Selina Meyer	Julia Louis-Dreyfus	Veep	Nominated
2014	Best Actor – Television Series Drama	Frank Underwood	Kevin Spacey	House of Cards	Nominated
2014	Best Actress – Television Series Drama	Claire Underwood	Robin Wright	House of Cards	Won
2015	Best Actress – Television Series Drama	Claire Underwood	Robin Wright	House of Cards	Nominated
2015	Best Actor – Television Series Drama	Frank Underwood	Kevin Spacey	House of Cards	Won
2015	Best Actress – Television Series Musical or Comedy	Selina Meyer	Julia Louis-Dreyfus	Veep	Nominated
2016	Best Actress – Television Series Musical or Comedy	Selina Meyer	Julia Louis-Dreyfus	Veep	Nominated
2016	Best Actress – Television Series Drama	Claire Underwood	Robin Wright	House of Cards	Nominated
2017	Best Actor – Television Series Musical or Comedy	Richard Graves	Nick Nolte	Graves	Nominated
2017	Best Actress – Television Series Musical or Comedy	Selina Meyer	Julia Louis-Dreyfus	Veep	Nominated

==== MTV Movie Awards ====
Year	Category	President	Nominee	Film	Result
1998	Best Fight	James Marshall	Harrison Ford	Air Force One	Nominated

==== People's Choice Awards ====
Year	Category	President	Nominee	Film or Television Series or Miniseries	Result
2017	Favorite Actor In A New TV Series	Tom Kirkman	Kiefer Sutherland	Designated Survivor	Nominated
2018	The Male TV Star of 2018	Fitzgerald Grant III	Tony Goldwyn	Scandal	Nominated

==== Primetime Emmy Awards ====
Year	Category	President	Nominee	Film or Television Series or Miniseries	Result
1971	Outstanding Single Performance by an Actor in a Leading Role	Paul Roudebush	Richard Widmark	Vanished	Nominated
2000	Outstanding Lead Actor in a Drama Series	Josiah Bartlet	Martin Sheen	The West Wing	Nominated
2001	Outstanding Lead Actor in a Drama Series	Josiah Bartlet	Martin Sheen	The West Wing	Nominated
2002	Outstanding Lead Actor in a Drama Series	Josiah Bartlet	Martin Sheen	The West Wing	Nominated
2003	Outstanding Lead Actor in a Drama Series	Josiah Bartlet	Martin Sheen	The West Wing	Nominated
2004	Outstanding Lead Actor in a Drama Series	Josiah Bartlet	Martin Sheen	The West Wing	Nominated
2006	Outstanding Lead Actor in a Drama Series	Josiah Bartlet	Martin Sheen	The West Wing	Nominated
2006	Outstanding Lead Actress in a Drama Series	MacKenzie Allen	Geena Davis	Commander in Chief	Nominated
2006	Outstanding Supporting Actor in a Drama Series	Charles Logan	Gregory Itzin	24	Nominated
2009	Outstanding Supporting Actress in a Drama Series	Allison Taylor	Cherry Jones	24	Won
2010	Outstanding Guest Actor in a Drama Series	Charles Logan	Gregory Itzin	24	Nominated
2012	Outstanding Lead Actress in a Comedy Series	Selina Meyer	Julia Louis-Dreyfus	Veep	Won
2013	Outstanding Lead Actress in a Comedy Series	Selina Meyer	Julia Louis-Dreyfus	Veep	Won
2013	Outstanding Lead Actor in a Drama Series	Frank Underwood	Kevin Spacey	House of Cards	Nominated
2013	Outstanding Lead Actress in a Drama Series	Claire Underwood	Robin Wright	House of Cards	Nominated
2014	Outstanding Lead Actress in a Drama Series	Claire Underwood	Robin Wright	House of Cards	Nominated
2014	Outstanding Lead Actor in a Drama Series	Frank Underwood	Kevin Spacey	House of Cards	Nominated
2014	Outstanding Lead Actress in a Comedy Series	Selina Meyer	Julia Louis-Dreyfus	Veep	Won
2015	Outstanding Lead Actress in a Comedy Series	Selina Meyer	Julia Louis-Dreyfus	Veep	Won
2015	Outstanding Lead Actor in a Drama Series	Frank Underwood	Kevin Spacey	House of Cards	Nominated
2015	Outstanding Lead Actress in a Drama Series	Claire Underwood	Robin Wright	House of Cards	Nominated
2016	Outstanding Lead Actress in a Drama Series	Claire Underwood	Robin Wright	House of Cards	Nominated
2016	Outstanding Lead Actor in a Drama Series	Frank Underwood	Kevin Spacey	House of Cards	Nominated
2016	Outstanding Lead Actress in a Comedy Series	Selina Meyer	Julia Louis-Dreyfus	Veep	Won
2017	Outstanding Lead Actress in a Comedy Series	Selina Meyer	Julia Louis-Dreyfus	Veep	Won
2017	Outstanding Lead Actor in a Drama Series	Frank Underwood	Kevin Spacey	House of Cards	Nominated
2017	Outstanding Lead Actress in a Drama Series	Claire Underwood	Robin Wright	House of Cards	Nominated
2019	Outstanding Lead Actress in a Drama Series	Claire Underwood	Robin Wright	House of Cards	Nominated
2019	Outstanding Lead Actress in a Comedy Series	Selina Meyer	Julia Louis-Dreyfus	Veep	Nominated

==== Satellite Awards ====
Year	Category	President	Nominee	Film or Television Series or Miniseries	Result
1997	Best Actor – Motion Picture Musical or Comedy	James Dale	Jack Nicholson	Mars Attacks!	Nominated
2000	Best Actor – Television Series Drama	Josiah Bartlet	Martin Sheen	The West Wing	Won
2001	Best Supporting Actor – Motion Picture Drama	Jackson Evans	Jeff Bridges	The Contender	Nominated
2001	Best Actor – Television Series Drama	Josiah Bartlet	Martin Sheen	The West Wing	Nominated
2002	Best Actor – Television Series Drama	Josiah Bartlet	Martin Sheen	The West Wing	Nominated
2003	Best Actor – Television Series Drama	Josiah Bartlet	Martin Sheen	The West Wing	Nominated
2005	Best Actress – Television Series Drama	MacKenzie Allen	Geena Davis	Commander in Chief	Nominated
2013	Best Actress – Television Series Musical or Comedy	Selina Meyer	Julia Louis-Dreyfus	Veep	Nominated
2014	Best Actress – Television Series Musical or Comedy	Selina Meyer	Julia Louis-Dreyfus	Veep	Nominated
2014	Best Actor – Television Series Drama	Frank Underwood	Kevin Spacey	House of Cards	Nominated
2014	Best Actress – Television Series Drama	Claire Underwood	Robin Wright	House of Cards	Won
2015	Best Actress – Television Series Drama	Claire Underwood	Robin Wright	House of Cards	Nominated
2015	Best Actress – Television Series Musical or Comedy	Selina Meyer	Julia Louis-Dreyfus	Veep	Nominated
2016	Best Actress – Television Series Drama	Claire Underwood	Robin Wright	House of Cards	Nominated
2016	Best Actress – Television Series Musical or Comedy	Selina Meyer	Julia Louis-Dreyfus	Veep	Nominated
2018	Best Actress – Television Series Musical or Comedy	Selina Meyer	Julia Louis-Dreyfus	Veep	Nominated

==== Screen Actors Guild Awards ====
Year	Category	President	Nominee	Film or Television Series or Miniseries	Result
2000	Outstanding Male Actor in a Drama Series	Josiah Bartlet	Martin Sheen	The West Wing	Nominated
2001	Outstanding Male Actor in a Supporting Role	Jackson Evans	Jeff Bridges	The Contender	Nominated
2001	Outstanding Male Actor in a Drama Series	Josiah Bartlet	Martin Sheen	The West Wing	Won
2001	Outstanding Ensemble in a Drama Series	Josiah Bartlet	Martin Sheen	The West Wing	Won
2002	Outstanding Male Actor in a Drama Series	Josiah Bartlet	Martin Sheen	The West Wing	Won
2002	Outstanding Ensemble in a Drama Series	Josiah Bartlet	Martin Sheen	The West Wing	Won
2003	Outstanding Male Actor in a Drama Series	Josiah Bartlet	Martin Sheen	The West Wing	Nominated
2003	Outstanding Ensemble in a Drama Series	Josiah Bartlet	Martin Sheen	The West Wing	Nominated
2003	Outstanding Ensemble in a Drama Series	David Palmer	Dennis Haysbert	24	Nominated
2004	Outstanding Male Actor in a Drama Series	Josiah Bartlet	Martin Sheen	The West Wing	Nominated
2004	Outstanding Ensemble in a Drama Series	Josiah Bartlet	Martin Sheen	The West Wing	Nominated
2005	Outstanding Ensemble in a Drama Series	Josiah Bartlet	Martin Sheen	The West Wing	Nominated
2006	Outstanding Female Actor in a Drama Series	MacKenzie Allen	Geena Davis	Commander in Chief	Nominated
2006	Outstanding Ensemble in a Drama Series	Josiah Bartlet	Martin Sheen	The West Wing	Nominated
2006	Outstanding Ensemble in a Drama Series	Matt Santos	Jimmy Smits	The West Wing	Nominated
2007	Outstanding Ensemble in a Drama Series	Charles Logan	Gregory Itzin	24	Nominated
2014	Outstanding Male Actor in a Drama Series	Frank Underwood	Kevin Spacey	House of Cards	Nominated
2014	Outstanding Female Actor in a Comedy Series	Selina Meyer	Julia Louis-Dreyfus	Veep	Won
2014	Outstanding Ensemble in a Comedy Series	Selina Meyer	Julia Louis-Dreyfus	Veep	Nominated
2015	Outstanding Male Actor in a Drama Series	Frank Underwood	Kevin Spacey	House of Cards	Won
2015	Outstanding Female Actor in a Drama Series	Claire Underwood	Robin Wright	House of Cards	Nominated
2015	Outstanding Female Actor in a Comedy Series	Selina Meyer	Julia Louis-Dreyfus	Veep	Nominated
2015	Outstanding Ensemble in a Drama Series	Garrett Walker	Michel Gill	House of Cards	Nominated
2015	Outstanding Ensemble in a Drama Series	Frank Underwood	Kevin Spacey	House of Cards	Nominated
2015	Outstanding Ensemble in a Drama Series	Claire Underwood	Robin Wright	House of Cards	Nominated
2015	Outstanding Ensemble in a Comedy Series	Selina Meyer	Julia Louis-Dreyfus	Veep	Nominated
2016	Outstanding Male Actor in a Drama Series	Frank Underwood	Kevin Spacey	House of Cards	Won
2016	Outstanding Female Actor in a Drama Series	Claire Underwood	Robin Wright	House of Cards	Nominated
2016	Outstanding Female Actor in a Comedy Series	Selina Meyer	Julia Louis-Dreyfus	Veep	Nominated
2016	Outstanding Ensemble in a Drama Series	Frank Underwood	Kevin Spacey	House of Cards	Nominated
2016	Outstanding Ensemble in a Drama Series	Claire Underwood	Robin Wright	House of Cards	Nominated
2016	Outstanding Ensemble in a Comedy Series	Selina Meyer	Julia Louis-Dreyfus	Veep	Nominated
2017	Outstanding Male Actor in a Drama Series	Frank Underwood	Kevin Spacey	House of Cards	Nominated
2017	Outstanding Female Actor in a Drama Series	Claire Underwood	Robin Wright	House of Cards	Nominated
2017	Outstanding Female Actor in a Comedy Series	Selina Meyer	Julia Louis-Dreyfus	Veep	Won
2017	Outstanding Ensemble in a Comedy Series	Selina Meyer	Julia Louis-Dreyfus	Veep	Nominated
2018	Outstanding Female Actor in a Drama Series	Claire Underwood	Robin Wright	House of Cards	Nominated
2018	Outstanding Female Actor in a Comedy Series	Selina Meyer	Julia Louis-Dreyfus	Veep	Won
2018	Outstanding Ensemble in a Comedy Series	Selina Meyer	Julia Louis-Dreyfus	Veep	Won
2019	Outstanding Female Actor in a Drama Series	Claire Underwood	Robin Wright	House of Cards	Nominated

==== TCA Awards ====
Year	Category	President	Nominee	Television Series or Miniseries	Result
2000	Individual Achievement in Drama	Josiah Bartlet	Martin Sheen	The West Wing	Nominated
2001	Individual Achievement in Drama	Josiah Bartlet	Martin Sheen	The West Wing	Nominated
2002	Individual Achievement in Drama	Josiah Bartlet	Martin Sheen	The West Wing	Nominated
2012	Individual Achievement in Comedy	Selina Meyer	Julia Louis-Dreyfus	Veep	Nominated
2013	Individual Achievement in Comedy	Selina Meyer	Julia Louis-Dreyfus	Veep	Nominated
2014	Individual Achievement in Comedy	Selina Meyer	Julia Louis-Dreyfus	Veep	Won
2015	Individual Achievement in Comedy	Selina Meyer	Julia Louis-Dreyfus	Veep	Nominated
2016	Individual Achievement in Comedy	Selina Meyer	Julia Louis-Dreyfus	Veep	Nominated
2017	Individual Achievement in Comedy	Selina Meyer	Julia Louis-Dreyfus	Veep	Nominated
2019	Individual Achievement in Comedy	Selina Meyer	Julia Louis-Dreyfus	Veep	Nominated
