= Rhett & Link's Wonderhole =

Internet comedy series by Rhett & Link

- Genre: Comedy
- Created by: Rhett McLaughlin; Link Neal
- Country of origin: United States
- Original language: English
- No. of seasons: 2

Production
- Executive producers: Rhett McLaughlin; Link Neal; Stevie Wynne Levine
- Production company: Mythical Entertainment

Original release
- Network: YouTube
- Release: July 26, 2024 – present

Rhett and Link's Wonderhole is an American YouTube comedy web series created by and starring Rhett McLaughlin and Link Neal.

Produced by Mythical Entertainment, the series marks a departure from the duo’s long-running daily talk show Good Mythical Morning, focusing instead on cinematic, narrative-driven comedy episodes blending absurdist sketches, musical numbers, and high-concept storytelling.

The series premiered on July 26, 2024, on YouTube and was renewed for a second season following strong viewership and audience reception.

== Premise ==
Each episode of Wonderhole centers on a high-concept comedic premise, often involving surreal or speculative scenarios. Unlike the conversational format of Good Mythical Morning, the series employs scripted narratives, recurring characters, and elaborate production design. Episodes blend sketch comedy, character-driven scenes, and musical performances, often exploring themes of nostalgia, internet culture, and friendship through absurdist humor.

== Production ==
Development on Wonderhole began as part of Mythical Entertainment’s effort to expand beyond daily talk show programming into scripted projects. In interviews, McLaughlin and Neal described the series as a return to their filmmaking roots, drawing inspiration from their early YouTube sketches and narrative experiments.

The second season was announced in July 2025, with a trailer highlighting expanded storytelling scope and introduced more celebrity cameos.

== Background ==
McLaughlin and Neal, longtime collaborators and founders of Mythical Entertainment, rose to prominence through viral YouTube sketches before launching Good Mythical Morning in 2012. In 2025, they were named to Time’s TIME100 list, recognizing their influence in digital media.

Industry coverage has framed Wonderhole as part of a broader shift in creator-led storytelling, blending brand partnerships and narrative content in new formats.

== Reception ==
Upon its debut, Wonderhole was described by Tubefilter as Rhett and Link’s “most ambitious project yet,” citing its higher production values and narrative scope compared to their daily programming.

== Cast ==
=== Main ===
- Rhett McLaughlin as Himself
- Link Neal as Himself

=== Guest characters ===
- Danny Trejo as Pops
- Rainn Wilson as Himself
- Rob Huebel as Big Tom
- Kate Flannery as Molly
- Rhys Darby as Narrator
- Randall Park, Daniel Thrasher, Angela Giarratana, and others as Squirrel Family
- Felicia Day as Draven the Technonaut (voice)
- Howie Mandel as Himself
- Katey Sagal as Voice role

== Episodes ==
=== Season 1 (2024) ===
No. overall	No. in season	Title	Original release date
1	1	"We Took The World's Most Expensive First Class Flight"	August 23, 2024
Rhett & Link build a simulated luxurious first class airplane suite in their studio to try their hands at travel vlogging, until things go unexpectedly and hilariously awry.
2	2	"We Time Traveled to the Year 2224"	August 30, 2024
Rhett and Link embark on a scavenger hunt they set up 200 years prior, traversing the cyberpunk future of Burbank while exploring friendship's depth through laughter and adventure across its futuristic landscape.
3	3	"We Drank A Cloud"	September 6, 2024
Rhett and Link attempt to drink a cloud, pushing a strange experiment into unexpected consequences.
4	4	"We Made An Axe Out of Peanut Butter and Cut Down a Tree"	September 13, 2024
Rhett and Link decide to cut down a tree, a tree inhabited by a family of squirrels whose lives are about to change forever.
5	5	"We Spent 24 Hours Locked In Red and Blue Rooms"	September 20, 2024
Rhett immerses himself in a completely red room, while Link is confined to a blue room.
6	6	"We Made Giant 400 Pound Gummies of Ourselves"	September 27, 2024
Rhett and Link create life-sized gelatin imitations of themselves, then wrestle with what to do next as the experiment turns reflective.

=== Season 2 (2025) ===
No. overall	No. in season	Title	Original release date
7	1	"Stranded 100 Hours on a Homemade Raft"	August 24, 2025
Rhett and Link challenge themselves with staying on a raft in the middle of a pond, where they make enemies with a bizarre pizza delivery man.
8	2	"We Tested 1-Star Hotels"	August 31, 2025
Rhett and Link set out to stay in the worst reviewed hotel rooms they can find, only to stumble upon a quasi-religious movement revolving around the hotel's manager, Morgan.
9	3	"Last to Fall Asleep Wins $10,000"	September 7, 2025
Rhett and Link compete in a last-to-fall-asleep challenge with $10,000 on the line.
10	4	"We Bought an Abandoned Storage Unit and Struck Gold"	September 14, 2025
The duo buy an abandoned storage unit and chase rumors of hidden treasure, with escalating consequences.
11	5	"Extreme Camouflage Hide and Seek"	September 21, 2025
Rhett and Link play an extreme version of hide-and-seek using elaborate camouflage tactics.
12	6	"$1K vs. $100,000,000 House"	September 28, 2025
Rhett and Link compare an ultra-cheap home against an extravagantly expensive one, testing what “worth it” really means.

== Accolades ==
Year	Award	Category	Nominee	Result	Ref.
2025	The Webby Awards	Video & Film: Series & Channels — Comedy (People’s Voice Winner)	Rhett & Link’s Wonderhole	Won	
