= Scumbag Steve =

Internet meme and fictional character

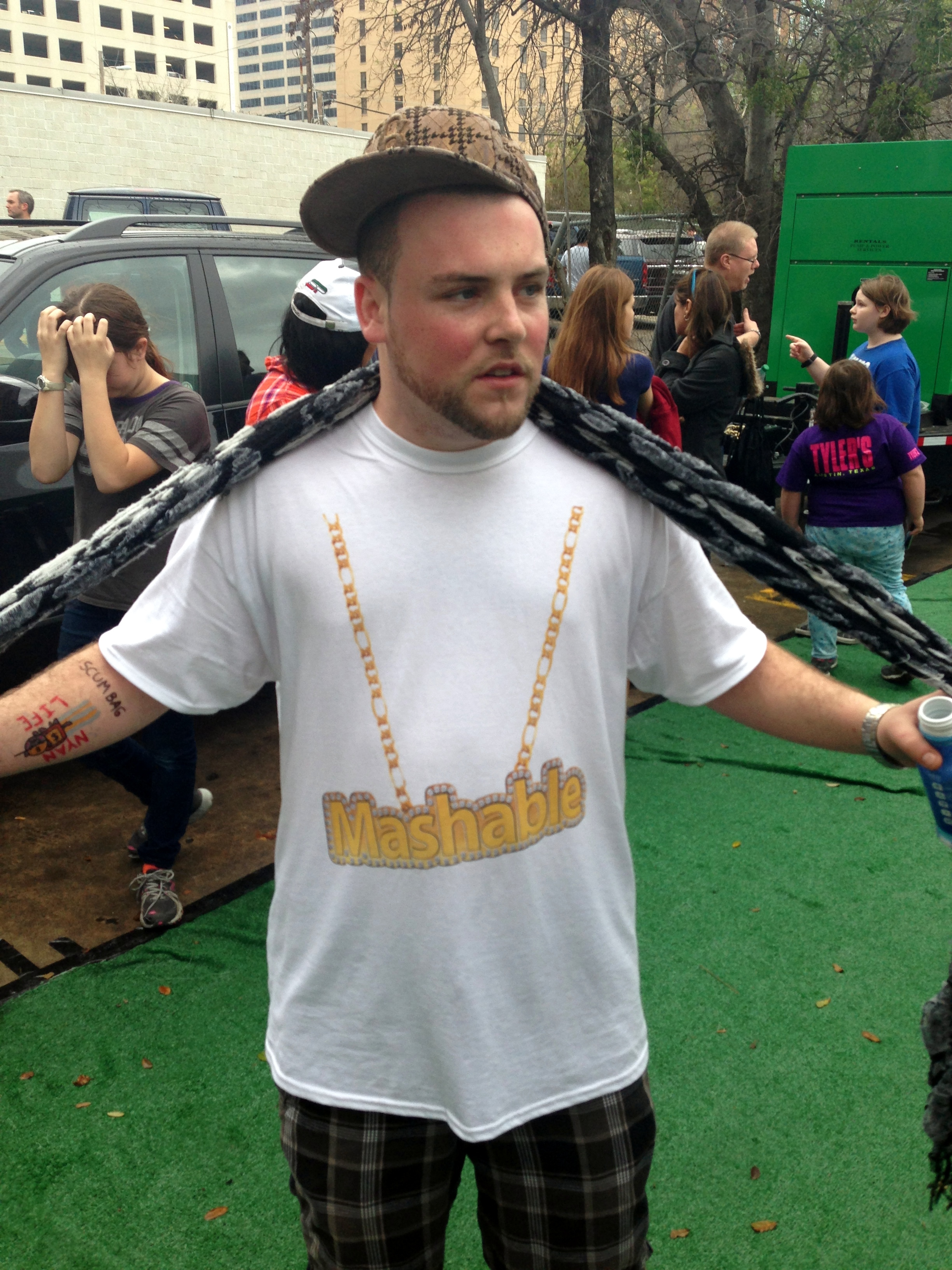
Blake Boston as Scumbag Steve in 2013

Scumbag Steve is a fictional character seen in an Internet meme that became popular in January 2011. The meme depicts him standing in a doorway with a dazed stare wearing a gold chain, backwards flat-brim Red Sox hat, and puffy winter coat with a fake fur collar. The photo originated in 2006, when 16-year-old Blake Boston posed for a photo taken by his mother, Susan Boston, at their home in Millis, Massachusetts. The meme generally superimposes text on top of the image of Boston consisting of an introductory sentence at the top and a punchline at the bottom. In 2012, Boston released a rap single on iTunes, under the alias "Blake Boston AKA Scumbag Steve" in an attempt to launch a career in music.

== Origin ==
Blake Boston, who says that is his real name, was raised in the Greater Boston area. He was a rambunctious child.

After his mother took the picture in 2006, Blake Boston was pleased with it and allowed his mother to post it to his Myspace page, recalling in 2011 that "I sure as shit thought I was a balla". To his surprise, the image gained widespread popularity in January 2011 after being posted on Reddit and 4chan. Boston became aware of Scumbag Steve late at night after he noticed unusual activity on his Facebook profile. Boston was confused by the images and later described his thoughts: "Who the fuck knew what a meme was? I had never even heard the word." He woke up his mother to show her that he was being depicted as a scumbag, and she started crying when she saw the search results for "Scumbag Steve". Because Boston was adopted when he was very young, she worried that his birth mother might see the meme and believe the son she gave up had been raised to be a scumbag.

During the first few weeks of the Scumbag Steve memes, Blake Boston responded to them with profane rants, and unsuccessfully demanded that websites take the images of him down. His reaction brought additional attention to the meme and some of his angry quotes were used as captions for the photo. Internet users edited Scumbag Steve's hat onto images of public figures such as Hosni Mubarak, Egypt's president who shut down the nation's internet. Eventually Boston embraced his new fame.

In 2012, Boston told The Boston Globe that his similarities with Scumbag Steve were "probably why it hurt" to see the meme. Just like the fictional Scumbag Steve character, Boston at the time borrowed lighters but did not return them, smoked menthols, drank Mountain Dew, lived with his parents, was unemployed, and aspired to be a rapper.

The hat was light brown and A-Tooth-style with a Red Sox logo by New Era. It was estimated that there were less than 1000 of that exact hat made. Boston said his mother believed she had bought it for a discount at Marshalls, likely due to low demand. Boston said he had turned down offers of tens of thousands of dollars for the original hat.

In 2012, Boston attended SXSW as well as ROFLcon, where he performed his "Scumbag Steve Overture" rap song with Chuck Testa and Antoine Dodson (known for the Bed Intruder meme).

In 2016, Boston told BuzzFeed News "Being considered the quintessential internet scumbag, known worldwide – bragging in Trump fashion – I can, without any hesitation, say that Trump is [...] one of the biggest scumbags around."
