= Rhett & Link's Buddy System =

- Also known as: Buddy System
- Genre: Comedy; Adventure; Surreal comedy
- Created by: Rhett McLaughlin; Link Neal
- Directed by: John Fortenberry (Season 1); Steve Pink (Season 2)
- Starring: Rhett McLaughlin; Link Neal; Page Kennedy; Leslie Bibb
- Theme music composer: Flint Eastwood
- Opening theme: "Secretary"
- Composers: Ben Bram; David Das; Graham Fink; Rhett McLaughlin; Link Neal
- Country of origin: United States
- Original language: English
- No. of seasons: 2
- No. of episodes: 16

Production
- Executive producers: John Cohen; Sivert Glarum (Season 2); Spencer Griffin; Michael Jamin (Season 2); Stevie Wynne Levine; Rhett McLaughlin; Link Neal; Sam Reich; Dan Weinstein
- Cinematography: Benjamin Eck
- Editors: Taylor Gianotas; Mike Small; Jason Greene
- Running time: 15-22 minutes
- Production companies: Big Breakfast (Season 1); Kids At Play (Season 2); Mythical Entertainment

Original release
- Network: YouTube Red
- Release: October 19, 2016 – November 29, 2017

Rhett & Link's Buddy System (also known as Buddy System) is an American web series produced exclusively for YouTube Premium, created by, written by and starring comedy duo Rhett McLaughlin and Link Neal. The series premiered with episodes one and two being released on October 19, 2016, on Rhett and Link's Good Mythical Morning channel. The season 1 finale was released on November 30, 2016. On November 29, 2017, all episodes of Season 2 were released on the same day. In November 2019, every episode was made free to watch on the Good Mythical Morning YouTube channel.

Season 1 of Buddy System features guest stars Page Kennedy and Leslie Bibb, starring as high school friends of Rhett and Link. After Link's phone is stolen by Infomercial Queen Aimee Brells (Bibb), they undertake a wild range of events battling to return it, while she is also attempting to take over the Good Mythical Morning channel as her own.

Season 2 of Buddy System shows a fictitious version of Rhett and Link in an alternate universe, where Rhett McLaughlin is a professional food tester, and Link Neal is lonely and just fired. They meet for the first time when Rhett is looking for an illegal roommate. They learn how to get on with each other, through the ups and downs, and come out together on the other side.

== Premise ==
Season 1 begins with Rhett and Link's quest to regain control of their famous morning talk-show Good Mythical Morning and the channel it is uploaded to from Aimee Brells (Leslie Bibb), an infomercial star, who is using the channel to upload infomercials for a variety of very strange products, and gained access to the channel by stealing Link's phone. Season 2 revolves around the concept of Rhett and Link's friendship, had it never existed.

== Cast ==
=== Main ===
- Rhett McLaughlin as Himself
- Link Neal as Himself
- Page Kennedy as Maxwell
- Leslie Bibb as Aimee Brells

=== Recurring ===
- Mario Revolori as Mandip
- Lauren Powers as Bodyguard
- Adam Gregor as George
- Tobias Jelinek as Dylan
- Jenna Bryant as Magician's Assistant
- Molly Shannon as Rhonda
- Chris Parnell as Vampire Magician
- Tyler Kaplan as Link, age 10
- Talia Dillingham as Roberto
- Tony Hale as Glen
- Garrett Morris as Ignatius
- Alison Rich as Vanessa

== Episodes ==
Season	Episodes	Originally released	
Season	Episodes	First released	Last released
1	8	October 19, 2016	November 30, 2016
2	8	November 29, 2017	

=== Season 1 (2016) ===
No. overall	No. in season	Title	Original release date
1	1	"Tucked Up"	October 19, 2016
Rhett and Link try to make themselves feel more confident by tucking their shirts into their underpants, and to test their new-found bravery, they venture down a dark alleyway, where Link loses his phone and cannot find it. Song: So Dang Dark
2	2	"Super Special Secret Bike"	October 19, 2016
On a search for Link's phone, they head back to the Good Mythical Morning studio to look for Link's phone. After calling it a few times Rhett makes Link retrace his steps. While retracing them, Link tells Rhett that he found a secret room behind Rhett locker earlier that day, and they go inside where Link finds a secret exercise bike that Rhett got before they met. Song: My Exercise Bike
3	3	"You Ding, I Ding"	October 26, 2016
After Link remembers where he left his phone, they head back to a restaurant where they had eaten. After Rhett dings his car, a guy named George and Rhett have a ding-off. After both cars are destroyed, they find out that George is the owner of the restaurant and they go inside to find Link's phone. They find out that their crazy co-ex-girlfriend has Link's phone and is posting infomercials on their channel. Then Rhett & Link have flashback to their prom, where Aimee is dancing with Link. Song: BFF
4	4	"Rolling On Turds"	November 2, 2016
After deciding to wait for Aimee to pull her hand out of the potatoes, they decided to go roller skating, except for that Link wore his rollerblades. They end up getting roped in to rival skating gangs and singing a song, bringing the roller-skaters and rollerbladers together. At the end of the episode Aimee calls, telling them to meet her at midnight. Song: Roller Unity
5	5	"The Magic Is Real"	November 9, 2016
Rhett & Link go to see their friend, Maxwell, do his magic act. After it is over they take a power nap and magically power rap about the power nap. They wakeup to Rhett's phone ringing (it's Aimee) and realize they slept through the meeting. Maxwell tells them it recommended that you set an alarm before taking a power nap, but he had forgot about that part. Aimee tells them that they were going to make a video saying that they were giving their channel over to her. They decided to go on a soul search. Song: Power Nap
6	6	"Soul Searchin'"	November 16, 2016
Rhett meets Peder. Link meets Rhett. Things get weird. On a soul search, they split up to make a decision on their own, Rhett meets Peder who makes him look into his prophes-eye, but really just wants to slowdance with him. Link drinks water from a muddy spring that makes him hallucinate clones of them. He rides Rhett exercise bike, who can talk in his hallucination, and meets fake Rhett. They end up breaking the hallucination barrier so they can make the video to give GMM over to Aimee. Song: Tough Decisions (A Whale is Gonna Die)
7	7	"Another We"	November 23, 2016
Rhett & Link confront their clones, kill them and then disguise themselves to get into one of Aimee's commercials. After Link or 'Sink Mirror' gives everything away, Aimee captures them. Song: If I Had Another Me
8	8	"Kill The Naughty Boy"	November 30, 2016
Aimee captures Rhett and Link and makes them live in her eternal prom. Link tries to kill Rhett. Song: BFF (with rap)

=== Season 2 (2017) ===
No. overall	No. in season	Title	Original release date
9	1	"To Kill a Robot"	November 29, 2017
What if Rhett and Link had never met? Set in an alternate reality, epicurean food-taster Rhett is forced to take on a roommate: a hapless stranger named Link. Written by: Sivert Glarum & Michael Jamin Song: I Like What I Like
10	2	"Sanctuary"	November 29, 2017
It turns out that Rhett never told Link about their other roommate, Glenn. It also turns out Glenn might be a serial killer. Suddenly, living in a morgue drawer does not seem so bad. Written By: Jon Millstein Song: Pour Some Coffee on Me
11	3	"Taste Test"	November 29, 2017
Rhett's job as a professional food taster is put in jeopardy when Link burns Rhett's tongue. Note: includes training montage. Written by: Eli Tery Song: Tongue of the Cobra
12	4	"Spa Trip"	November 29, 2017
Rhett does not like the way Link eats toast; Link does not like to get naked. They go to a really weird day spa. Written By: Aaron Serna Song: Naked
13	5	"Virtual Rhettality"	November 29, 2017
The bunk bed buddies expand their horizons in different ways: Link goes on his first real date. And a virtual reality game allows Rhett to become his most perfect self: a middle-aged woman named Beth. Song: Family Man
14	6	"A Frontier Story"	November 29, 2017
A young girl gives the guys an epic history lesson about 19th century explorers Rhark & Linkis, and their quest to colonize the inside of the Earth. Song: Down with America
15	7	"Silent Fight"	November 29, 2017
When Rhett and Link give each other the silent treatment, they form a non-verbal way to communicate. Dylan sees a way to make millions. Written By Aaron Serna Song: Kings of Bellevue Estates
16	8	"Missing Link"	November 29, 2017
With their relationship damaged beyond repair, Rhett and Link seek to fulfill their ultimate destinies. Written by: Sivert Glarum & Michael Jamin Song: I Like What I Like (Reprise)

== Production ==
The duo officially announced the show on June 23, 2016. Upon release, the show was a success, with the free-to-view premiere episode currently having 14.3 million views. Variety reported in March 2017 that the show was the "number 1 digital series in the US."

So far, two seasons, each with eight episodes, have been released. On May 8, 2017, Rhett and Link announced on the Good Mythical Morning episode "2 Month Old Burrito (EXPERIMENT)" that the series has been renewed for a second season. Shooting of season 2 took place for seven weeks throughout summer 2017, with the episodes expected to be released later in the year.

On November 16, 2017, Rhett and Link released the trailer for Buddy System season 2. The second season was released November 29, 2017.

== Accolades ==
Year	Award	Category	Nominee	Result	Ref.
2017	7th Streamy Awards	Best Comedy Series		Won	
2017	7th Streamy Awards	Best Direction	John Fortenberry	Won	
2018	8th Streamy Awards	Best Comedy Series		Nominated	
