= The Lost Causes of Bleak Creek =

Fiction novel by Rhett and Link

- Author: Rhett James McLaughlin, Charles Lincoln "Link" Neal III and Lance Rubin
- Publisher: Crown Publishing Group
- Publication date: October 29, 2019

The Lost Causes of Bleak Creek is a young adult fiction novel written by Rhett and Link and Lance Rubin and published by Crown Publishing Group on October 29, 2019.

== Background ==
The book was written by Rhett McLaughlin and Link Neal and Lance Rubin. The book was announced in February 2019 and a preview of the book was released in May 2019. The book was published on October 29, 2019, by Crown Publishing Group. The protagonists Rex McClendon and Leif Nelson are based on the authors Rhett McLaughlin and Link Neal respectively. The story is set in the fictional town of Bleak Creek, North Carolina, which is based on Buies Creek, North Carolina.

== Plot ==
High school freshmen and best friends, Rex and Leif, are working on making a horror film called PolterDog. During one of the scenes they were filming, Alicia accidentally knocks over and injures the head of the Whitewood Reformatory School. As punishment, Alicia is sent to the reform school.

== Reception ==
Writing in the Seattle Book Review, Christina Boswell compared the book to Stranger Things and said "it was just good clean fun. I would highly recommend it!" The book was a finalist for best horror novel in the 2019 Goodreads Choice Awards. The book reached 9th place on The New York Times best sellers list for hardcover fiction on the week of November 17, 2019. According to NPD BookScan, the book was the 6th best selling hardcover fiction book on the week ending in November 2, 2019.
