= Josh Scherer =

American celebrity chef and internet personality (born 1992)

- Born: April 25, 1992 (age 34); Columbia, Maryland
- Education: University of California, Los Angeles
- Occupations: Chef; Internet Personality
- Spouse: Julia Levy (m. 2024)

YouTube information
- Channel: Mythical Kitchen
- Subscribers: 4.39 million
- Views: 1.60 billion
- Last updated: June 11, 2026

Josh Scherer (born April 25, 1992) is an American chef and internet personality who is best known as the host of the YouTube channel Mythical Kitchen. Prior to hosting Mythical Kitchen, he was also the culinary producer for the YouTube web series Good Mythical Morning.

He has also written two cookbooks, including The Mythical Cookbook, which became a #1 New York Times bestseller.

== Early life ==
Josh Scherer was born on April 25, 1992, in Columbia, Maryland. He has one older brother, Jon. He grew up in the Little Saigon neighborhood of Westminster, California.

For the majority of his childhood, Scherer was raised by his dad in a single-parent household. By age 14, Josh was estranged from his mother, who was believed to have suffered from schizophrenia.

Josh has said that growing up "no one really knew how to cook" at home and they didn't have a lot of money. At a young age, Josh began watching Food Network which inspired his love of cooking. His father noticed him watching cooking shows and by age 11, Josh was put in charge of cooking nightly dinners for his father, brother and himself. Josh credits his dad for encouraging him to follow his dreams.

His father died during a surgery when Josh was 19. At age 24, Josh was notified of his mother's death.

Scherer graduated from Trabuco Hills High School where he played varsity basketball. He attended UC Santa Barbara before transferring to the University of California, Los Angeles (UCLA). While there, he was a track and field athlete, competing in men's hammer throw, discus and shot put.

Scherer is Jewish and has spoken about his heritage in multiple episodes of Last Meals.

== Career ==
While in college, Scherer ran a food blog called Culinary Bro-Down, which later inspired his first cookbook of the same name. Three months after starting it in 2013, it was nominated by Saveur magazine in the Best Food Blog Awards category. Scherer also said that he honed his cooking skills by watching the Food Network. Additionally he began writing about food for Mojo, a column in the blog for UCLA's Daily Bruin.

From late 2014 until mid-2015, Scherer was a columnist for Maxim magazine, where he wrote articles about food, primarily for a column called Bite Club. From 2015 to 2016, Scherer was a senior food writer and associate food editor for Los Angeles Magazine.

In 2017, he released his first cookbook The Culinary Bro-Down Cookbook, inspired by his blog of the same name, that he ran while in college.

After sending a copy of his cookbook to Mythical Entertainment, he was brought on as the culinary producer for the YouTube web series Good Mythical Morning. In 2019 he began hosting his own spinoff show called Food Fears. In 2020, he launched the YouTube channel Mythical Kitchen. The content Mythical Kitchen produces includes various video series, its most well known being Last Meals, where a famous guest star shares what their ideal last meal would be and is served that meal while being interviewed by Josh. That same year, Scherer launched the podcast A Hot Dog Is a Sandwich that he co-hosts with fellow Mythical Kitchen chef Nicole Enayati.

In 2024, Scherer and the YouTube comedy duo Rhett & Link released the cookbook The Mythical Cookbook. It was a #1 New York Times bestseller in the Advice, How-To & Miscellaneous category for one week.

Scherer, along with fellow YouTubers Michelle Khare and Angela Giarratana, appeared on the second installment of Jeopardy! YouTube Edition in 2026, which he won. During the pre-briefing, a Jeopardy! producer revealed Scherer had passed the Jeopardy! Anytime test some years earlier, thereby making him eligible to potentially be a contestant on the main show, but Scherer had not seen the email inviting him to the next round.

== Personal life ==
Scherer married Julia Levy in 2024.

== Awards and nominations ==
Year	Award	Category	Result	Ref.
2019	9th Streamy Awards	Food	Nominated	

== Bibliography ==
Year	Title	Publisher
2017	The Culinary Bro-Down Cookbook ISBN 9781455595426	Grand Central Life & Style
2024	Rhett & Link Present: The Mythical Cookbook ISBN 9780063323964	Harvest
