= Street Smart (2026 film) =

2026 film by Catherine Hardwicke

- Directed by: Catherine Hardwicke
- Written by: Catherine Hardwicke; Nic Sheff
- Produced by: Catherine Hardwicke; Natalie Marciano; Jamie R. Thompson
- Starring: Isabelle Fuhrman; Yara Shahidi; Michael Cimino; Daniel Zovatto; Miles McKenna; Skylar Astin; Paris Jackson; Harvey Guillén; Skeet Ulrich; Virginia Madsen; Marcia Gay Harden
- Cinematography: Elliot Davis
- Edited by: Waldemar Centeno
- Music by: Harry Gregson-Williams
- Production companies: G-BASE; Poster Child Pictures; New Dimensions; Rebel Entertainment
- Release date: June 18, 2026 (Bentonville Film Festival)
- Running time: 101 minutes
- Country: United States
- Language: English

Street Smart is a 2026 American drama film directed by Catherine Hardwicke and written by Hardwicke and Nic Sheff. It stars Isabelle Fuhrman, Yara Shahidi, Michael Cimino, Daniel Zovatto, Miles McKenna, Skylar Astin, Paris Jackson, Harvey Guillén, Skeet Ulrich, Virginia Madsen, and Marcia Gay Harden.

== Premise ==
Unhoused skaters and indie musicians struggle through daily life in Venice, Los Angeles.

== Cast ==
- Isabelle Fuhrman as Ali
- Yara Shahidi as Stella
- Michael Cimino as Cal
- Daniel Zovatto as Dillon
- Skeet Ulrich as Sarge
- Marcia Gay Harden as Dr. Partovi
- Virginia Madsen as Beth
- Miles McKenna as Leo
- Skylar Astin as Trevor
- Paris Jackson as Lil Rocky
- Harvey Guillén as Danny G
- Kaitlyn Kemp as Zora
- Isiah Hilt as Drex
- Bevin Bru as Isa
- Rio Mangini as Heroji
- J.J. Green as Frankie
- Sylvester Powell as Freddie
- Sally Struthers as Bunny
- Tyson Ritter as Gavin
- Jon Curry as Ali's Father
- Colleen Camp as Real Estate Agent
- Les Brandt as Angry Gil
- Craig Frosty Silva as Officer Martinez
- Sam Hambrecht as Bleach Blonde
- Larry Taira Soo as Engineer Kai
- Wallette Watson as Rusty Wells
- Casey Simpson as Zora's Crush Griffin
- Thor Knai as Swedish Stian
- JT Garcia as College Boy Jake
- Jake Golden as College Boy Kyle
- Peter Lee Thomas as Photographer Marty
- Oliver Hibbs Wyman as Glow Dog
- Heather Mazur as Jogger Amy
- Max Figueroa as Co-Worker Max

== Production ==
In February 2025, it was announced that the cast would include Isabelle Fuhrman, Yara Shahidi, Daniel Zovatto, Michael Cimino, and Miles McKenna. Executive producers include Fuhrman, Zovatto, Gerard Butler, Batia Parnass, David J Lasky and Michael Arata, among others. Mona May and Chris Douridas are also part of the production.

In March 2025, it was announced that Harvey Guillén had been cast in the film. Later that same month, it was announced that Skeet Ulrich, Paris Jackson, Skylar Astin, Marcia Gay Harden, Virginia Madsen, Sally Struthers and Tyson Ritter had been cast and that principal photography had concluded in Los Angeles. Harwicke discussed turning the film into a television show.

== Release ==
The film premiered on June 18, 2026, at the Bentonville Film Festival.
