= Ear Biscuits =

Podcast by Rhett and Link

- Genre: Entertainment
- Language: English

Cast and voices
- Hosted by: Rhett and Link

Technical specifications
- Audio format: Podcast

Publication
- No. of seasons: 3
- No. of episodes: 498 (as of 25 December 2025)
- Original release: September 27, 2013
- Provider: Audacy, Inc.
- Updates: Weekly

Reception
- Cited for: 2016 Shorty Award winner

Related
- Website: youtube.com/earbiscuits

Ear Biscuits with Rhett and Link, also simply called Ear Biscuits, is an American entertainment podcast hosted by comedic duo Rhett and Link.

== Overview ==
On September 27, 2013, Rhett and Link launched Ear Biscuits. The podcast debuted in the US on the iTunes charts at No. 22. and it is described as intimate discussions with each other such as how they became blood brothers, their close encounters with death, and more. They have interviewed other notable Internet personalities including Grace Helbig, Julian Smith, Philip DeFranco, PewDiePie, and Rainn Wilson. The show has had live recordings on VidCon as well as Rhett-and-Link-only episodes each month.

On March 27, 2017, the podcast returned from a hiatus with a new video format on their latest channel, This Is Mythical, and has moved to the Good Mythical Morning channel. The podcast continues to be released on iTunes and SoundCloud, as well as Spotify.

The second-season finale featured questions from previous guests on the show. On January 7, 2019, the podcast was moved from the Good Mythical Morning YouTube channel to its own separate channel entitled This Is Mythical. Rhett and Link's other content tends to be more heavily edited while Ear Biscuits is more conversational and unscripted. Each episode has a theme or topic, however, because the show is unscripted the conversation often lacks direction. The podcast began in 2013 and by 2021 had produced 300 episodes. New episodes are released every Monday and range from 70 to 90 minutes in length. Episode 79 titled KingBach, features an interview with Andrew Bachelor.

The show aired two episodes where Rhett and Link discussed their relationship with Christianity and how they left the faith. In America Magazine, Patrick Manning explains that Christians leaving their religion and deconstructing their faith in digital spaces has been a growing trend. Manning notes that although Rhett and Link's public departure from Christianity was a risk, their following's response was overwhelmingly positive and empathetic. He also addresses the common responses of Christian communities to public deconversions and suggests that criticism and rejection will only lead to more people leaving the faith. Instead, Manning suggests that churches should create spaces where Christians feel more comfortable asking questions and expressing doubts about their faith. Benjamin Hough of Answers in Genesis criticized the episodes and argued that the four science related points brought up by Rhett were incorrect. Writing for The Gospel Coalition, Alisa Childers argues that the persuasive power of their deconversions stories was largely due to their popularity and familiarity. Rhett later wrote a song that addresses the reactions from Christian communities.

In the October 13, 2025 episode, "Rhett's Heart Surgery Journey," Rhett and Link announced their decision to take an indefinite break from the podcast at the end of 2025. They stated the decision was made to mitigate stress and avoid spreading themselves too thinly, allowing them to focus on other creative passions at Mythical Entertainment, including an unannounced project for 2026. During the episode, McLaughlin provided personal context for the hiatus, revealing he had recently undergone a heart ablation procedure to treat atrial flutter and fibrillation. He confirmed this health scare was a major factor in the decision to reduce their workload. In the same announcement, he also launched his personal YouTube channel, @RhettMcLaughlin, as a less-demanding creative outlet.

The podcast released its final episode before the hiatus, titled "Our Ode to Ear Biscuits" (Episode 498), on December 21, 2025. Described by the hosts as a "one-stop shop anthology," the finale featured a retrospective on the show's twelve-year history, including clips from fan-favorite episodes such as their "Deconstruction" series and "The Lost Years." The episode also included a segment acknowledging the contributions of long-time producers Jenna and Jamie, and concluded with the duo reading an original "Ear Biscuits Poem" as a farewell to listeners.

== Reception ==
In the Chicago Tribune, Akeem Lawanson said that he is "obsessed with Rhett and Link's 'Ear Biscuits' podcast and [he] recommend[s] it to anyone that is curious about working in new media".

The show was ranked 23rd on Media Monitors' listener survey of top podcasts, which was taken between June 15 and 26, 2020. The show was also included on Edison Research's chart of top podcasts in the US between Q3 2021 and Q2 2022. The show was ranked number 33 on Podcast Magazine's October 2020 listener poll. As of July 2015, the podcast is number No. 14 on the iTunes US Comedy Charts.

=== Awards ===
Award	Date	Category	Result	Ref.
Shorty Awards	2016	Tech and Innovation: Podcast	Won	
Streamy Awards	2018	Podcast	Nominated	
Webby Awards	2019	Comedy Podcast	Nominated	
Webby Awards	2019	People's Voice Award for Best Host	Won	
Webby Awards	2020	Comedy Podcast	Honoree	
Webby Awards	2023	Best Co-Hosts	Honoree	
Signal Awards	2023	Best Co-Host Team	silver	

== Episodes ==
Season	Episodes	Originally released	
Season	Episodes	First released	Last released
1	53	September 27, 2013	October 10, 2014
2	33	January 30, 2015	September 11, 2015
3	190	March 26, 2017	Present

=== Season 1 ===
No.	Title	Guests	Release date
1	"Grace Helbig"	Grace Helbig	September 27, 2013
2	"Philip DeFranco"	Philip DeFranco	October 4, 2013
3	"Shane Dawson"	Shane Dawson	October 11, 2013
4	"Freddie Wong"	Freddie Wong	October 18, 2013
5	"Hannah Hart"	Hannah Hart	October 25, 2013
6	"GloZell Green"	GloZell Green	November 1, 2013
7	"Julian Smith"	Julian Smith	November 8, 2013
8	"Tyler Oakley"	Tyler Oakley	November 15, 2013
9	"Harley Morenstein"	Harley Morenstein	November 22, 2013
10	"Shay Carl Pt.1"	Shay Carl	November 29, 2013
11	"Shay Carl Pt.2"	Shay Carl	December 6, 2013
12	"Brittani Louise Taylor"	Brittani Louise Taylor	December 13, 2013
13	"Nice Peter"	Peter Shukoff	December 20, 2013
14	"Chester See"	Chester See	January 3, 2014
15	"Michael Stevens (Vsauce)"	Michael Stevens	January 10, 2014
16	"The Fine Brothers"	The Fine Brothers	January 17, 2014
17	"Dodger Leigh"	Dodger	January 24, 2014
18	"Vitaly"	Vitaly Zdorovetskiy	January 31, 2014
19	"Superwoman"	Lilly Singh	February 7, 2014
20	"Alphacat"	Iman Crosson	February 14, 2014
21	"Toby Turner"	Toby Turner	February 21, 2014
22	"Rhett & Link "Childhood""	N/A	February 28, 2014
23	"Mamrie Hart"	Mamrie Hart	March 7, 2014
24	"Michael Gallagher (Totally Sketch)"	Michael Gallagher	March 14, 2014
25	"Colleen Ballinger (Miranda Sings)"	Colleen Ballinger	March 21, 2014
26	"Rhett & Link "Girls""	N/A	March 28, 2014
27	"Pomplamoose"	Pomplamoose	April 4, 2014
28	"Jenna Marbles"	Jenna Marbles	April 11, 2014
29	"Troye Sivan"	Troye Sivan	April 18, 2014
30	"Rhett & Link "Our Song Writing Process""	N/A	April 25, 2014
31	"Swoozie"	Adande Thorne	May 2, 2014
32	"Smosh"	Anthony Padilla & Ian Hecox	May 9, 2014
33	"Flula"	Flula Borg	May 16, 2014
34	"Lindsey Stirling"	Lindsey Stirling	May 23, 2014
35	"Rhett & Link "Summer Jobs""	N/A	May 30, 2014
36	"Joe Bereta"	Joe Bereta	June 6, 2014
37	"iJustine"	iJustine	June 13, 2014
38	"Felicia Day"	Felicia Day	June 20, 2014
39	"Dane Boedigheimer"	Dane Boedigheimer	June 27, 2014
40	"John Green"	John Green	July 4, 2014
41	"Kingsley"	Kingsley	July 18, 2014
42	"Rhett & Link "Obsession""	N/A	July 25, 2014
43	"Devin Super Tramp"	Devin Graham	August 1, 2014
44	"Natalie Tran"	Natalie Tran	August 8, 2014
45	"TomSka"	TomSka	August 15, 2014
46	"Watsky"	George Watsky	August 22, 2014
47	"Elle and Blair Fowler"	Elle and Blair Fowler	August 29, 2014
48	"Hank Green"	Hank Green	September 5, 2014
49	"Rhett & Link "2014 Time Capsule""	N/A	September 12, 2014
50	"Mitchell Davis"	Mitchell Davis	September 19, 2014
51	"Matthew Santoro"	Matthew Santoro	September 26, 2014
52	"Grace Helbig Pt. 2"	Grace Helbig	October 3, 2014
53	"PewDiePie"	PewDiePie	October 10, 2014

=== Season 2 ===
No.	Title	Guests	Release date
54	"Rainn Wilson"	Rainn Wilson	January 30, 2015
55	"Lee Newton"	Lee Newton	February 6, 2015
56	"DeStorm Power"	DeStorm Power	February 13, 2015
57	"Josh Sundquist"	Josh Sundquist	February 20, 2015
58	"Rhett & Link “Sports”"	N/A	February 27, 2015
59	"Steve Kardynal"	Steve Kardynal	March 6, 2015
60	"Alexis Ohanian"	Alexis Ohanian	March 13, 2015
61	"Markiplier"	Markiplier	March 20, 2015
62	"Bart Baker"	Bart Baker	March 27, 2015
63	"Rhett & Link “Weirdest Science Experiments”"	N/A	April 3, 2015
64	"Kassem G"	Kassem G	April 10, 2015
65	"Anna Akana"	Anna Akana	April 17, 2015
66	"Corridor Digital"	Sam Gorski & Niko Pueringer	April 24, 2015
67	"Tay Zonday"	Tay Zonday	May 1, 2015
68	"Olga Kay"	Olga Kay	May 8, 2015
69	"Rhett & Link “Most Bizarre Rites of Passage”"	N/A	May 15, 2015
70	"Sorted Food"	Barry Taylor & Ben Ebbrell	May 22, 2015
71	"Epic Lloyd"	Lloyd Ahlquist	May 29, 2015
72	"Stampy Cat"	Joseph Garrett	June 5, 2015
73	"Rhett & Link “Ridiculous But True Wal-Mart Stories”"	N/A	June 12, 2015
74	"Steve Zaragoza"	Steve Zaragoza	June 19, 2015
75	"Mystery Guitar Man"	Joe Penna	June 26, 2015
76	"Wassabi Productions"	Roi Fabito & Alex Burriss	July 3, 2015
77	"Rhett & Link “Head Injuries that Unlocked Geniuses”"	N/A	July 10, 2015
78	"Ingrid Nilsen"	Ingrid Nilsen	July 17, 2015
79	"KingBach"	King Bach	July 24, 2015
80	"Rhett & Link Live"	N/A	July 31, 2015
81	"Charlie McDonnell"	Charlotte McDonnell (Formerly Charlie McDonnell)	August 7, 2015
82	"The Gregory Brothers"	The Gregory Brothers	August 14, 2015
83	"Laci Green"	Laci Green	August 21, 2015
84	"Charles Trippy"	Charles Trippy	August 28, 2015
85	"Louis Cole"	Louis Cole	September 4, 2015
86	"Rhett & Link “Season 2 Finale”"	N/A	September 11, 2015

=== Season 3 ===
No.	Title	Guests	Release date
87	""Our Road Rage Incident" ft. Rhett & Link"	N/A	March 27, 2017
88	"Killer Bees Attack ft. Clyde Steese"	Clyde Steese	April 3, 2017
89	""How Do Millennials Date?" ft. Lizzie & Saagar"	Lizzie Bassett & Saagar Shaikh	April 10, 2017
90	"The Perfect Morgan Freeman Impression ft. Dave DeAndrea"	Dave DeAndrea	April 17, 2017
91	"The Let's Get Personal ft. Rhett & Link"	N/A	April 24, 2017
92	"Hollywood Conspiracy Theories ft. Lizzie & Ellie"	Lizzie Bassett & Ellie McElvain	May 1, 2017
93	"Have We Crossed the Line? ft. Rhett & Link"	N/A	May 8, 2017
94	"Creating Your Own Success ft Olan Rogers"	Olan Rogers	May 15, 2017
95	"Inspiration vs. Plagiarism ft. Rhett & Link"	N/A	May 22, 2017
96	"The World's Longest Treasure Hunt ft. Kevin"	Kevin Kostelnik	May 29, 2017
97	"How Do You Manage Stress? ft. Rhett & Link"	N/A	June 5, 2017
98	"Betting On Yourself ft Jason Markk"	Jason Markk	June 12, 2017
99	"4 Insane Loopholes And The People Who Found Them ft. Kevin"	Kevin Kostelnik	June 19, 2017
100	"100th Episode Fan Q&A From VidCon"	N/A	June 26, 2017
101	"The Alex Punch Story ft. Stevie & Alex"	Stevie Wynne Levine & Alex Punch	July 3, 2017
102	"Suspicious Celebrity Deaths ft. Lizzie & Ellie"	Lizzie Bassett & Ellie McElvain	July 10, 2017
103	"The Life of Kevin ft. Stevie & Kevin"	Stevie Wynne Levine & Kevin Kostelnik	July 17, 2017
104	"Positive Thinking ft. Colin & Micah"	Colin J. Morris & Micah Gordon	July 24, 2017
105	"Buddy System Stories ft. Rhett, Link, & Director Steve Pink"	Steve Pink	July 31, 2017
106	"Adventures in Six Flags & New York City ft. Rhett & Link"	N/A	August 7, 2017
107	"Isolate Yourself With Yourself ft Matthew"	Matthew Dwyer	August 14, 2017
108	"Is It Ever OK to Lie? ft Lizzie"	Lizzie Bassett	August 21, 2017
109	"Thoughts on Confederate Statues"	N/A	August 28, 2017
110	"Digging Deep with a Paleontologist"	Dr. Emily Lindsey	September 4, 2017
111	"Embracing Immaturity"	Mike Criscimagna & Alex Punch	September 11, 2017
112	"Who Was The First Person to Shave?"	N/A	September 18, 2017
113	"Awkward Conversations with Teens ft. Mayim Bialik"	Mayim Bialik	September 25, 2017
114	"Our First Kiss Stories"	Becca Canote & Ellie McElvain	October 2, 2017
115	"Did We Actually Write Our Book?"	N/A	October 9, 2017
116	"Our Scariest Horror Movie Experiences"	N/A	October 16, 2017
117	"Should We Fear Artificial Intelligence? ft Veritasium"	Derek Muller	October 23, 2017
118	"What Did Your Dog Name You?"	N/A	October 30, 2017
119	"The Art of Picking A Fight"	N/A	November 6, 2017
120	"Our Stories From The Road"	N/A	November 13, 2017
121	"Our Throwback Thanks"	N/A	November 20, 2017
122	"Our Honest Response to Your Feedback"	N/A	November 27, 2017
123	""Childhood" Throwback Episode"	N/A	December 4, 2017
124	"Our Family Vacation Mishaps"	N/A	December 11, 2017
125	"What Makes Something Funny?"	N/A	December 18, 2017
126	"Christmas in North Carolina"	N/A	January 15, 2018
127	"Living In Ed Sheeran's Dream (Rabbit Hole)"	N/A	January 22, 2018
128	"Living Our Lost Possessions (Rabbit Hole)"	N/A	January 29, 2018
129	"Settling Your Disagreements (Fan Questions)"	N/A	February 5, 2018
130	"Fixing Your Love Life (Fan Questions)"	N/A	February 12, 2018
131	"Love and Immortality (Rabbit Hole)"	N/A	February 19, 2018
132	"Ask Us Anything (AMA)"	N/A	February 26, 2018
133	"Solving Your Strange Job Problems (Fan Questions)"	N/A	March 5, 2018
134	"Our College Life Advice (Fan Questions)"	N/A	March 12, 2018
135	"Our Deserted Island Survival Kit (Rabbit Hole)"	N/A	March 19, 2018
136	"Our Worst GMM Experience (AMA)"	N/A	March 26, 2018
137	"Link’s RV Trip Fail"	N/A	April 2, 2018
138	"The Birds And The Bees - Parenting 101 (Fan Questions)"	N/A	April 9, 2018
139	"Our Bucket Lists (Rabbit Hole)"	N/A	April 16, 2018
140	"Witnessing Childbirth (AMA)"	N/A	April 23, 2018
141	"Oreos Vs. Double Stuf (Taking Calls)"	N/A	April 30, 2018
142	"Our Solo Excursions"	N/A	May 7, 2018
143	"Why You Procrastinate (Rabbit Hole)"	N/A	May 14, 2018
144	"Rhett's Proposal Story (AMA)"	N/A	May 21, 2018
145	"On Life, Death, and Turning 40"	N/A	May 28, 2018
146	"Resolving Your Conflicts (Taking Calls)"	N/A	June 4, 2018
147	"Looking Back At Photos (Rabbit Hole)"	N/A	June 11, 2018
148	"Is Being An Only Child Better? (AMA)"	N/A	June 18, 2018
149	"Our Summer Memories"	N/A	June 25, 2018
150	"How Do You Cope With Losing a Loved One?"	N/A	July 2, 2018
151	"How Do You Survive A Summer Job?"	N/A	July 9, 2018
152	"Rhett's Personal Obsessions"	N/A	July 16, 2018
153	"Where Do Our Songs Come From?"	N/A	July 23, 2018
154	"Are Magicians Actually Cool?"	N/A	July 30, 2018
155	"When Is Fun Too Dangerous?"	N/A	August 6, 2018
156	"Has Music Become Too Disposable?"	N/A	August 13, 2018
157	"Is Australia The Greatest Place On Earth?"	N/A	August 20, 2018
158	"Is Back-To-School A Feeling?"	N/A	August 27, 2018
159	"Are Farts Actually Funny?"	N/A	September 3, 2018
160	"Is Texting Ruining Friendships?"	N/A	September 10, 2018
161	"Do YouTubers Watch YouTube?"	N/A	September 17, 2018
162	"Is Watching Sports a Waste of Time?"	N/A	September 24, 2018
163	"Should The '90s Come Back?"	N/A	October 1, 2018
164	"How Do We Deal With YouTube Burnout?"	N/A	October 8, 2018
165	"Do YouTubers Watch YouTube? Part 2"	N/A	October 15, 2018
166	"Do Changing Seasons Affect Your Brain?"	N/A	October 22, 2018
167	"Does "Teen Wolf" The Movie Suck?"	N/A	October 29, 2018
168	"What Happened to Toys?"	N/A	November 5, 2018
169	"Has Touring Changed Us?"	N/A	November 12, 2018
170	"Is Privacy Dead?"	N/A	November 19, 2018
171	"What If The Day Was 12 Hours Longer?"	N/A	November 26, 2018
172	"Is Thanksgiving Better Without Family?"	N/A	December 3, 2018
173	"AMA: What Would We Tell Our Younger Selves?"	N/A	December 10, 2018
174	"What Are Our Top 10 Moments of 2018?"	N/A	December 17, 2018
175	"What Are We Most Looking Forward To In 2019?"	N/A	January 7, 2019
176	"What Happened Over Break?"	N/A	January 14, 2019
177	"How Do We Party?"	N/A	January 21, 2019
178	"What Are Our Top 10 Most Influential TV Shows?"	N/A	January 28, 2019
179	"Should Link Get Back on Instagram?"	N/A	February 4, 2019
180	"AMA: What's The Worst Practical Joke We Played On Someone?"	N/A	February 11, 2019
181	"How Did We Survive Before Cell Phones?"	N/A	February 18, 2019
182	"What Are Our Greatest Physical Feats?"	N/A	February 25, 2019
183	"What is Our Relationship w/ Gross Foods?"	N/A	March 4, 2019
184	"What Happens When Friends Go On Opposite Vacations?"	N/A	March 11, 2019
185	"How Was London?"	N/A	March 18, 2019
186	"Are We Our True Selves on Screen?"	N/A	March 25, 2019
187	"How Do We Deal With Sadness?"	N/A	April 1, 2019
188	"What Happened on Our Spring Break?"	N/A	April 8, 2019
189	"Can We Be Friends With Robots?"	N/A	April 15, 2019
190	"Did Our Careers Just Peak?"	N/A	April 22, 2019
191	"If You Were a Boat, What Type of Boat Would You Be?"	N/A	April 29, 2019
192	"What Makes Someone Creepy?"	N/A	May 6, 2019
193	"What is the Greatest Game Show of All Time?"	N/A	May 13, 2019
194	"How Do We Deal With A Medical Crisis?"	N/A	May 20, 2019
195	"Do We Like Getting Recognised In Public?"	N/A	May 27, 2019
196	"Were the Twenties the Best Years of Our Lives?"	N/A	June 3, 2019
197	"What’s the Secret to 18+ Years of Marriage?"	N/A	June 10, 2019
198	"Is it Ever Okay to Kill Someone?"	N/A	June 17, 2019
199	"What If Our Dogs Died?"	N/A	June 24, 2019
200	"Evolve or Die: 200th Episode Special"	N/A	July 1, 2019
201	"Do We Consider Los Angeles Home?"	N/A	July 8, 2019
202	"What’s It Like to Sleep on a Bus"	N/A	July 15, 2019
203	"Are We Too Nice??"	N/A	July 22, 2019
204	"What Happened In Thailand And The UK?"	N/A	August 19, 2019
205	"What Happened To Rhett’s Mom In Scotland?"	N/A	August 26, 2019
206	"Do We Interrupt Each Other Too Much?"	N/A	September 2, 2019
207	"What Would You Do If Robots Took Your Job?"	N/A	September 9, 2019
208	"Why Is Rhett Growing Out His Hair and Beard?"	N/A	September 16, 2019
209	"What’s It Like Inside NASA?"	N/A	September 23, 2019
210	"The Results Of Our Sleep Experiment?"	N/A	September 30, 2019
211	"How Link Escaped A Pyramid Scheme"	N/A	October 7, 2019
212	"Our Camping vs. VR Weekends"	N/A	October 14, 2019
213	"A Lost Artifact From Our Childhood"	N/A	October 21, 2019
214	"How Our Childhood Informed Bleak Creek"	N/A	October 28, 2019
215	"Can We Speak Gen Z?"	N/A	November 4, 2019
216	"Our True Feelings On Self-Promotion"	N/A	November 11, 2019
217	"Link’s Struggle with Friendship"	N/A	November 18, 2019
218	"How We Balance Living In The Moment And Documenting The Moment"	N/A	November 25, 2019
219	"We Solve Some Bleak Creek Mysteries"	N/A	December 2, 2019
220	"Our Opposite Coast Thanksgivings"	N/A	December 9, 2019
221	"Our Top 10 Moments Of 2019"	N/A	December 16, 2019
222	"We’re Bringing It Back"	N/A	January 6, 2020
223	"Our Holiday Break Highs and Lows"	N/A	January 13, 2020
224	"Our Lost Years"	N/A	January 20, 2020
225	"Our Years As Missionaries"	N/A	January 27, 2020
226	"Rhett’s Spiritual Deconstruction"	N/A	February 3, 2020
227	"Link’s Spiritual Deconstruction"	N/A	February 10, 2020
228	"Our First Memories"	N/A	February 17, 2020
229	"Our Experiences After The Lost Years Series"	N/A	February 24, 2020
230	"Are We Scared Of Hell?"	N/A	March 2, 2020
231	"Link’s Apology"	N/A	March 9, 2020
232	"The Life and Loss of Ben, Our Other Best Friend"	N/A	March 16, 2020
233	"Link’s Strange Physical Therapy Visit"	N/A	March 23, 2020
234	"Our First Episode Apart (Coming to Grips with Coronavirus)"	N/A	March 30, 2020
235	"Our New Normal (How The Coronavirus Changed Our Lives)"	N/A	April 6, 2020
236	"Our Quarantine Activities"	N/A	April 13, 2020
237	"Our Top 10 Favourite Movies Of All Time"	N/A	April 20, 2020
238	"How Quarantine Has Affected Our Family Dynamics"	N/A	April 27, 2020
239	"Our Full Story: From RhettandLinKreations To Mythical Entertainment"	N/A	May 4, 2020
240	"We Gave Our Kids A Survey About Us"	N/A	May 11, 2020
241	"If We Could Relive A Moment From Our Lives"	N/A	May 18, 2020
242	"Our Experiences With Therapy"	N/A	May 25, 2020
243	"Our Most Irrational Fears"	N/A	June 1, 2020
244	"Are We Having A Mid-Life Crisis?"	N/A	June 8, 2020
245	"Our Creative Spaces Over The Years"	N/A	June 15, 2020
246	"Our Life Firsts: First Kiss"	N/A	July 26, 2020
247	"If We Could Witness Any Historical Event"	N/A	August 2, 2020
248	"Our Vacation Mishaps"	N/A	August 10, 2020
249	"Our Biggest Regrets"	N/A	August 17, 2020
250	"How Would We Frame Someone For Murder?"	N/A	August 24, 2020
251	"Do We Have A Voice Inside Of Our Heads?"	N/A	August 31, 2020
252	"Link's New Interest"	N/A	September 7, 2020
253	"Is Link Actually Competitive?"	N/A	September 14, 2020
254	"Should Link's Family Get A Kitten?"	N/A	September 21, 2020
255	"Our Next Isolated Getaways"	N/A	September 28, 2020
256	"Link's Camping Night Of Horror"	N/A	October 5, 2020
257	"Rhett's Revelatory Solo Trip"	N/A	October 12, 2020
258	"What Happened To Link's Face?"	N/A	October 19, 2020
259	"Do We Believe In Ghosts?"	N/A	October 26, 2020
260	"Would We Be Friends If We Met As Adults?"	N/A	November 2, 2020
261	"What We Actually Think Of Millennials"	N/A	November 9, 2020
262	"Our Wild Animal Best Friends"	N/A	November 16, 2020
263	"Our 2020 Amazon Purchases"	N/A	November 23, 2020
264	"Are We Weird?"	N/A	November 30, 2020
265	"How Our Christmas Traditions Have Changed Throughout The Years"	N/A	November 7, 2020
266	"Embarrassing Holiday Memories"	N/A	December 14, 2020
267	"Our Top 10 Moments Of 2020"	N/A	December 21, 2020
268	"Our Father-Son Death Valley Trip"	N/A	January 11, 2021
269	"Rhett Surprises His Wife For Her Birthday"	N/A	January 18, 2021
270	"When Have We Changed Our Minds?"	N/A	January 25, 2021
271	"We Faked A Prank Video"	N/A	February 1, 2021
272	"Our Most Memorable Meal"	N/A	February 8, 2021
273	"Rhett's Spiritual Deconstruction - One Year Later"	N/A	February 15, 2021
274	"Link's Spiritual Deconstruction - One Year Later"	N/A	February 22, 2021
275	"Link's New Kitten"	N/A	March 1, 2021
276	"Amazing And Inexplicable Coincidences"	N/A	March 8, 2021
277	"What Makes Us Laugh?"	N/A	March 15, 2021
278	"What Would We Bring Back From Our Childhood?"	N/A	March 22, 2021
279	"Strange Secret Habits Of Successful People"	N/A	March 29, 2021
280	"Things We Just Can’t Live Without"	N/A	April 5, 2021
281	"A New Adult In The Neal Household"	N/A	April 12, 2021
282	"Which Commune Would We Join?"	N/A	April 19, 2021
