= Miles McKenna =

American actor and vlogger (born 1995)

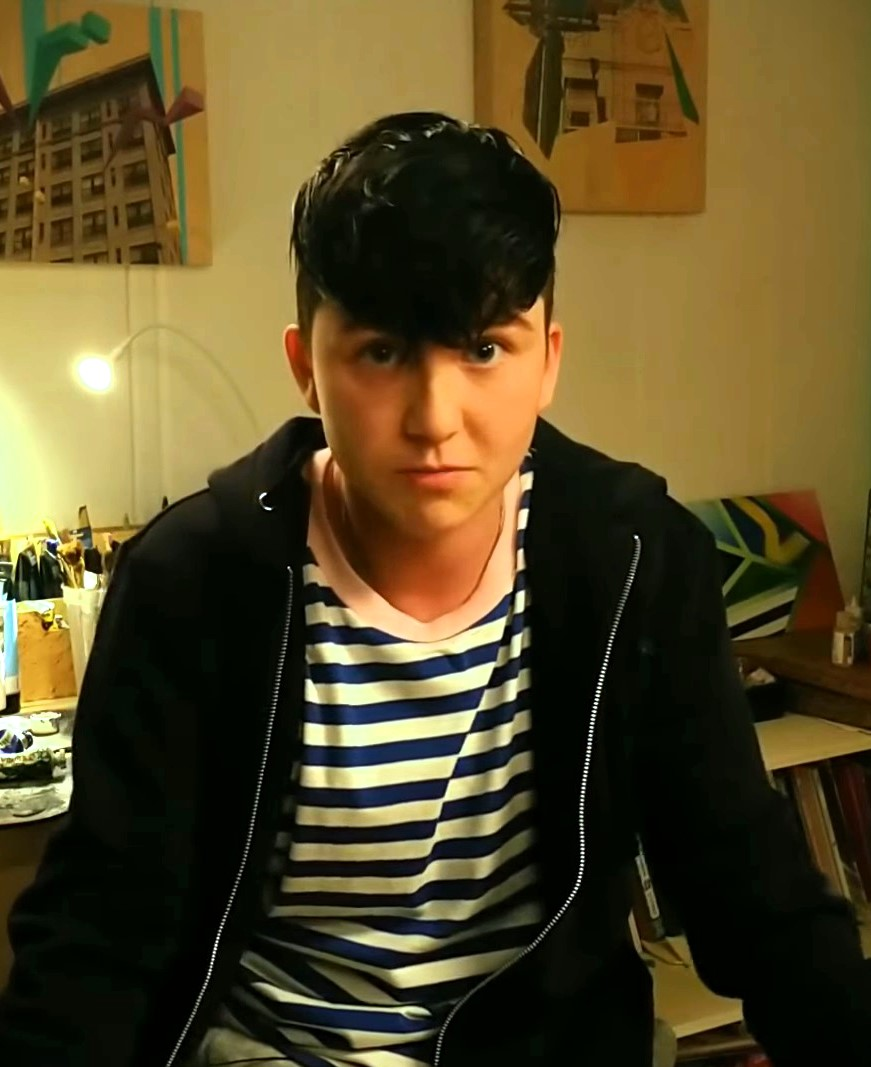
- Miles McKenna as Alex on Guilty Party.
- Born: November 2, 1995 (age 30)
- Occupations: Vlogger, actor, LGBTQ advocate

YouTube information
- Channel: MilesChronicles
- Years active: 2012–present
- Genres: LGBTQ, comedy, commentary, vlogs
- Subscribers: 1.17 million
- Views: 117.9 million
- Last updated: March 10, 2026

Miles Aaron McKenna (born November 2, 1995) is an American vlogger, actor, and LGBTQ advocate. McKenna is among YouTube's most prominent trans creators with over one million subscribers. His videos incorporate comedic skits and often include commentary on gender identity and other LGBTQ issues. Through his videos, McKenna documented his coming out and his transition, including the effects of hormone replacement therapy and top surgery.

== Early life and vlogging ==
Based in Los Angeles, California, McKenna grew up in a strict religious family. As a teenager, he lived in Orange County, California and started making confessional-style videos for YouTube in 2011. McKenna "hated being seen as a girl" and after a friend described McKenna as "a boy trapped in a girl's body", McKenna started to question how he really felt about his gender identity. McKenna came out in 2015.

During McKenna's transition, he documented the process through his vlogs, including changes in his appearance and struggles with his family. In a January 2017 video entitled "So I'm Trans", McKenna revealed himself as non-binary and announced intentions to legally change his name. McKenna began taking testosterone as part of hormone replacement therapy. He developed a severe case of cystic acne on his face and body. He attempted to address the skin condition with his physician, was placed on antibiotics for 60 days, and made dietary changes. The condition cleared up after he stopped taking testosterone. McKenna later elected to have top surgery and identified as a trans man at the time.

== Later career ==
As a YouTuber, McKenna vlogs under the account MilesChronicles and has some 1.18 million subscribers. He began vlogging under a similar account name for four years previous to his transition. The account features comedy, skits, and commentary on topics such as gender identity and gender dysphoria. Subscribers to McKenna's channel have said that his videos empowered them to be open about their gender identities. McKenna also has over 811,000 followers on Instagram.

McKenna is partnered with the network Fullscreen and hosted the short-form docuseries Hella Gay with Miles McKenna, which featured man on the street interviews. He also had a role on the interactive drama series Guilty Party. McKenna signed with the United Talent Agency in August 2017. McKenna headlined the 2017 Love is Love tour alongside Shannon Beveridge and Rebecca Black. McKenna played the character Justin in All Night, a 2018 comedy web series on Hulu. At the 10th Shorty Awards, McKenna won the award for Best LGBTQ+ Account. He was also presenter for the 11th Shorty Awards in 2019.

As an openly transgender person, McKenna is frequently the target of harassment campaigns. Following a controversial Brown University study of "rapid onset gender dysphoria" in 2018, McKenna was among the digital influencers blamed for glamorizing the "transgender lifestyle". During VidCon 2019, McKenna was part of a panel on LGBTQ activism and awareness. During the session, moderator Stevie Wynne Levine deadnamed McKenna, using his pre-transition name and misgendering him. In Levine's apology, she stated that she did not know it was inappropriate. VidCon and panel presenters The Trevor Project both also issued apologies to McKenna. Following the cancellation of VidCon 2020 due to the COVID-19 pandemic, McKenna agreed to take part in a virtual panel with Elle Mills for VidCon Now.

McKenna's book about coming out, Out!: How To Be Your Authentic Self, was published in May 2020 and released on International Coming Out Day, October 6, 2020. The foreword is by fellow YouTuber Tyler Oakley. Some of the proceeds from the book go to GLSEN.

On October 12, 2020, McKenna released his first single, "Boys Will Be Boys", on Spotify.

== Filmography ==
Year	Title	Role	Notes
2017	Hella Gay With Miles Mckenna	Himself, Producer	TV series
2017-18	Guilty Party	Alex(S1)/Dan Rolland(S2)	AT&T series
2018	Good Girls Get High	Pizza Ken	Movie
2018	All Night	Justin	Hulu series
2020	Nocturne	Alexis	Amazon Prime Original
2023	Goosebumps	James	Disney+ TV Series
2025	911: Lone Star	Jax	Episode: "Impact"
2026	Street Smart	Leo	Movie
