= Rhett & Link =

YouTube comedy duo (born 1977 and 1978)

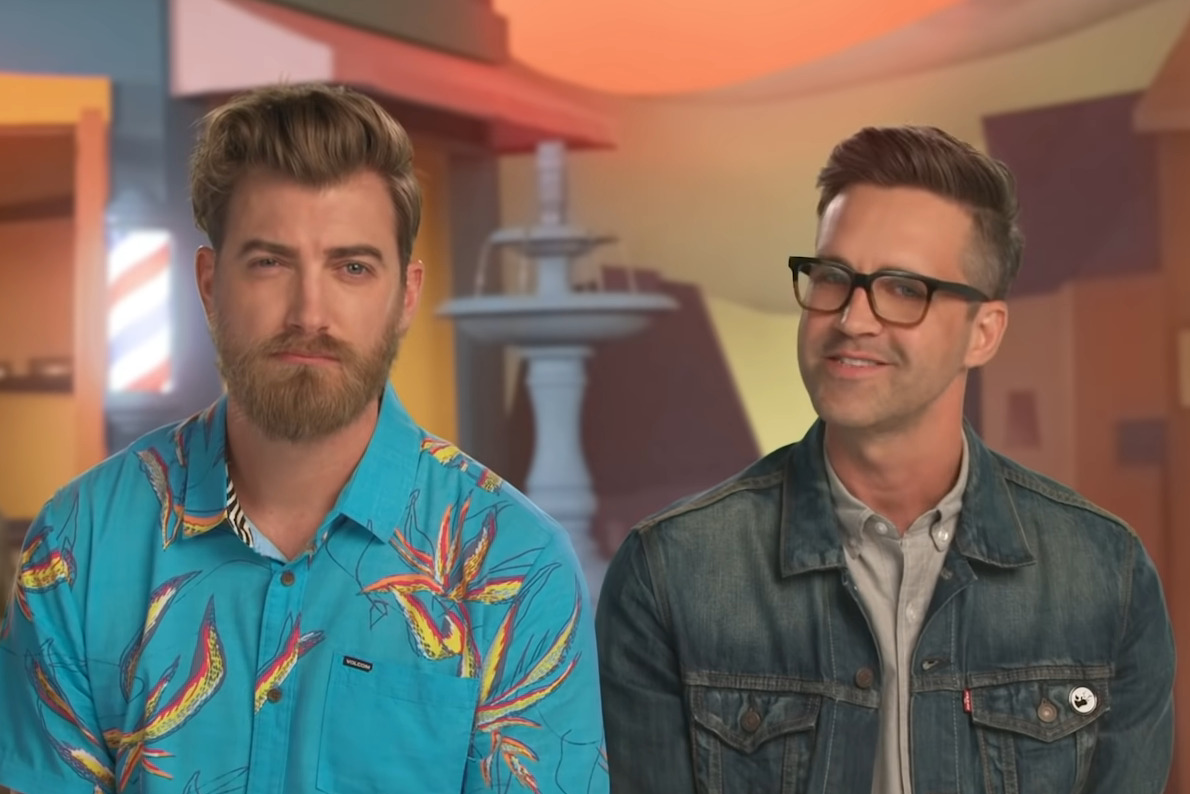
- McLaughlin (left) and Neal (right) in 2020
- Born: Rhett James McLaughlin; October 11, 1977 (age 49); Macon, Georgia, U.S. Charles Lincoln Neal III; June 1, 1978 (age 48); Durham, North Carolina, U.S.
- Education: North Carolina State University (BEng)
- Occupations: YouTubers; actors; musicians; comedians
- Years active: 2006–present

YouTube information
- Channel: Good Mythical Morning
- Genre: Comedy
- Subscribers: 19.7 million (Note: Total of 34.95 million across all channels: 5.4 million (Rhett & Link); 19.8 million (Good Mythical Morning); 4.3 million (Good Mythical MORE); 597 thousand (Ear Biscuits); 3.8 million (Mythical Kitchen); 415 thousand (Mythical Bits); 430 thousand (Buenos Y Miticos Dias))
- Views: 11 billion (Note: Total of 14.67 billion across all channels: 1.03 billion (Rhett & Link); 10.5 billion (Good Mythical Morning); 1.55 billion (Good Mythical MORE); 174.8 million (Ear Biscuits); 1.247 billion (Mythical Kitchen); 106.7 million (Mythical Bits); 64.3 million (Buenos Y Miticos Dias))
- Last updated: August 19, 2026
- Website: mythical.com

Rhett James McLaughlin (born October 11, 1977) and Charles Lincoln "Link" Neal III (born June 1, 1978), collectively known as Rhett & Link, are an American comedy duo. Since 2012, they have created and co-hosted the YouTube series Good Mythical Morning. Self-styled as "Internetainers", their other notable projects include comedic songs and sketches, their IFC series Rhett & Link: Commercial Kings, their scripted series Rhett & Link's Buddy System on YouTube Premium and Rhett & Link's Wonderhole, their podcast Ear Biscuits, and their novel The Lost Causes of Bleak Creek.

As social media influencers with numerous channels, they have a combined total of over 30 million subscribers. They were ranked the second most influential content creators in 2024 according to Rolling Stone and ranked #5 in Forbes’ Top Creators of 2026.

== Early lives and career ==
Rhett McLaughlin and Charles "Link" Neal first met on September 4, 1984, the date they started first grade at Buies Creek Elementary School in Buies Creek, Harnett County, North Carolina. They subsequently wrote a song and made a documentary about this meeting: Looking for Ms. Locklear. In an interview on The Tonight Show, they stated that they had to stay in during recess because both of them had written swear words on their desks. They were given coloring books to fill out with mythical creatures (such as unicorns), hence their YouTube channel name, Good Mythical Morning.

At age fourteen, they wrote a screenplay entitled Gutless Wonders and began shooting a film based on it. They shot only a couple of scenes, and the film was never finished. This screenplay ultimately was read in multiple episodes of Good Mythical Morning. In high school they shot a 25-minute film-parody on the tragedy of Oedipus Rex, with McLaughlin as Oedipus, and Neal as his father's servant. McLaughlin and Neal were both members of a Christian punk rock band as teenagers known as "The Wax Paper Dogz".

In 1996, they started college and were roommates at North Carolina State University, where Neal studied industrial engineering while McLaughlin studied civil engineering. McLaughlin graduated magna cum laude in December 2000, and Neal graduated summa cum laude in May 2001. They worked in their respective fields for a time, Neal at IBM and McLaughlin at Black & Veatch. They also made videos and performed comedy sketches for a religious organization, Cru. During their time at Cru, they began developing their signature comedy style as a duo, subsequently deciding to become full-time entertainers.

McLaughlin and Neal quit their jobs as engineers soon after graduating from college to shift their focus to their Christian evangelism with Cru. They made comedic videos for meetings and conferences after being inspired by the host at the first weekly Cru meeting they attended as freshmen at North Carolina State University. Later, they transitioned to making comedic YouTube videos full-time, without Christian ministry.

== Media properties ==
Under their production company Mythical Entertainment, the duo run a number of media properties, some starring themselves and some featuring other performers.

- Their flagship program is the YouTube channel Good Mythical Morning (often shortened to GMM), which has over 10.8 billion views and 19.5 million subscribers as of March 2026. It has a total of 3000 episodes, as of March 13, 2026. It is a talk show airing daily Monday to Friday, although in the summer, using the title "Good Mythical Summer", they produce three episodes per week.
- Good Mythical MORE (often shortened to GMMore) is the show's secondary channel, with new episodes released simultaneously with Good Mythical Morning. The shows are meant to be watched directly after GMM and is described as the "show after the show". It features a more unscripted, laid-back feeling, and usually expands upon topics covered in Good Mythical Morning. The channel had over 4.45 million subscribers and over 1.4 billion views as of September 2026.
- Mythical Kitchen (formerly This is Mythical, and Mythical), is a cooking channel hosted by Josh Scherer, the head chef on the show. He is supported by other chefs such as Nicole Enayati (née Hendizadeh), Trevor Evarts, Vianai "Vi" Austin, and Lily Burrola (née Cousins), as well as guest appearances by other members of the Mythical crew. The channel has a number of series on cooking unusual items, such as expensive versions of fast food, or homemade versions of popular snacks. Under earlier iterations, it featured bonus and behind the scenes videos, but has most recently been used for videos produced by and starring their crew. It has over 4.5 million subscribers and over 900 million views as of September 2026.
- The duo originally released comedy and musical videos on their main channel titled Rhett & Link. As new properties became more successful, the channel became inactive. The channel was revived in December 2019 with the release of several vlogs. The channel has since become home to one-off projects, including horror-comedy short films, and the semi-scripted series Wonderhole.
- Mythical Bits (formerly The Hey Hey Show) consists of skits from Rhett & Link. The channel has been inactive since August 2022.
- Mythical.com is the merchandising arm of Mythical Entertainment, selling Mythical and Rhett & Link branded products.
- The Mythical Society is Rhett & Link's subscription service that offers exclusive behind-the-scenes content, unique collectibles, and more.
- Mythical also produces a number of podcasts.
  - Ear Biscuits is a filmed podcast hosted by McLaughlin and Neal that has both audio versions that are released on various podcasting platforms, as well as a filmed version. It was originally presented on the GMM channel but was transferred to this channel on January 7, 2019. It has over 603,000 subscribers and more than 180 million views as of November 2025. As of December 2025, Ear Biscuits has gone on an indefinite break, with promises that more casual conversation and storytelling would be integrated into Good Mythical More.
  - A Hotdog is a Sandwich is a weekly podcast by Josh Scherer and Nicole Enayati of the Mythical Kitchen team, centering each episode on a different food-related debate.
  - Trevor Talks Too Much is a weekly audio and video podcast hosted by Trevor Evarts of the Mythical Kitchen team. Each episode features an interview-style discussion with Trevor and popular young creators, streamers, musicians, athletes, and more. The podcast was unofficially discontinued in December 2022.
  - Dispatches from Myrtle Beach is a weekly audio and video podcast started in June 2022 and hosted by Neal and his father Charles Neal, who lives in Myrtle Beach.
  - Best Friends Back, Alright! is a weekly audio-only podcast started in March 2022 and hosted by executive producer Stevie Wynne Levine and her high school best friend Neagheen Homaifar. The podcast was discontinued at the end of 2022.

=== Good Mythical Morning ===
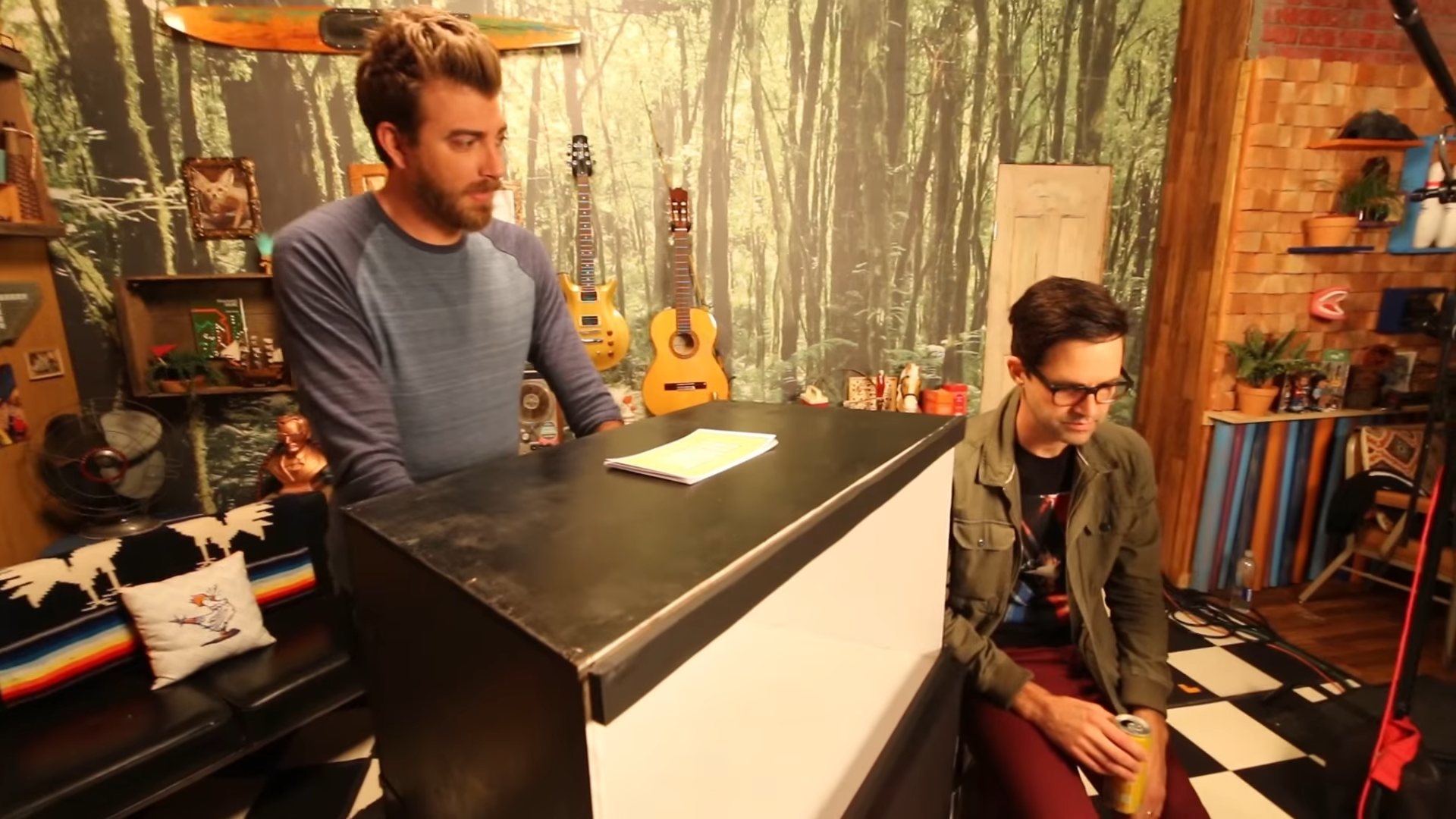
Rhett & Link on the set of Good Mythical Morning in 2016

On January 3, 2011, the duo launched a morning talk show, "Good Morning Chia Lincoln" in their studio, located in Fuquay-Varina, North Carolina, with an Abraham Lincoln shaped Chia Pet as a centerpiece, where they picked a topic, usually a personal experience or news story, and stated their opinions on it. The series ended on February 28, 2011, as a result of half of the Chia Pet dying.

After the move to Los Angeles and the cancellation of their TV show, Commercial Kings, the duo launched Good Mythical Morning on January 9, 2012. The series took the same format as their previous show and added a "Wheel of Mythicality", containing suggestions from fans on how they would end the show, usually with a brief improvised scene.

Good Mythical Morning ran its first three seasons ending on April 5, 2013, as the duo took a break from the daily videos to start a new show with a weekly format, The Mythical Show. The series won the Best Variety Series at the International Academy of Web Television Awards in January 2013.

The fourth season of GMM introduced the "Taste Test" series where the hosts guess the food in blindfolds, challenge themselves to eat something or compare a particular type of food across different brands. Some of the most popular videos in GMM from this series are the "Bug War Challenge", the "Ghost Pepper Challenge", the "Carolina Reaper Challenge" and the "Sriracha Challenge". Season 5 of GMM brought in "Will It" series, where the hosts try and invent different varieties of a famous type of food with unusual and often increasing levels of disgusting ingredients. The first episode was aired on May 5, 2014, on Cinco De Mayo titled "Will it Taco" where they tried pine needles, baby shampoo and pork blood tacos. The series was also featured in The Tonight Show Starring Jimmy Fallon with episodes of "Will it Tea", "Will It S'more", "Will it Hummus", and "Will It Hot Dog".

McLaughlin (left) and Neal at VidCon in June 2014

After the end of The Mythical Show on July 11, 2013, the duo continued with the Good Mythical Morning series, now with an addition to the main GMM episode—Good Mythical More ("the show after the show") uploaded simultaneously to a separate channel in addition to their GMM channel. The 'Good Mythical More' episodes held on to their 'improvised on the spot' nature from earlier season of GMM while the main episodes became more and more structured. Season 6 of Good Mythical Morning premiered on July 14, 2014, with a new introduction sequence with animation by Digital Twigs and music by Pomplamoose. Several notable personalities, including PewDiePie, Mayim Bialik, Shay Mitchell, Bill Hader, Amy Schumer, and Daniel Radcliffe have been guests on the show.

The 1000th episode of Good Mythical Morning was uploaded on the morning of October 13, 2016 (4 years, 9 months, and 4 days after the first episode aired on January 9, 2012). The video was titled "1000th Episode Celebration Special" and has received 3.33 million views as of January 26, 2026. On October 19, the first episode of the YouTube Red original show Rhett & Link's Buddy System aired on the Good Mythical Morning channel. On July 23, 2021, the 2000th episode of Good Mythical Morning was uploaded, marking 9 years, 6 months and 14 days since the first episode aired on January 9, 2012, and 4 years, 9 months and 10 days since the premiere of the 1000th episode on October 13, 2016. The video was titled "2000th Episode Celebration Special" and has received over 1.9 million views as of January 26, 2026. Their 3000th episode, "3,000th Episode Celebration Special", released on March 13, 2026, was mostly focused on Chief Creative Officer Stevie Wynne Levine's departure from the show and company after thirteen years.

In October 2021, they debuted a spin-off of GMM titled Good Mythical Evening, a pay-per-view livestream event that was not available on YouTube. Rhett & Link described the show as a "decidedly R-rated spin on 'Good Mythical Morning' [...] featuring cursing, drinking, and adult situations galore." The first edition sold more than 70,000 tickets. The event was announced to be returning in September 2022, available on Moment House.

Beginning September 2026, new episodes of Good Mythical Morning, Mythical Kitchen and Last Meals, started simultaneously releasing on Netflix.

=== The Mythical Show ===
On April 25, 2013, Rhett & Link released the first episode of The Mythical Show on their second channel – a weekly 30-minute variety show on YouTube Thursdays at 5 pm (EST). Each episode contained a multitude of shorter videos starring Rhett & Link with other actors and YouTube personalities as guests, including Tony Hale, Jill Wagner, Kat Von D, Smosh, Grace Helbig, Shay Carl, the Fine Brothers, Tessa Violet, Hannah Hart, Paul Scheer, Key & Peele, Miranda Sings, and KassemG. The duo also published individual segments of The Mythical Show as standalone videos on their main channel.The Mythical Show ended on July 11, 2013, after 12 episodes.

They won the 2014 People's Choice Webby Award for individual comedy short or episode for their "Breaking Bad: The Middle School Musical" video that was a part of The Mythical Show's "Middle School Musicals" segments.

=== Mythical Kitchen ===
On December 20, 2019, their company, Mythical Entertainment, announced their new channel, Mythical Kitchen. The channel is a hub for all food featured videos, and it is run by the Mythical Chefs, Josh Scherer, Nicole Enayati, Trevor Evarts, Vianai "Vi" Austin, and Lily Burrola. It contains several series such as: "Fancy Fast Food", which takes famous fast food items to the next level and "Snack Smash", a food series that combines two snacks to create one creative concoction.

Launched January 11, 2021 the series “Last Meals” (LM) features Scherer doing long form interviews with celebrities over a meal that they would choose as their last on earth. In January 2024, LM released its collaboration with Gordon Ramsay, amassing over 20 million views on YouTube. In the same year, LM received the Webby Award for the Interview/Talk Show category, as well as the People's Voice award for the same category. In the spring of 2026, the show celebrated its 100th episode with Elijah Wood. The series continues to host a variety of celebrity guests, including Elizabeth Olsen, Hugh Jackman, Tom Hanks, and Noah Kahan.

=== Guest Appearances ===
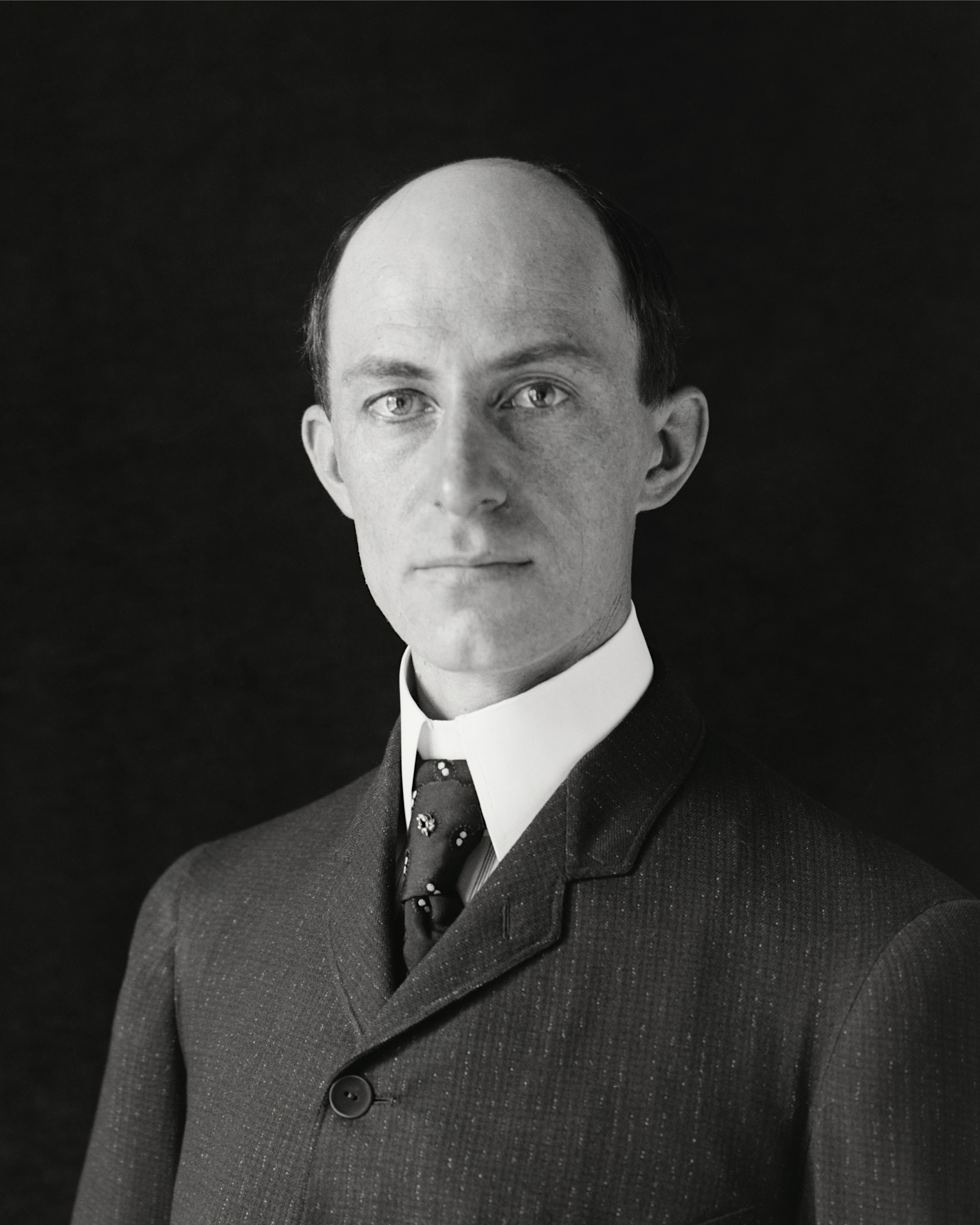
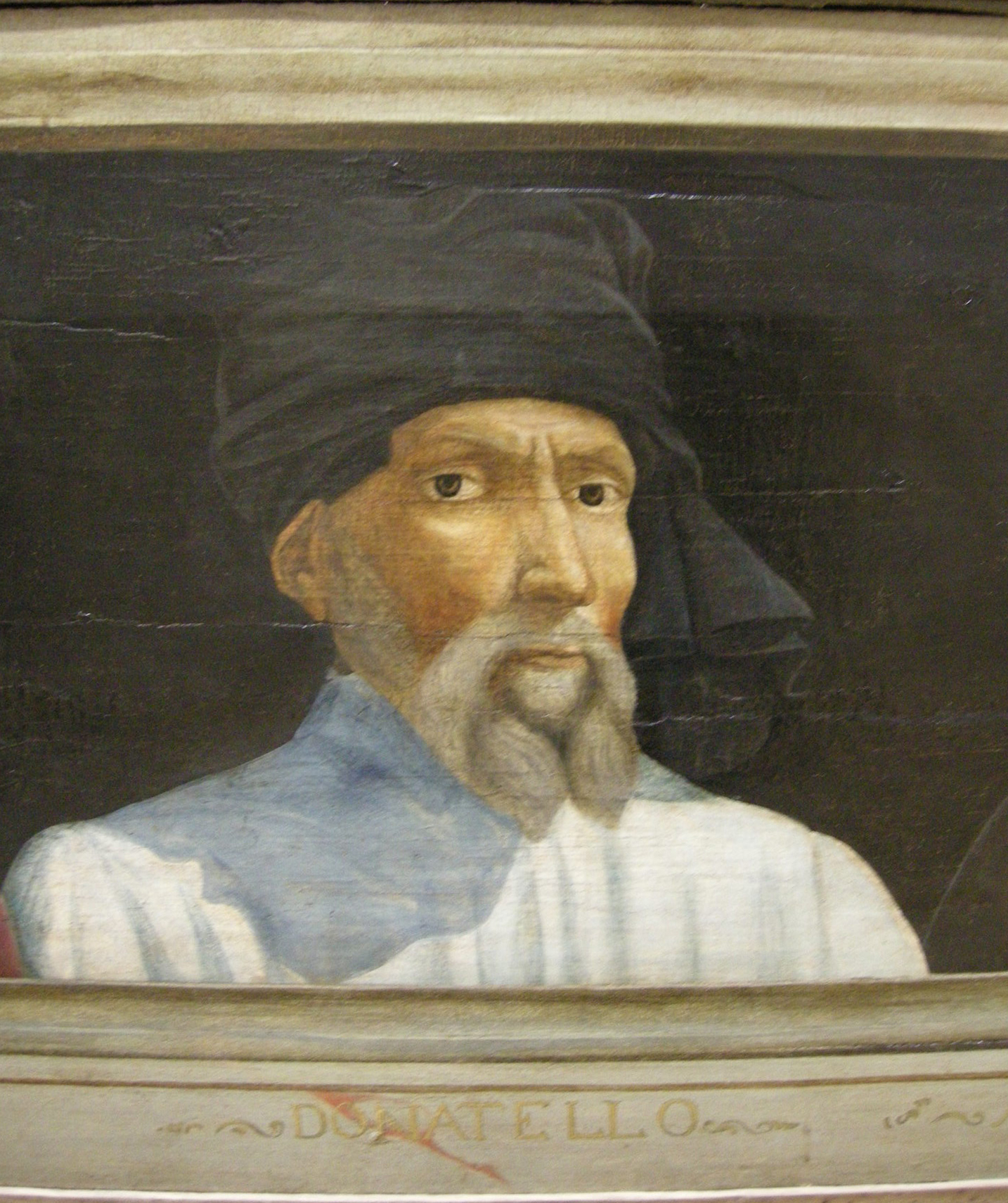
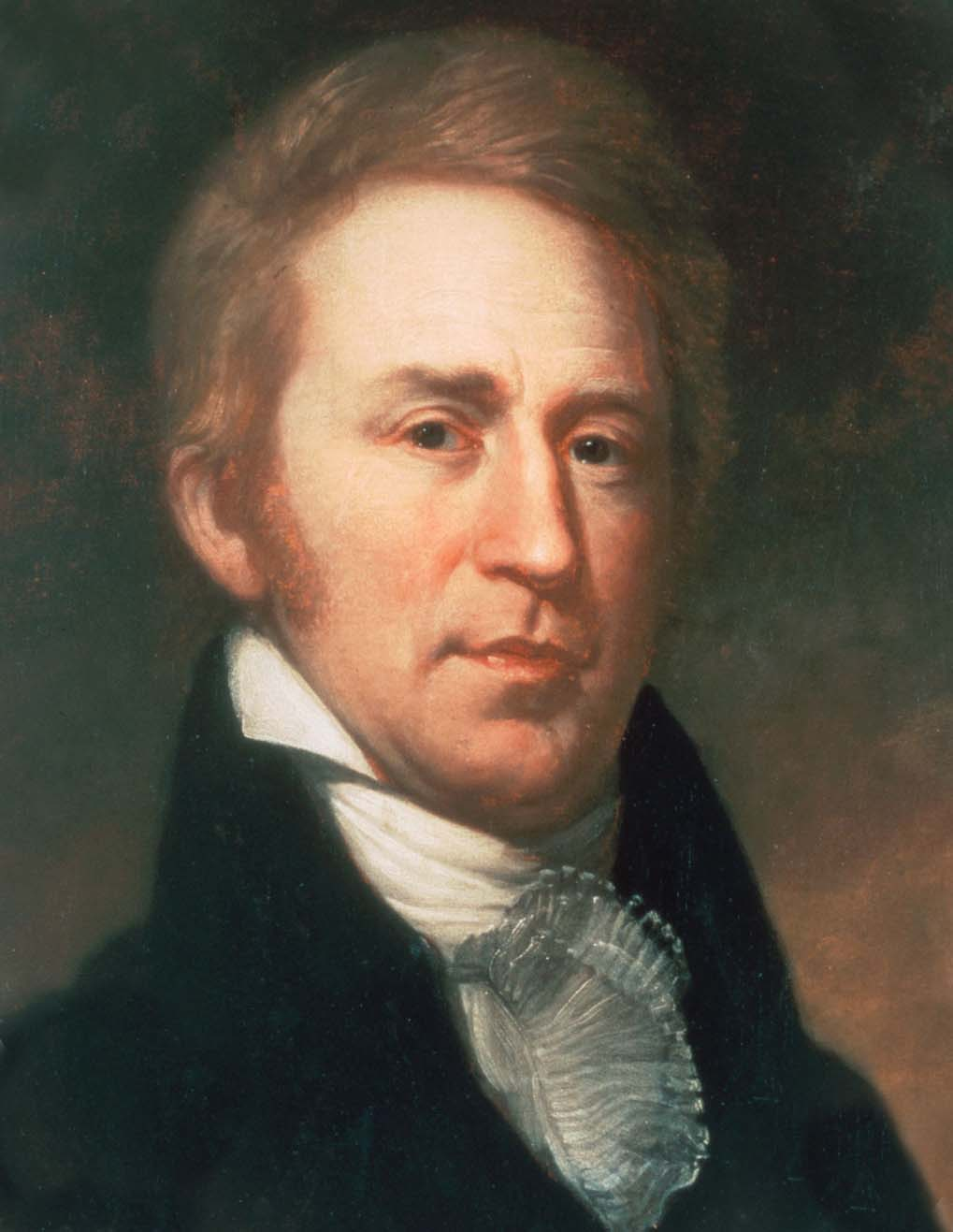
Rhett has portrayed and rapped as American aviator Wilbur Wright (left), Italian sculptor Donatello (center) and American explorer William Clark (right) for Epic Rap Battles of History.
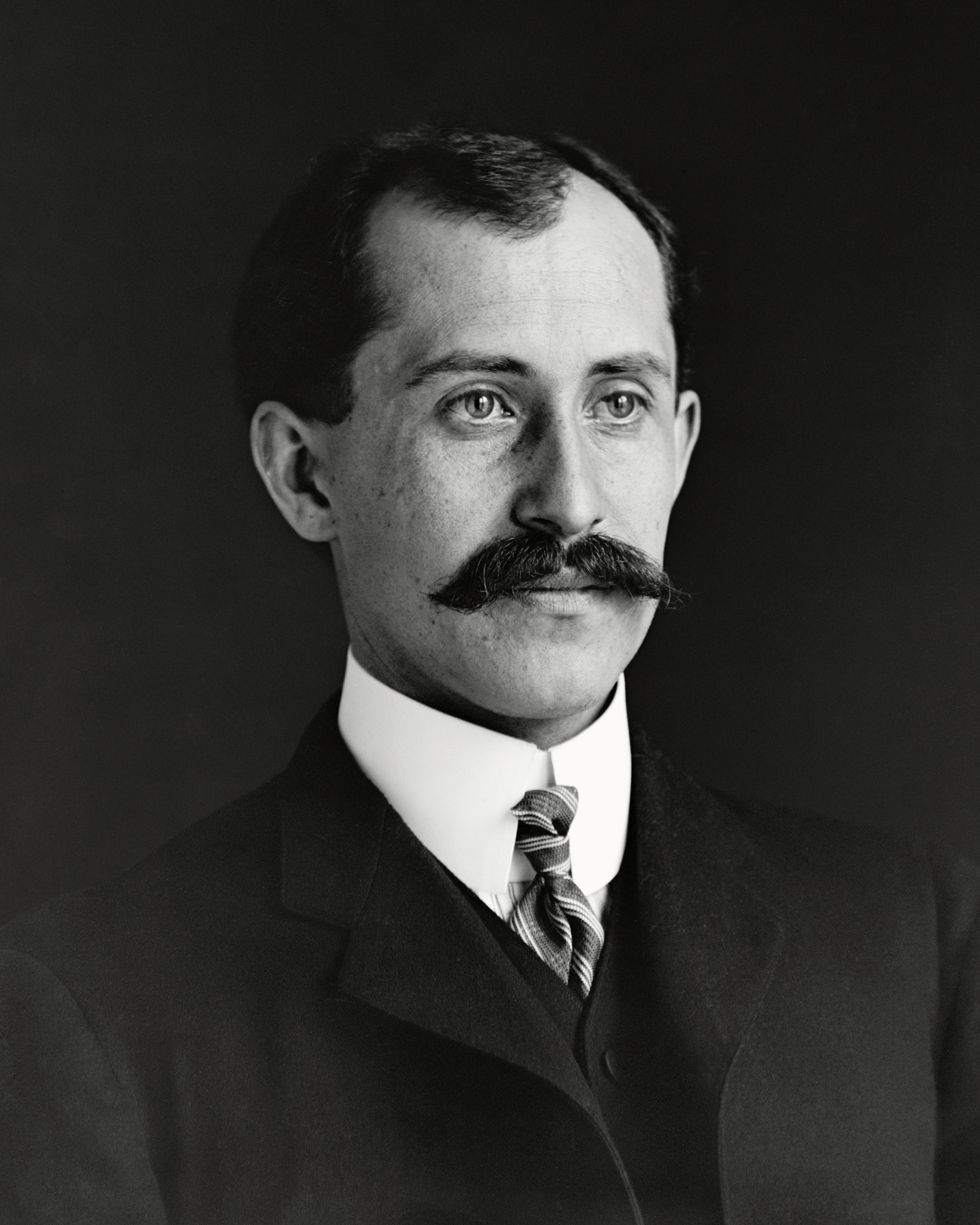
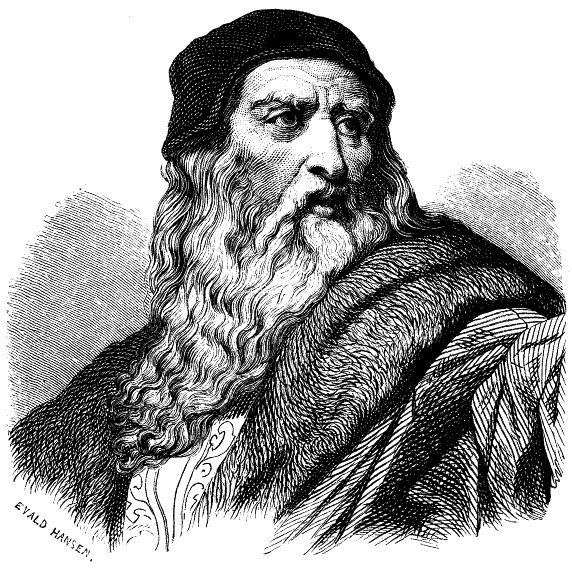
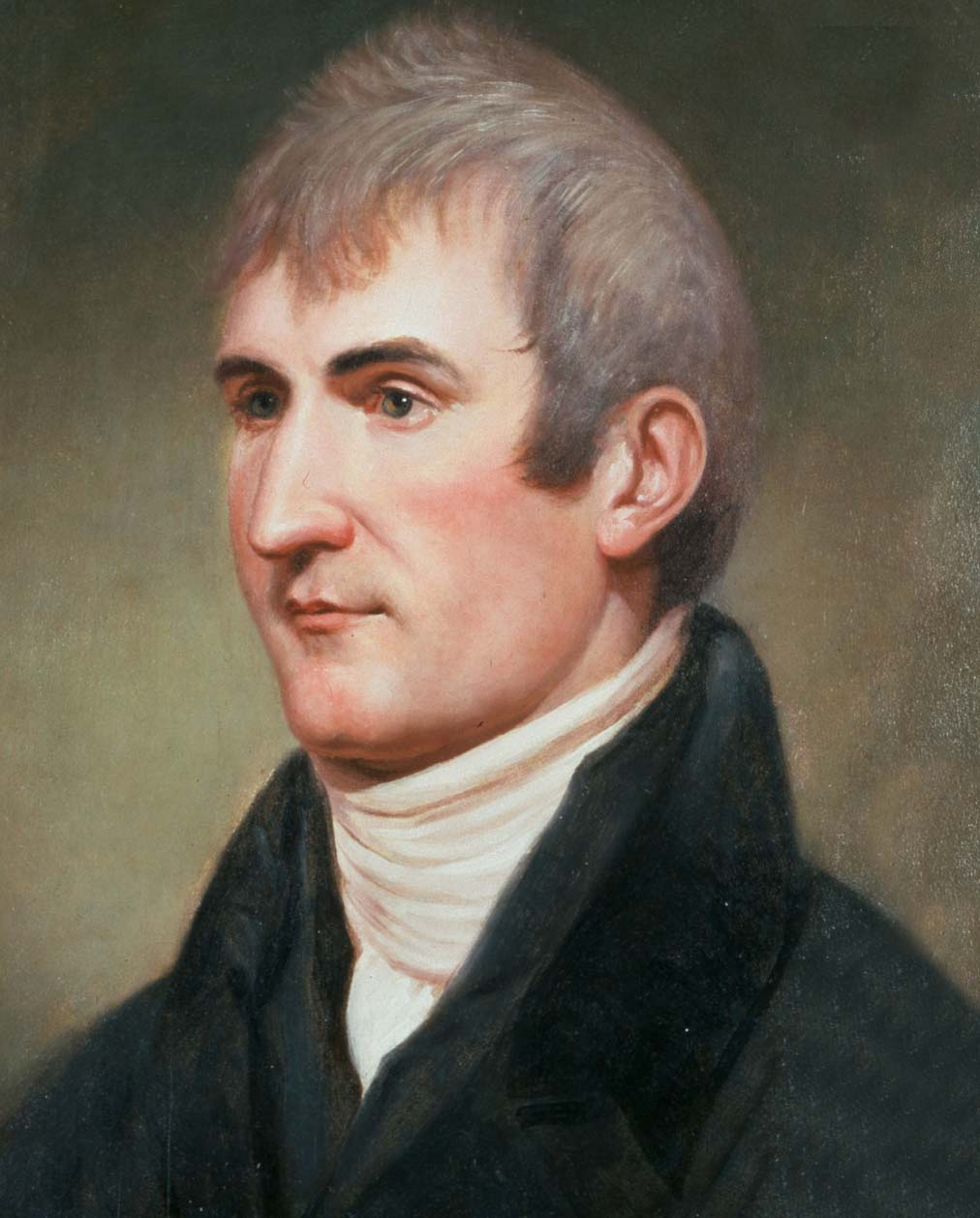
Link has portrayed and rapped as American aviator Orville Wright (left), Italian polymath Leonardo da Vinci (center) and American explorer Meriwether Lewis (right) for Epic Rap Battles of History.

YouTube Rewind videos have included Rhett & Link since 2012. Rewind YouTube Style 2012 featured the duo and the Dope Zebra (who was part of LMFAO music video for "Sorry for Party Rocking"), YouTube Rewind: What Does 2013 Say?, YouTube Rewind: Turn Down for 2014 and YouTube Rewind: Now Watch Me Rewind had them dancing in ridiculous manners. However, they weren't included in Rewind 2018.

Rhett & Link have been guests in three Epic Rap Battles of History. On February 16, 2012, the duo was featured in a Season 2 episode of the series, playing the Wright brothers, battling the Mario Brothers. On July 14, 2014, Rhett & Link, along with Smosh, appeared in the season 3 finale of the series, in which they played two of the four Renaissance artists battling against the Teenage Mutant Ninja Turtles. Neal played the role of Leonardo da Vinci and McLaughlin the role of Donatello. Their latest appearance was on May 25, 2015, opening Season 4.5 with the battle of Lewis and Clark vs. Bill and Ted. Neal played the role of Meriwether Lewis and McLaughlin the role of William Clark.

Rhett & Link have also appeared in several videos by the Fine Brothers for the YouTubers React series, as well as being the subject of one episode of the Kids React series.

=== Sponsored videos and web advertisements ===
Rhett & Link's first sponsored video, "Cornhole Song", was made for AJJ Cornhole in 2007, and since then the duo have integrated other small brands like Smule, with "I am a Thoughtful Guy" and iRESQ. Many larger companies have since sponsored the duo's videos including Alka-Seltzer, McDonald's, Wendy's and Cadillac among others.

In January 2008, they worked as web correspondents on the Sundance Film Festival for IGotShotgun.com in partnership with Cadillac. Summer of the same year they spent releasing videos for the Alka-Seltzer Great American Road Trip. The series won the Gold award in the Consumer Goods category at Advertising Age's 2008 W3 Awards, as well as best online campaign at Adweek's 2008 Buzz Awards. The series also picked up two Golds (Best Campaign, Best Single) and a Craft award (Music) at the 2009 Bessies and received two golds in the interactive category for Viral Marketing and Business to Consumer website at the 2009 Advertising & Design Club of Canada Awards.

Also in 2008, Rhett & Link released web series "Seaborne and Roach", sponsored by SpyAssociates.com, and "Surrogate Sharers" series advertising Starburst candy.

In 2009, the duo started to create free low-budget commercials for small local businesses throughout the U.S. in the web series "I Love Local Commercials", sponsored by Microbilt. At first they made 4 commercials for local businesses in their home state North Carolina – TDM Autosales, Bobby Denning Furniture, and Redhouse Furniture. These videos quickly went viral on YouTube, especially the Redhouse video, with its controversial jingle "Where Black People and White People Buy Furniture". The success of these commercials spurred Rhett & Link to continue creating commercials and for that they offered people across U.S. to nominate their favorite local businesses to take part in the web series. One such commercial was for Butt Drugs, a drugstore in Corydon, Indiana. The popularity of the duo's commercials garnered the attention of major advertising publications such as Advertising Age and AdWeek, and their commercials were featured on CNN, NPR, The New York Times, Forbes, and TMZ. A commercial for Cullman Liquidation Center won Best Local Commercial at the 2010 Ad Age Viral Video Awards. In 2010, Rhett & Link produced a commercial for Donut Prince, George Lopez's favorite donut place. Later they appeared in his show Lopez Tonight, where he called them "undisputed masters of bad local commercials".

The success of the web series led to Rhett & Link's television show, Rhett & Link: Commercial Kings on IFC. Every episode, Link's Epic Fail is featured, where Neal trips over a cement pyramid and scrapes up his hip and arm.

In 2009, Rhett & Link produced "Fast Food Folk Song" as a web commercial for Taco Bell, and in 2010 it won the Contest of Awesome for the Best Comic Music Video of 2009. The contest awarded them a trip to Los Angeles and a cameo in a Weezer music video.

In 2010, Rhett & Link created a stop motion video "T-shirt War" as a commercial for T-shirt printing company Rush T-shirts, in which they used 222 T-shirts with unique designs. The video already had 2 million views after only two weeks of being online, and quickly reached 4 million. "T-shirt War" also won in Best Online Promotion at the Apparel Industry category at the 2010 Spirit Awards. After the success of this commercial Rhett & Link received a call from McDonald's and Coca-Cola asking them to make a TV commercial with a T-shirt War theme. The commercial was also uploaded on YouTube, and this video, entitled "T-shirt War 2", reached 1 million views in two weeks.

Also in 2010, Rhett & Link released an online music video sponsored by SleepBetter.org – "2 Guys 600 pillows". Time listed the video as one of the Top-10 Talented Web Videos of 2010, and the video also won Best Editing category and Peoples' Voice Award at the 2011 Webby Awards. Rhett & Link continued working with SleepBetter.org, and in November 2012 they made another music video, "Sleep Tight".

In 2011, Rhett & Link made a commercial for Ojai Valley Taxidermy, owned by Chuck Testa, as part of their TV show, Rhett & Link: Commercial Kings. After the episode featuring the commercial aired, Chuck Testa uploaded the commercial to his company's YouTube channel. The ad went viral, topping 18 million views (as of December 2020) and spawning the "Nope! Chuck Testa" Internet meme. The Chuck Testa ad was included in Time's Top 10 Memes of 2011. Also in 2011, Rhett & Link released a music video entitled "PHOTOSHOP Song" which was sponsored by Canvas on Demand.

In September 2012, the duo released the video "Epic Rap Battle of Manliness" sponsored by Build.com.

In October 2013, Rhett & Link released a music video entitled "Epic Rap Battle: Nerd vs. Geek" which was sponsored by TigerDirect. They have made other rap battles, featured on their second channel, along with all their other music videos.

In December 2013, the duo released a music video in partnership with Buick's "In the Moment" campaign entitled "Get Off the Phone".

In May 2014, a new segment sponsored by Gillette was included on Good Mythical Morning for the week subscription campaign, as well as with the release of the "Kissing Your Face" video on the main channel.

In May 2015, the duo released a new music video, "Just Being Honest", sponsored by Wendy's new beverage "Honest Tea". As well as Sip Me Up, a streaming marketing campaign on June 18 where the duo created personalized content for the fans in real time.

On May 6, 2015, Rhett & Link teamed up with Hot Pockets and released the "Will It Hot Pocket?" episode in their popular "Will It" series on Good Mythical Morning where the Hot Pocket crust was replaced with odd items based on fan suggestions.

On June 5, 2015, a new segment on Good Mythical Morning was announced called "The Back Up Plan" sponsored by GEICO, where the duo explore different career opportunities. As of August 2016, there are 10 released episodes. Episodes have featured the duo trying the jobs of beekeeping, real estate sales, commercial cereal production, glassblowing, commercial flavor manufacturing, becoming potential "Marstronauts" at the Jet Propulsion Laboratories, aquatic animal keeping, ice sculpting, livestock auctioneering, and baking pies. The final segment served as both an episode of "The Back Up Plan" and an installment in their "Will It?" series. The segment subsequently ended within the season.

=== Podcasts ===
==== RhettandLinkast ====
In 2007, Rhett & Link created the RhettandLinkast for iTunes. Originally filmed in a backroom at Cru, the two soon relocated to a spare property belonging to McLaughlin's father-in-law in Lillington, North Carolina.

==== Ear Biscuits ====
On September 27, 2013, Rhett & Link launched an audio podcast on iTunes, Spotify, and SoundCloud called Ear Biscuits, which airs every Sunday. The podcast debuted in the US on the iTunes charts at No. 22. and it is described as intimate discussions with each other such as how they became blood brothers, their close encounters with death, and more. They also interview other notable Internet personalities and celebrities such as Grace Helbig, Julian Smith, Philip DeFranco, PewDiePie and Rainn Wilson. They've had live recordings on VidCon as well as Rhett-and-Link-only episodes each month.

As of July 2015, the podcast was number No. 14 on the iTunes US Comedy Charts. The podcast has won them a Shorty Award for Best Podcast in April 2016.

On March 27, 2017, the podcast returned from a hiatus with a new video format on their latest channel, This Is Mythical, and had moved to the Good Mythical Morning channel. The podcast continued to be released on iTunes and SoundCloud, as well as Spotify.

On January 7, 2019, the podcast was moved from the Good Mythical Morning channel to its own separate channel.

In October 2025, the duo announced they would be taking an indefinite hiatus from Ear Biscuits at the end of the year. The decision was made to mitigate stress and focus on other projects, citing McLaughlin's recent health scare as a major factor.

==== Ronstadt ====
On May 13, 2021, Rhett & Link announced they would be co-producing and starring in a scripted podcast titled Ronstadt, set to release on June 1. McLaughlin portrays the eponymous character, a 9-1-1 call center responder who handles supernatural cases. The podcast consisted of 9 episodes aired in June and July 2021.

== Music ==
=== As a duo ===
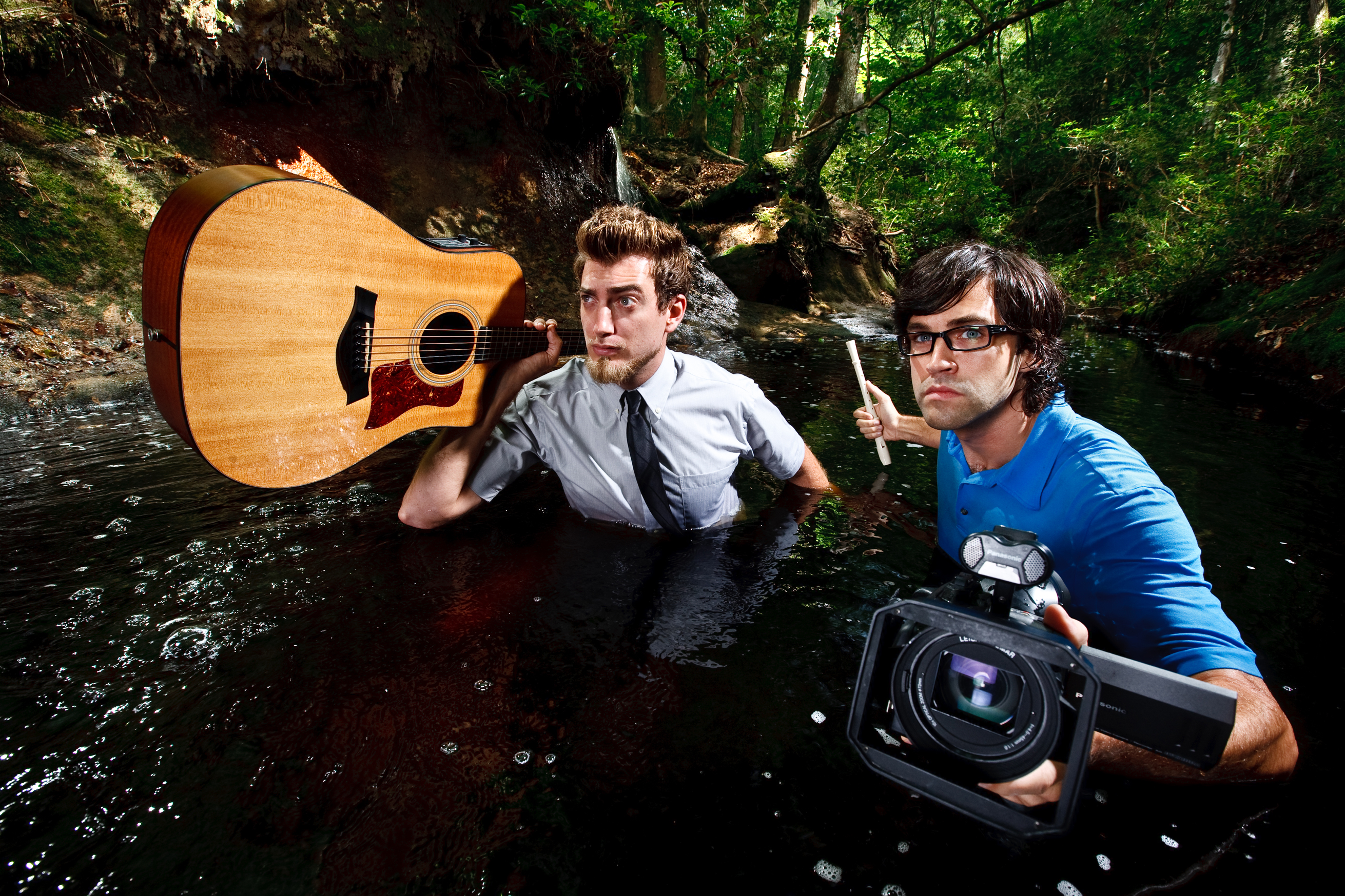
McLaughlin (left) and Neal (right) posing for their "Up to This Point" album cover

McLaughlin plays guitar and Neal plays the recorder, pan flute, and harmonica; they both sing. Rhett & Link perform live musical comedy and have completed two albums. In 2001, Rhett & Link independently released Just Mail Us the Grammy, featuring the popular song "The Unibrow Song". In 2005, Rhett & Link independently released I'm Sorry, What Was That? (Live in the Living Room), a live album featuring "The Wal-Mart Song". The album is available at the iTunes Store. In April 2007, Rhett & Link placed 3rd in the TurboTax TaxRap Contest, a contest judged by Vanilla Ice. In 2008, Rhett & Link independently released Websongs Vol 1, an online album featuring "Facebook Song", "Cornhole Song" and "Velcro Song". On February 1, 2009, Rhett & Link independently released Secret Songs, a collection of songs that were previously only available to winners of their monthly "Community Building Exercises", a part of their "Quest for the Seven Keys" contest.

On December 4, 2009, Rhett & Link teamed up with DFTBA Records and created a new album called Up To This Point.

On October 4, 2013, Rhett & Link released "Epic Rap Battle: Nerd vs. Geek" which gained 50 million views on YouTube and triggered several internet memes. The video followed a nerd and a geek in TigerDirect rapping to see who is better. After the video was released, their second channel, Good Mythical Morning, released the video "NERD vs GEEK: How to Tell the Difference", which was explaining differences between nerds and geeks.

In May 2015, Rhett & Link released a new album with the songs from their series, "Song Biscuits", which involved them writing a song with a guest (or just themselves) within an hour and performing it. This album is entitled Song Biscuits: Volume 1 and is available on iTunes.

To correspond with their YouTube Red show, Rhett & Link's Buddy System, the duo released the album Buddy System (Music From Season 1) which includes seven songs, one from each episode. It was released a week before the premiere date in October 2016 and is available on Google Play Music and iTunes.

=== James and the Shame ===
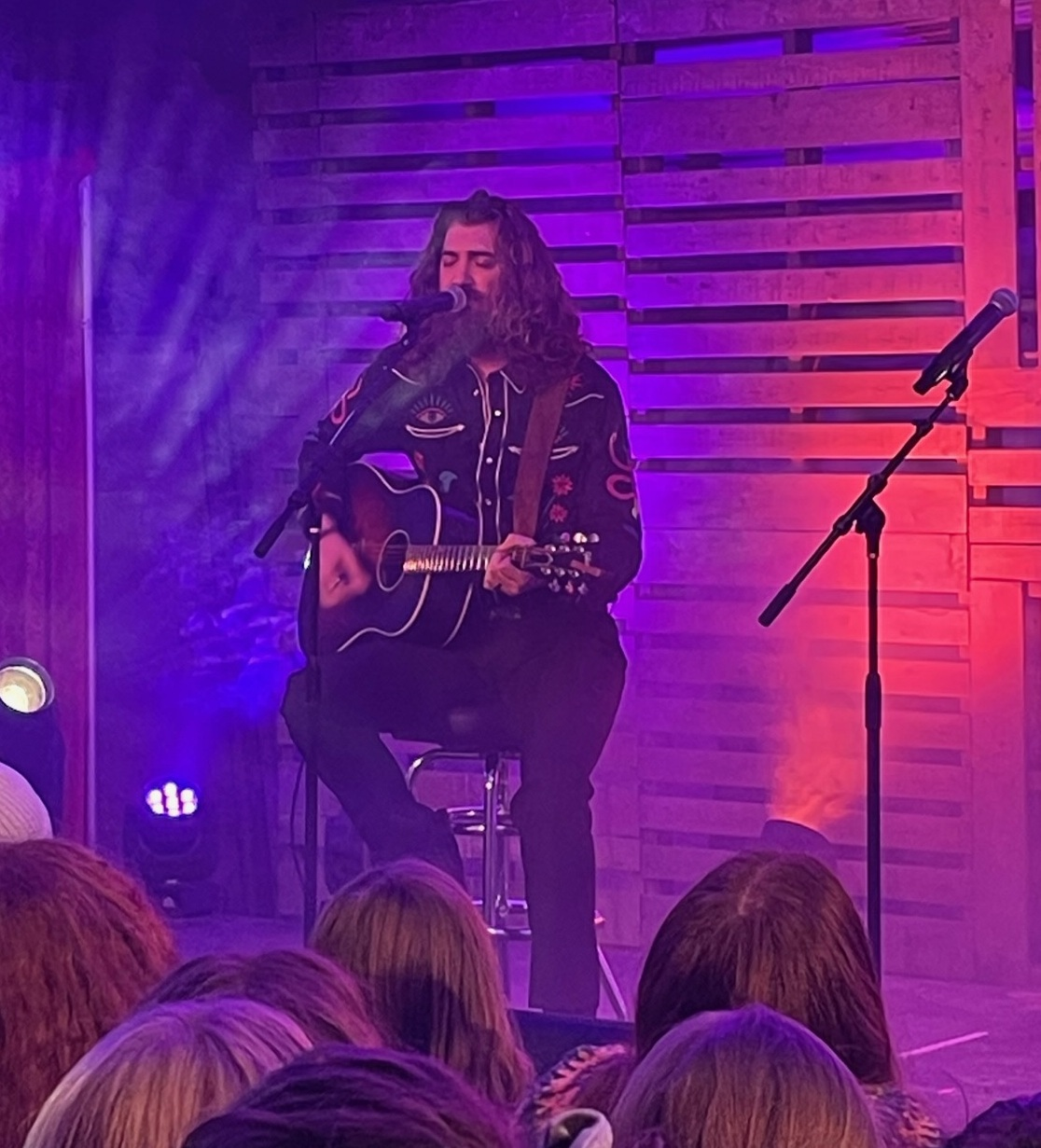
McLaughlin performing as James and the Shame at Mythicon in 2022

In July 2022, McLaughlin released a single titled "Believe Me" under the name "James and the Shame." McLaughlin announced he would be releasing a full album titled Human Overboard. On August 19, a second single titled "Where We're Going" was released, with the music video being released a day earlier. The song is a duet with his wife Jessie. The full album was released on September 23, 2022. The album was recorded at Finn-land Studios in Burbank, California with Derek Furhmann producing. The album is a country music album, with McLaughlin citing Jason Isbell, Tyler Childers and Sturgill Simpson as sources of inspiration.

McLaughlin performed live at his and Neal's 2022 fan convention, Mythicon. A follow up EP, titled Nothing Left to Love, was released on November 3, 2023.

== Film and television ==
In 2006, Rhett & Link began work on a documentary about their search for their first grade teacher, Ms. Locklear, entitled Looking for Ms. Locklear. The film released in 2008 and won the Southern Lens Award from South Carolina Public TV, which led to the film screening on PBS in South Carolina. The film also won audience choice awards at the ACE Film Festival and the Secret City Film Festival, and won 2nd place documentary at the Secret City Film Festival. The documentary was an official selection at the Real to Reel Film Festival, the Landlocked Film Festival, the Hot Springs Documentary Film Festival, BendFilm Festival, Asheville Film Festival, and the Cucalorus Film Festival. On September 9, 2009, the duo released the movie on DVD, distributing it over the Internet.

Rhett & Link were among the first group of Internet personalities who attempted transitions from the Internet into network television. In 2007, along with Stevie Ryan and Joy Leslie, Rhett & Link hosted the short-lived series Online Nation, a show that featured the best viral videos from the Internet, part of the 2007 fall lineup on the CW Network. The premiere episode was seen by 1 million people, but the show was cancelled after only four episodes. As the hosts, Rhett & Link responded with an Internet video.

Rhett & Link starred in the IFC original series, Rhett & Link: Commercial Kings. The show chronicled the quest of Rhett & Link as they traveled the country making local commercials for small businesses. Having premiered Friday, June 24, 2011, at 10:00pm ET/PT on IFC, this ten-part docu-comedy is based on their successful web series I Love Local Commercials and features Rhett & Link helping local businesses achieve their goals by creating eye-catching local commercials using local talent. The show was, however, canceled.

Rhett & Link served as musical correspondents for Brink, hosted by Josh Zepps, on the Science Channel. They wrote and produced three music videos including "My Robot Girlfriend", "Space Junk", and "The S.E.T.I. Song".

They appeared as guests on Lopez Tonight where they were interviewed, made a commercial for George's favorite doughnut place, and were back-up dancers for the remainder of the show after their interview. They have also appeared on Last Call with Carson Daly and Conan. Rhett & Link performed on season 7 of America's Got Talent as a novelty act, being eliminated in the first round. As of August 2018, the duo have also appeared five times on The Tonight Show Starring Jimmy Fallon.

Rhett & Link also produced segments for Phil Vischer's "What's in the Bible". In that, they were a singing duo named "The Fabulous Bentley Brothers" performing teaching songs about different books, or topics, in the Bible.

Rhett & Link appeared on the WWE Network original series Legends House, judging the WWE Legends' custom commercials, replacing Adam West.

Rhett & Link appeared in the edutainment web series Wonder Quest, and guest starred in 2 episodes as Thomas Edison (McLaughlin) and William Hammer (Neal). Most recently, Rhett & Link created, wrote, produced, and starred in their show, Rhett & Link's Buddy System, which was released on YouTube Red (now known as YouTube Premium). Buddy System was featured in Variety as the most talked about digital show, beating out Netflix's Orange Is the New Black and Amazon's The Man in the High Castle.

In January 2022, it was announced that Rhett & Link would star in a show on Food Network titled The Taste Buds. The show was renamed Inside Eats with Rhett & Link before its premiere on April 24. The show ran for four episodes.

=== Rhett & Link's Wonderhole ===
In August 2024, Rhett & Link's Wonderhole premiered on the original Rhett & Link channel, a show independently financed and distributed by Mythical Entertainment. While still being released on YouTube, the show acted as a departure from their traditional content, opting for a more experimental and ambitious tone. In 2025, the show was renewed for a second season.

=== Looking for Ms. Locklear ===
Looking for Ms. Locklear poster

Looking for Ms. Locklear is a 2008 American documentary film written, produced, composed, edited, and directed by Rhett & Link. The film follows Rhett & Link as they search for the whereabouts of their first grade teacher, Lenora Locklear. The film was shot in parts of Buies Creek, North Carolina and Washington, D.C. The film was released online through RhettandLinKreations on July 23, 2008. The film was additionally screened by the Southern Culture Movie Series in 2016.

The premise was:

Using only word of mouth, two lifelong best friends and Internet comedians, Rhett & Link, embark on a search for the long-lost teacher of the first grade class where they met. Their journey leads them deep into the heart of an obscure tribe of Native Americans, the Lumbee of North Carolina. Serendipitously, Rhett & Link arrive on the scene at the very climax of the tribe's century-long political struggle for identity. In a day of mobile devices that allow for a multitude of superficial connections with other 'users,' the unforgettable characters in Looking for Ms. Locklear serve as a reminder that people have more to say than an email or text message can communicate.

— Rhett McLaughlin

== Discography ==
- I'm Sorry, What Was That? (Live In the Living Room)
- Websongs, Vol.1
- Up To This Point
- Song Biscuits, Vol. 1
- Rhett & Link's Buddy System (Music from Season 1)
- Rhett & Link's Buddy System (Music from Season 2)
- Tour of Mythicality (Live from Los Angeles)

== Books ==
=== Book of Mythicality ===
Rhett & Link unveiled their book, to be published by Crown Archetype, Rhett & Link's Book of Mythicality: A Field Guide to Curiosity, Creativity and Tomfoolery on February 13, 2017. It was also made available for pre-order from several major online retailers on the same day. The front cover was shown for the first time during an interview with the duo on The Tonight Show Starring Jimmy Fallon on March 24, 2017. Rhett & Link have described the book as "a hilarious blend of autobiography, trivia and advice" and will include the story behind their friendship and career, as well as tips on how to "add Mythicality" to the reader's life, supported by anecdotes from their own past. The book was officially released on October 10, 2017, and then made it onto The New York Times Best Seller list in the "Advice, How-To and Miscellaneous" section for the week ending October 14, 2017.

=== The Lost Causes of Bleak Creek ===
The Lost Causes of Bleak Creek was published on October 29, 2019. It is a thriller novel co-written by Rhett & Link and Lance Rubin, largely based on McLaughlin and Neal's experiences in their home town of Buies Creek, North Carolina. The book reached No. 13 on the New York Times Best Sellers list.

=== Spaghetti Head & Chicken Fingers ===
Spaghetti Head & Chicken Fingers is a children's picture book by McLaughlin and Neal and illustrated by Erica Salcedo. The book was released in June 2026 and marks the duo's first picture book for young readers.

== Tours ==
It was announced on May 16, 2017, that Rhett & Link would be going on tour around the United States in order to promote their upcoming book, performing at 16 theatres around the country. The demand was so high that second shows were added to five of the theatres, bringing the total number of shows up to 21. A further two early shows were added to theatres in New York and Los Angeles on August 12, leaving the final total number of shows at 23. Every theatre sold every ticket for all of these shows.

In 2018, Rhett & Link performed three shows in Australia, in Melbourne, Sydney, and Brisbane on July 27, 29, and 30 respectively.

Additionally, following the announcement of their Australian tour dates, the duo announced three further North American shows: Toronto, Atlantic City and Mashantucket on November 8, 9 and 10 respectively. The November 10 show was the final show of the Tour of Mythicality. In February 2019, Rhett & Link held a concert in London as part of VidCon London. They had a number of other concerts in spring, summer, and fall 2019 under the title Rhett & Link Live.

In the summer of 2024, Rhett & Link went on the Good Mythical Tour.

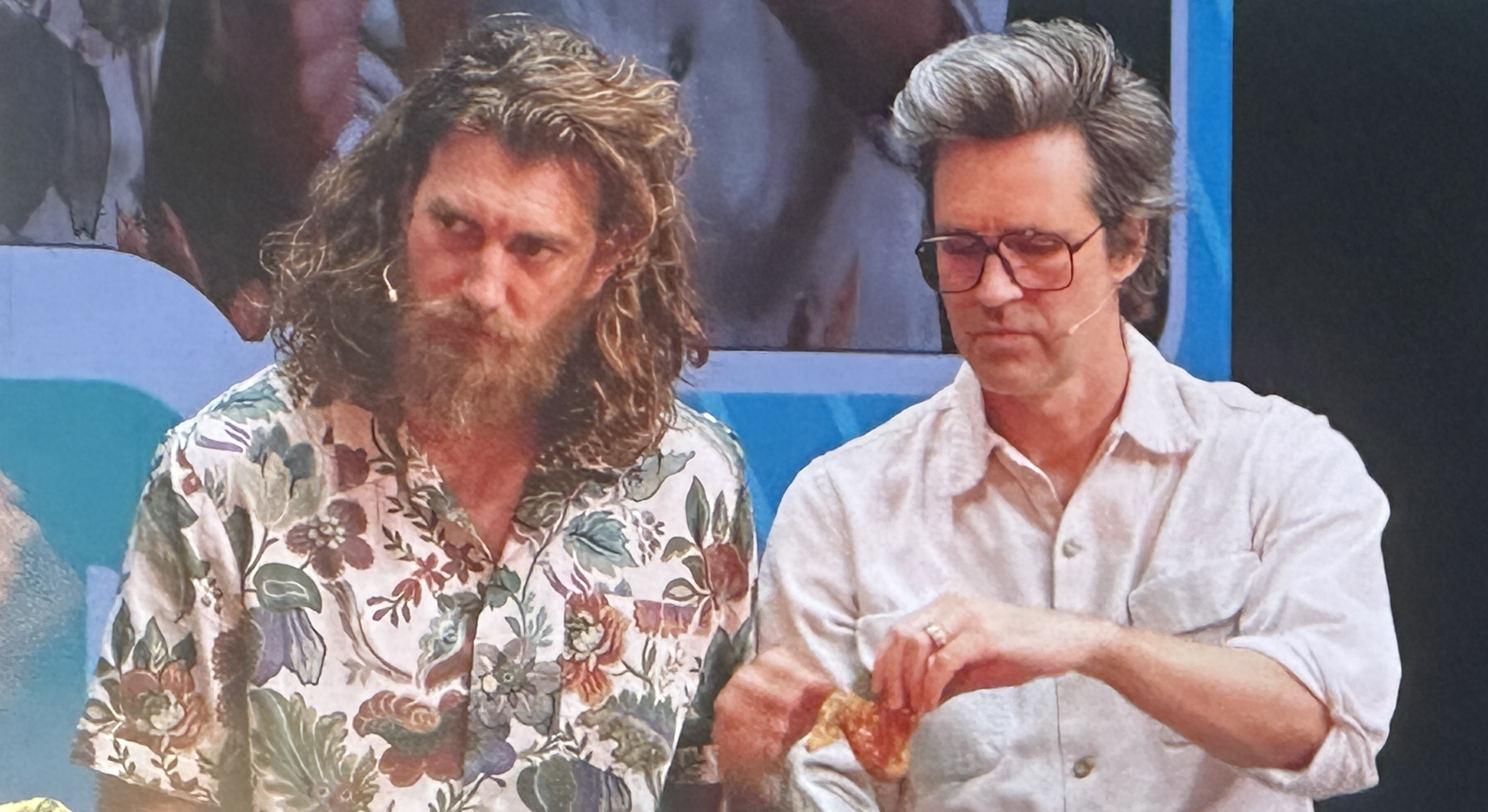
Rhett & Link while on tour at a stop in Washington D.C.

== Mythical Entertainment ==
Mythical Entertainment, LLC
- Formerly: Rhett & Link, Inc.
- Type: Private
- Industry: Entertainment
- Founded: 2009; 17 years ago
- Founders: Rhett McLaughlin; Link Neal
- Headquarters: Burbank, California
- Key people: Brian Flanagan (president); Jacob Moncrief (Chief Operations Officer); Neel Yalamarthy (vice president)
- Subsidiaries: Smosh (2019–2023)
- Website: mythical.com

Rhett & Link founded "Rhett & Link, Inc." in 2009. The name was changed to Mythical Entertainment, LLC in 2017. Mythical Entertainment, LLC is managed by Mythical Holdings, LLC which itself is managed by Lillington Basement, Inc. Mythical Entertainment produces the online videos, television shows, podcasts, books, recorded music, and live tours, as well as the related merchandise sold through their store and on Amazon.

On February 22, 2019, it was announced that Mythical Entertainment had acquired the Smosh brand (Smosh, Smosh Games, Smosh Pit, and others) after the channel's former parent company, Defy Media, had gone into liquidation. Ian Hecox, the co-founder of Smosh, explained that under the Mythical Entertainment banner, the channel would have full creative freedom and launch its own podcast, known as the SmoshCast. In July 2021, Rhett & Link announced the launch of the "Mythical Accelerator Fund", five million dollars they plan to use to continue to acquire ownership stakes in other social media stars’ businesses. The first investment made with the fund was a minority stake in content creator Jarvis Johnson's company. The second investment made with the fund was in musician Daniel Thrasher's channel in April 2022.

Starting on March 14, 2023, Rhett & Link launched "Mythical 24/7", a streaming television channel on Roku. The channel included episodes of Good Mythical Morning, Good Mythical More, Mythical Kitchen, and Ear Biscuits, among other Mythical productions.

In June 2023, Hecox and Anthony Padilla jointly repurchased a majority stake in Smosh from Mythical Entertainment, with Mythical retaining a minority stake.

In August 2023, the third investment made with the Accelerator Fund was in The Sorry Girls.

In December 2024, Mythical Entertainment was part of the investment group that purchased First We Feast, the company behind the YouTube talk show Hot Ones from BuzzFeed. The group also included Sean Evans, Chris Schonberger, Crooked Media, and Soros Fund Management.

In March 2026, Stevie Wynne Levine, Chief Creative Officer, announced her departure after thirteen years.

=== Productions ===
Title	Release	Status	Type	Notes
Good Morning Chia Lincoln	January 3, 2011 – February 28, 2011	Finished	Web series	41 episodes
Commercial Kings	June 24, 2011 – August 26, 2011	Finished	Television series	10 episodes
Good Mythical Morning	January 9, 2012 – present	Ongoing	Web series	3000 episodes
The Mythical Show	April 25, 2013 – July 11, 2013	Finished	Web series	12 episodes
Ear Biscuits	September 27, 2013 – present	On Hiatus	Podcast	450+ episodes
Good Mythical More	January 8, 2014 – present	Ongoing	Web series	1100+ episodes
The Hey Hey Show	November 18, 2014 – July 10, 2015	Finished	Web series	124 episodes
Rhett & Link's Buddy System	October 19, 2016 – November 29, 2017	Finished	YouTube Red series	2 seasons, 16 episodes
Let's Talk About That	August 25, 2018 – December 21, 2019	Finished	Web series	54 episodes
Smosh	February 22, 2019 – June 2023	Sold	YouTube channel	Sold June 2023, maintain minority stake
Rhett & Link Vlogs	January 18, 2020 - January 16, 2021	Finished	Web Series	18 episodes
A Hot Dog Is a Sandwich	March 4, 2020 – present	Ongoing	Podcast	90+ episodes
Ronstadt	June 1, 2021 – July 20, 2021	Finished	Podcast	1 season completed
Trevor Talks Too Much	February 1, 2022 – December 13, 2022	Finished	Podcast	45 episodes
Best Friends Back, Alright	March 7, 2022 – December 16, 2022	Finished	Podcast	34 episodes
Inside Eats with Rhett & Link	April 24, 2022 – May 15, 2022	Finished	Television series	4 episodes
Rhett & Link's Wonderhole	August 23, 2024 – present	Ongoing	Web series	9 episodes

== Awards and nominations ==
In 2009, Rhett & Link were named No. 22 on Business Insider's Top 25 Most Creative People in Advertising List. In September of the same year, they joined the Collective, a media company in Los Angeles.

In 2014, the Rhett & Link YouTube Channel was listed on New Media Rockstars Top 100 Channels, ranked at No. 35.

Year	Title	Nominated	Award	Result
2011	Webby Awards	2 Guys, 600 Pillows (Backwards Music Video)	Best Editing	Won
2013	Webby Awards	Rhett & Link	Online Film & Video – Variety Channel	Honoree
2013	IAWTV Awards	Good Mythical Morning	Best Variety Series	Won
2013	LA Web Awards	Shift It	Funniest YouTube Video	Won
2014	Streamy Awards	Good Mythical Morning	Science and Education	Nominated
2014	Webby Awards	Rhett & Link	First Person	Honoree
2014	Webby Awards	Breaking Bad: The Middle School Musical	Comedy Individual Short or Episode – People's Voice	Won
2014	Webby Awards	Shift It, Shift It	Viral	Honoree
2015	Webby Awards	Epic Rap Battle: Nerd vs. Geek	Viral (Branded) – People's Voice	Won
2015	Webby Awards	Good Mythical Morning	Variety (Channel) – People's Voice	Won
2015	Webby Awards	Good Mythical Morning	First Person – People's Voice	Won
2015	Streamy Awards	Rhett & Link	Comedy	Nominated
2015	Streamy Awards	Good Mythical Morning	Non-fiction	Won
2015	Streamy Awards	Good Mythical Morning	Show of the Year	Nominated
2016	Shorty Awards	Ear Biscuits	Best Podcast	Won
2016	Shorty Awards	Good Mythical Morning	Best Web Series	Won
2016	Webby Awards	Good Mythical Morning	Best Web Personality (Channel)-People's Voice	Won
2016	Webby Awards	Good Mythical Morning	Online Film & Video – Variety (Channel)	Honoree
2016	Webby Awards	BFFs	Comedy: Individual Short or Episode	Honoree
2016	Webby Awards	The Backup Plan – Rhett & Link for Geico	Series	Honoree
2016	Streamy Awards	Good Mythical Morning	Comedy	Won
2016	Streamy Awards	Good Mythical Morning	Best Writing (Note: Nominees: Drew Champion, Edward Coleman, Lizzie Bassett, Kevin Kostelnik, Daniela Hamilton, Chase Hilt)	Nominated
2016	Streamy Awards	Good Mythical Morning	Show of the Year	Nominated
2016	Reality TV Awards	Good Mythical Morning	Digital Reality Series	Nominated
2017	Webby Awards	Good Mythical Morning	Web Personality (Channels and Networks)	Nominated
2017	Webby Awards	Good Mythical Morning	Best Web Personality/Host	Honoree
2017	Make-A-Wish	Rhett & Link	Chris Greicius Celebrity Award	Won
2018	Shorty Awards	Rhett & Link	Creator of the Decade	Nominated
2018	Shorty Awards	Rhett & Link's Buddy System	Best Web Series	Nominated
2018	Webby Awards	Good Mythical Morning	Best Web Personality/Host (Film & Video)	Nominated
2018	Streamy Awards	Good Mythical Morning	Show of the Year	Nominated
2018	Streamy Awards	Rhett & Link's Buddy System	Comedy Series	Nominated
2018	Streamy Awards	Ear Biscuits	Podcast	Nominated
2019	Shorty Awards	Good Mythical Morning	Best Web Series	Nominated
2019	Webby Awards	Ear Biscuits	Best Host (Podcasts) – People's Voice	Won
2019	Streamy Awards	Food Fears	Food	Nominated
2019	Streamy Awards	Good Mythical Morning	Show of the Year	Won
2020	Webby Awards	Good Mythical Morning	Variety (Series & Channels)	Honoree
2020	Webby Awards	Ear Biscuits	Comedy (Podcasts)	Honoree
2020	Streamy Awards	Good Mythical Morning	Show of the Year	Nominated
2021	Webby Awards	Good Mythical Morning	Variety (Series & Channels) - People's Voice	Won
2021	Webby Awards	Ear Biscuits	Comedy (Podcasts)	Honoree
2022	Webby Awards	Good Mythical Morning	Best Creator, Personality or Host - People's Voice	Won
2022	Webby Awards	Mythical Kitchen	Food & Drink (Series & Channels) - People's Voice	Won
2022	Streamy Awards	Good Mythical	Show Of The Year	Won
2023	Webby Awards	Good Mythical Morning	Variety (Series & Channels)	Honoree
2023	Webby Awards	Ear Biscuits	Best Co-Hosts (Podcasts)	Honoree
2023	Streamy Awards	Good Mythical Morning	Show Of The Year	Nominated
2024	Webby Awards	Good Mythical Morning	Variety (Series & Channels)	Honoree
2024	Webby Awards	Last Meals	Interview or Talk Show	Won
2024	Webby Awards	Mythical Kitchen	Food & Drink (Series & Channels) - People's Voice	Won
2025	Webby Awards	Good Mythical Morning	Variety (Series & Channels) - People's Voice	Won
2025	Webby Awards	Good Mythical Morning	Best Creator, Personality or Host	Won
2025	Webby Awards	Wonderhole	Video & Film, Comedy - People's Voice	Won
2025	Telly Awards	Good Mythical Morning	Game Show & Competition	Won
2025	Telly Awards	Last Meals	Interview & Talk Show	Won

== Personal lives ==
McLaughlin and Neal currently live in La Crescenta-Montrose, California, where they run a Burbank-based production company named Mythical Entertainment. McLaughlin and his wife, Jessie, have two sons. Neal and his wife, Christy, have two sons and a daughter.

McLaughlin and Neal were both raised as Christians and previously worked as full-time missionaries while attending college. In 2020, both described their changes in faith in separate episodes of their podcast Ear Biscuits. Both said they are no longer evangelical Christians, with McLaughlin saying he would call himself "a hopeful agnostic" and Neal saying he would call himself "an agnostic who wants to be hopeful".

In an October 2025 episode of Ear Biscuits, McLaughlin revealed he had recently undergone a heart ablation procedure (specifically, pulse field ablation) to correct atrial flutter and atrial fibrillation. Citing the health scare as an impetus to explore creative passions with less stress, he simultaneously announced the launch of his solo YouTube channel, @RhettMcLaughlin, which focuses on his personal interests and video essays.
