= Chuck Testa =

American taxidermist and internet meme

- Born: Charles A. Testa; 1956 (age 69–70); Ojai Valley, California, U. S.
- Occupation: Taxidermist

Charles A. Testa (born 1956) is an American taxidermist and owner of Ojai Valley Taxidermy in California. A commercial for Testa's business created by American comedy duo Rhett & Link for their shortlived TV show Rhett & Link: Commercial Kings in 2011 became a viral video, and the catchphrase "Nope, Chuck Testa" became an Internet meme.

== Life and career ==
Testa was born and raised in the Ojai Valley. He managed his father's Baskin-Robbins store in Venice Beach, California before he began preserving wildlife through taxidermy.

=== Commercial and response ===
In summer 2011, Testa's future son-in-law posted a commercial for Testa's business on YouTube. The video was originally created by Rhett & Link for the show Rhett & Link: Commercial Kings on IFC. The commercial asserts that Testa's work is so realistic that people will assume the animals are still alive. It depicts people reacting to what they believe are live animals in unusual situations, e.g., "Look at that antelope driving a car!", only to have Testa appear and declare, "Nope, it's just Chuck Testa." The phrase became popular on websites such as Reddit and Tumblr, spurring mainstream media coverage, including Fox News and CBS. The video was also ranked as the #10 best meme of 2011 by Time magazine's Nick Carbone.

In October 2026, Testa appeared as a cameo in Mozilla's Come Back to Firefox advertising campaign, alongside several other viral internet personalities from the 2000s and 2010s. The campaign used nostalgia for early internet culture to promote Firefox.

== Television appearances ==
In 2012, Testa appeared in two episodes of Rhett & Link's Web series, Good Mythical Morning. His shop, Ojai Valley Taxidermy, was promoted in earlier episodes. He again appeared in 2020 as a tiebreaking judge during the Ice Cream Taste Test Tournament.

In 2015, Testa was featured in Season 1, Episode 1 of CarbonTV's original series, American Elements.

In 2016, Testa and Ojai Valley Taxidermy were featured in the Web documentary Mounted: Chuck Testa and Friends on CarbonTV.

== Music ==
Testa was featured in Logan Hugueny-Clark's 2013 "Nuketown the Musical". It is a Call of Duty: Black Ops II musical parody of the 2013 song "Blurred Lines" by Robin Thicke.

The 2019 song "Whip a Tesla" by Yung Gravy and bbno$ mentions Testa in the chorus, referencing the "Nope" meme.

Told your bitch, "Nope", like I'm fuckin' Chuck Testa

Testa makes a cameo in the music video.
