= Stevie Wynne Levine =

American television producer and comedian

- Born: Stevie Wynne Levine; November 4, 1987 (age 38); Harlingen, Texas
- Education: Syracuse University
- Occupations: Comedian, writer, television producer
- Years active: 2013–present
- Employer: Mythical Entertainment
- Known for: Good Mythical Morning
- Title: Chief Creative Officer

Stevie Wynne Levine (born November 4, 1987) is an American comedian and television producer. She is best known for her work as Chief Creative Officer of Mythical Entertainment and as an executive producer of Mythical's YouTube series Good Mythical Morning. She is also well-known as a recurring off-screen narrator and occasional on-screen personality on the show.

== Early life and education ==
Levine was born in Harlingen, Texas. She attended Syracuse University, where she studied television, radio, and film and where she graduated summa cum laude.

== Career ==
=== Early work and The Mythical Show ===
Levine joined the founders of Mythical, Rhett McLaughlin and Link Neal in 2013 to help produce The Mythical Show, one of YouTube’s early original programming initiatives. Neal and McLaughlin had already achieved success with their comedy YouTube channel "Rhett & Link", but were looking to expand.

She later became Chief Creative Officer, handling production across the company's shows, YouTube channels, and podcasts. In her time at Mythical, she played a key role in the company's expansion into a wider range of programs, channels, and even a live tour.

=== Good Mythical Morning ===
Levine is mostly known for her role as producer and narrator for Mythical's YouTube series Good Mythical Morning, leading the YouTube channels' growth to nearly 20 million subscribers. Under her leadership, the show became a daily comedic variety show and is now one of the longest-running and most popular series on YouTube.

=== Industry influence ===
Levine has been credited by Variety as one of the most influential figures behind the rise of creator-led digital media studios and proving the viability of online entertainment as an alternative to traditional television.

== Departure from Mythical Entertainment ==
In 2026, Levine announced that she would be leaving Mythical Entertainment after nearly 13 years with the company. Her departure coincided with the 3000th episode of Good Mythical Morning.

== Personal life ==
Levine has kept much of her personal life private. She is openly a lesbian.

== Controversy ==
In 2019, Levine faced criticism following a panel appearance in which she deadnamed YouTuber Miles McKenna. She later issued a public apology, stating she was unaware that the language used was inappropriate.

== Awards and nominations ==
Year	Title	Nominated	Award	Result
2014	Streamy Awards	Good Mythical Morning	Science and Education	Nominated
2014	Webby Awards	Good Mythical Morning	First Person	Honoree
2014	Webby Awards	Breaking Bad: The Middle School Musical	Comedy Individual Short or Episode – People's Voice	Won
2015	Webby Awards	Epic Rap Battle: Nerd vs. Geek	Viral (Branded) – People's Voice	Won
2015	Webby Awards	Good Mythical Morning	Variety (Channel) – People's Voice	Won
2015	Webby Awards	Good Mythical Morning	First Person – People's Voice	Won
2015	Webby Awards	Good Mythical Morning	Non-fiction	Won
2015	Webby Awards	Good Mythical Morning	Show of the Year	Nominated
2015	Webby Awards	Good Mythical Morning	Best Web Series	Won
2015	Webby Awards	Good Mythical Morning	Best Web Personality (Channel)-People's Voice	Won
2015	Webby Awards	Good Mythical Morning	Online Film & Video – Variety (Channel)	Honoree
2015	Streamy Awards	Good Mythical Morning	Comedy	Won
2015	Streamy Awards	Good Mythical Morning	Best Writing	Nominated
2015	Streamy Awards	Good Mythical Morning	Show of the Year	Nominated
2015	Reality TV Awards	Good Mythical Morning	Digital Reality Series	Nominated
2017	Webby Awards	Good Mythical Morning	Web Personality (Channels and Networks)	Nominated
2017	Webby Awards	Good Mythical Morning	Best Web Personality/Host	Honoree
2018	Shorty Awards	Rhett & Link's Buddy System	Best Web Series	Nominated
2018	Webby Awards	Good Mythical Morning	Best Web Personality/Host (Film & Video)	Nominated
2018	Streamy Awards	Good Mythical Morning	Show of the Year	Nominated
2018	Streamy Awards	Rhett & Link's Buddy System	Comedy Series	Nominated
2019	Shorty Awards	Good Mythical Morning	Best Web Series	Nominated
2019	Webby Awards	Ear Biscuits	Best Host (Podcasts) – People's Voice	Won
2019	Webby Awards	Good Mythical Morning	Show of the Year	Won

== See also ==
- Good Mythical Morning
