= List of Epic Rap Battles of History episodes =

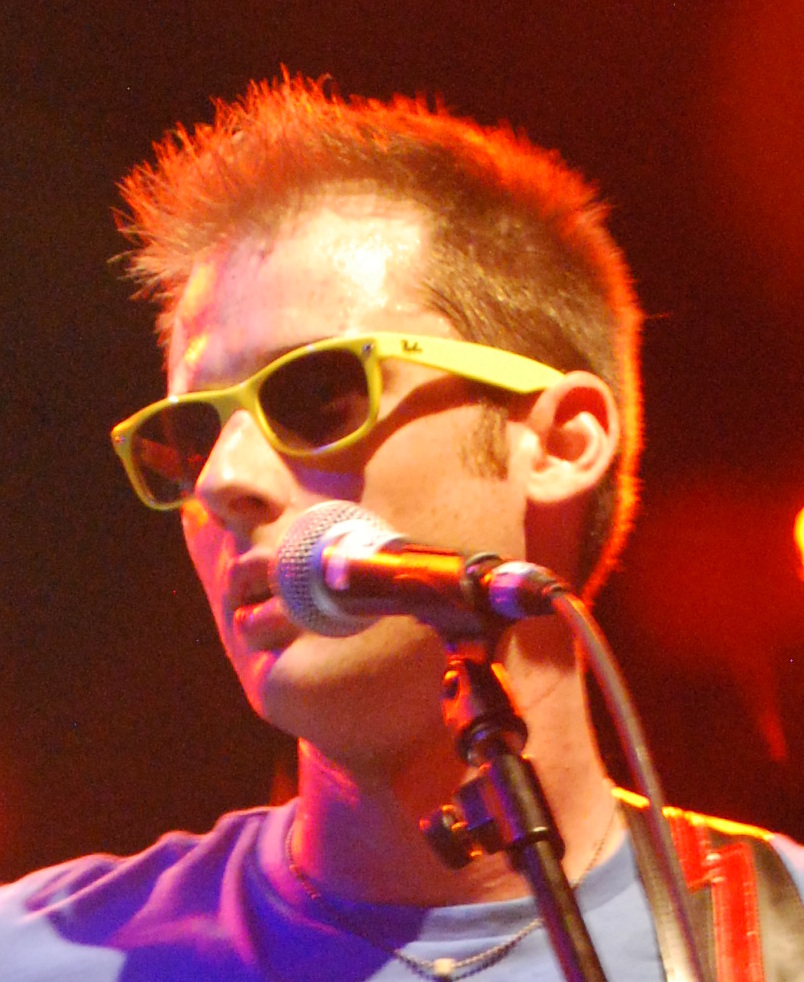
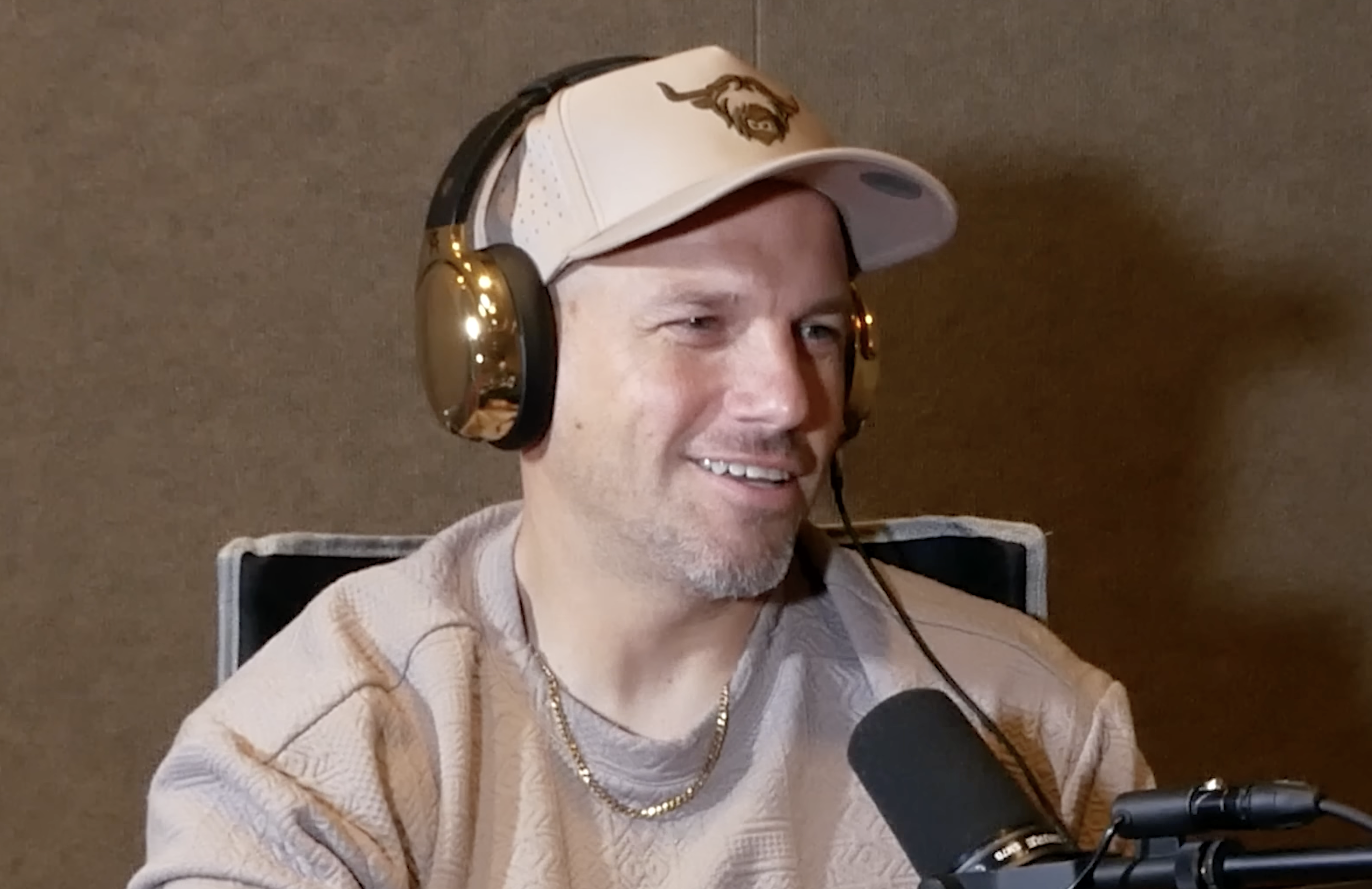
Nice Peter (left; 2011) and EpicLLOYD (right; 2025), the creators of Epic Rap Battles of History

Epic Rap Battles of History is a YouTube series created by Peter "Nice Peter" Shukoff and Lloyd "EpicLLOYD" Ahlquist. The first episode of the series "John Lennon V Bill O'Reilly" was released on September 26, 2010. All Season 1 episodes were uploaded to Shukoff's personal YouTube channel, Nice Peter. Following the show's popularity and success, Ahlquist and Shukoff partnered with Maker Studios, and created two channels devoted to the series. ERB hosts the finished episodes, and ERB2 features behind-the-scenes footage.

On September 26, 2010, "John Lennon V Bill O'Reilly", the first music video was released on Shukoff's channel, where the rest of the first season was released. Since the second season, ERB music videos have been distributed through its own YouTube channel. As of August 2026, it is the 381st most subscribed channel on YouTube with over 15.1 million subscribers and over 4.34 billion total views. As of August 24, 2026, a total of 92 episodes in the official series have been released (and 95 episodes if "PewDiePie vs. T-Series", "Larry Bird vs. Big Bird", and "Henry VIII vs. Hillary Clinton" are included).

In 2013, the single "Barack Obama vs. Mitt Romney", was the first YouTube music video to achieve a gold certification from the Recording Industry Association of America (RIAA). "Darth Vader vs. Hitler" and "Einstein vs. Stephen Hawking" also achieved RIAA gold certification during 2013. "Dr. Seuss vs. Shakespeare", "Master Chief vs. Leonidas", "Steve Jobs vs. Bill Gates" and "Justin Bieber vs. Beethoven" were subsequently certified Gold in 2014. On June 4, 2015, "Mario Bros. vs. Wright Bros.", "Mr T vs. Mr Rogers" and "Abe Lincoln vs. Chuck Norris" achieved RIAA gold certification. On January 29, 2016, "Darth Vader vs. Adolf Hitler 2" was certified gold.

ERBOH Season 1, the series' first album was released on a compact disc through DFTBA Records in December 2011, including all 15 tracks from the first season of the series, including 2 bonus live tracks. Epic Rap Battles of History Season 2 was digitally released on May 22, 2013, on iTunes through Maker Studios. Epic Rap Battles of History Season 3 was released in 2014 through the official ERB website's online shop.

== Overview ==
Season	Episodes	Originally released	
Season	Episodes	First released	Last released
1	15	September 22, 2010 (Note: The censored version was released on September 22, 2010, four days before the main version on September 26.)	November 16, 2011
2	18	December 8, 2011	April 22, 2013
3	12	October 7, 2013	July 14, 2014
4	12	November 10, 2014	August 3, 2015
Bonus		December 16, 2015	
5	12	May 2, 2016	January 9, 2017
Bonus		December 7, 2018	
Flash	3	December 16, 2018	January 26, 2019
6	11	April 20, 2019	December 5, 2020
Cancelled		February 15, 2020	
7	TBA	June 14, 2021	

== Episodes ==
Each episode of Epic Rap Battles of History features a rap battle between iconic characters, real or fictional. Typically, the battles start off as a one-on-one contest, although sometimes two teams face off (such as in "Mario Bros. vs. Wright Bros." and "Artists vs. TMNT"), and in "John Wick vs. John Rambo vs. John McClane" three characters faced off from the start. Starting with "Hulk Hogan and Macho Man vs. Kim Jong-il," it has become common for additional rappers to appear after the first two have already performed verses.

Capitalization and punctuation irregularities in titles as posted to YouTube have been normalized in the following lists.

=== Season 1 (2010–2011) ===
All first season videos were uploaded onto Shukoff's channel, Nice Peter.

No. overall	No. in season	Title	Run time	Original release date	Link
1	1	"John Lennon vs. Bill O'Reilly"	1:37	September 22, 2010	Link
Former Beatle and peace activist John Lennon (Nice Peter) battles against political commentator Bill O'Reilly (EpicLLOYD).
2	2	"Darth Vader vs. Hitler"	1:41	November 10, 2010	Link
Star Wars antagonist Darth Vader (Nice Peter) battles against Nazi Germany dictator Adolf Hitler (EpicLLOYD). The battle ends with Hitler imprisoned in carbonite by Darth Vader (a reference to Han Solo's imprisonment in The Empire Strikes Back). Cameo appearances: Morgan Christensen as a Stormtrooper from Star Wars.
3	3	"Abe Lincoln vs. Chuck Norris"	2:08	December 8, 2010	Link
The 16th president of the United States, Abraham Lincoln (Nice Peter), battles against actor and martial artist Chuck Norris (EpicLLOYD). Note: Instead of sticking to purely factual truths about Abraham Lincoln and himself, Chuck Norris instead heavily utilized absurd hyperbolic "Chuck Norris facts".
4	4	"Sarah Palin vs. Lady Gaga"	2:26	January 12, 2011	Link
Republican politician and former vice-presidential candidate Sarah Palin (Lisa Nova) battles against pop star Lady Gaga (Nice Peter). Cameo appearances: EpicLLOYD as 2008 Republican presidential nominee and Palin's running mate John McCain.
5	5	"Hulk Hogan and Macho Man vs. Kim Jong-il"	2:39	February 2, 2011	Link
Wrestler Hulk Hogan (Nice Peter) battles against second Supreme Leader of North Korea, Kim Jong Il (Tim DeLaGhetto). At one point, Jong-il shoots Hogan with a rocket-propelled grenade, preventing him from continuing. So his partner of the Mega Powers, "Macho Man" Randy Savage (EpicLLOYD) tags in. Note: On May 25, 2019, a re-edited version of this battle was released.
6	6	"Justin Bieber vs. Beethoven"	2:29	March 2, 2011	Link
Classical composer Ludwig van Beethoven (Nice Peter) battles against pop singer Justin Bieber (Alex Farnham). Cameo appearances: EpicLLOYD as Baroque composer Johann Sebastian Bach.
7	7	"Einstein vs. Stephen Hawking"	2:36	March 30, 2011	Link
German-born theoretical physicist Albert Einstein (Zach Sherwin) battles against British theoretical physicist Stephen Hawking (Nice Peter). Cameo appearances: EpicLLOYD as astrophysicist Carl Sagan.
8	8	"Genghis Khan vs. Easter Bunny"	1:57	April 20, 2011	Link
Mongolian Emperor Genghis Khan (EpicLLOYD) battles against the holiday mascot of Easter, the Easter Bunny (Nice Peter). Cameo appearances: Aaron Zaragoza as Christian main figure Jesus Christ, Dante Cimadamore as Jesus Quintana from The Big Lebowski, Kurt Schmidt as 'A Man Named Jesus', and Jon Na as Genghis Khan's descendants.
9	9	"Napoleon vs. Napoleon"	2:19	May 18, 2011	Link
French Emperor Napoleon Bonaparte (EpicLLOYD) battles against fictional nerdy high-school student Napoleon Dynamite (Nice Peter).
10	10	"Billy Mays vs. Ben Franklin"	2:31	June 23, 2011	Link
United States Founding Father and inventor Benjamin Franklin (EpicLLOYD), battles against TV salesman Billy Mays (Colin J. Sweeney). During the battle, Mays suffers a fatal heart attack, and is replaced by fellow TV salesman Vince Offer (Nice Peter). Cameo appearances: Pat McIntyre as fellow United States Founding Father and first president of the United States, George Washington.
11	11	"Gandalf vs. Dumbledore"	2:10	July 14, 2011	Link
The Lord of the Rings wizard Gandalf (EpicLLOYD) battles against Harry Potter wizard Albus Dumbledore (Nice Peter). Cameo appearances: Pat McIntyre as Harry Potter character Gilderoy Lockhart.
12	12	"Dr. Seuss vs. Shakespeare"	2:51	August 17, 2011	Link
Children's book writer Dr. Seuss (Mickey Meyer) battles against English playwright William Shakespeare (George Watsky). Note: In reference to the fact he had throat cancer in real life, Dr. Seuss does not rap himself; instead, he summons his characters The Cat in the Hat (Nice Peter) and Thing One and Thing Two (EpicLLOYD) to participate in the battle for him.
13	13	"Mr. T vs. Mr. Rogers"	2:11	September 14, 2011	Link
Wrestler and actor Mr. T (DeStorm Power, dressed as B. A. Baracus) battles against children's show host Mister Fred Rogers (Nice Peter). Cameo appearances: EpicLLOYD as Mr. McFeely from Mister Rogers' Neighborhood, as well as John "Hannibal" Smith, H. M. Murdock and Templeton "Faceman" Peck from Mr. T's show The A-Team.
14	14	"Columbus vs. Captain Kirk"	2:28	October 10, 2011	Link
Explorer Christopher Columbus (Nice Peter) battles against Star Trek Starship Enterprise captain James T. Kirk (EpicLLOYD). Cameo appearances: Omar Gharaibeh and Jon Na as Star Trek characters Spock and Hikaru Sulu, respectively, and Mary Gutfleisch as a 'Hot Alien' who is beaten up by Kirk.
15	15	"The Final Battle: Nice Peter vs. EpicLLOYD"	2:50	November 18, 2011	Link
The creators of Epic Rap Battles of History, Nice Peter and EpicLLOYD, battle against each other as fictionalized versions of themselves. The battle ends with KassemG intervening to resolve the conflict and suggest to Nice Peter and EpicLLOYD to make a second season and also to create a YouTube channel specifically for the series. The video ends with an announcement of season 2. Cameo appearances: Nice Peter and EpicLLOYD appear as various characters they have played throughout season 1.

=== Season 2 (2011–2013) ===
From the second season onwards, the battles were moved to their own YouTube channel, ERB.

No. overall	No. in season	Title	Run time	Original release date	Link
16	1	"Hitler vs. Vader 2"	2:42	December 8, 2011	Link
Darth Vader (Nice Peter) thaws out Adolf Hitler (EpicLLOYD) at Jabba the Hutt's palace after freezing him in carbonite in season 1, before challenging him to a rematch. The battle ends with Hitler being dropped into the Rancor pit. Cameo appearances: Nice Peter as Stephen Hawking, Morgan Cristensen as a Stormtrooper from Star Wars, and Verona Blue as Boushh the Bounty Hunter, in which Darth Vader disguises as.
17	2	"Master Chief vs. Leonidas"	2:12	January 31, 2012	Link
Halo Spartan-II protagonist Master Chief (Nice Peter) battles against Spartan King Leonidas I (portrayed by Jesse Wellens based on Gerard Butler in the 2007 film 300, voiced by EpicLLOYD). Cameo appearances: Jeana as Leonidas' wife Gorgo, EpicLLOYD as Leonidas' son Pleistarchus (credited as Six Year Old Son), and Gabe Michael and Dante Cimadamore as Spartans.
18	3	"Mario Bros. vs. Wright Bros."	1:46	February 16, 2012	Link
Nintendo's Super Mario Bros. mascots Mario (EpicLLOYD) and Luigi (Nice Peter) battle against Wilbur and Orville Wright (Rhett McLaughlin and Link Neal), inventors of the first successful airplane. Cameo appearances: Ceciley Jenkins as Super Mario character Princess Peach.
19	4	"Michael Jackson vs. Elvis Presley"	2:17	April 2, 2012	Link
The King of Pop, Michael Jackson (Bentley Green and Nice Peter), battles against the King of Rock & Roll, Elvis Presley (EpicLLOYD). Note: In this battle, Bentley Green portrays the younger Jackson and Nice Peter the older Jackson. Cameo appearances: Bentley Green as members of music group The Jackson Five and The Facts of Life character Tootie Ramsey.
20	5	"Cleopatra vs. Marilyn Monroe"	1:46	May 7, 2012	Link
Actress and sex symbol Marilyn Monroe (Kimmy Gatewood) battles against the last Egyptian pharaoh, Cleopatra (Angela Trimbur). Cameo appearances: KassemG as himself, EpicLLOYD as actor Marlon Brando, and Nice Peter as 35th president of the United States, John F. Kennedy.
21	6	"Steve Jobs vs. Bill Gates"	2:48	June 14, 2012	Link
The Chairman of Microsoft, Bill Gates (EpicLLOYD), battles against the CEO of Apple, Steve Jobs (Nice Peter). Midway in the battle, Steve Jobs leaves to "turn heaven a profit" (a reference to his real-life death). HAL 9000 from 2001: A Space Odyssey (voiced by Nice Peter; representing artificial intelligence as a whole) joins the battle, challenging Bill Gates as a third party.
22	7	"Frank Sinatra vs. Freddie Mercury"	2:12	October 1, 2012	Link
Traditional pop singer Frank Sinatra (EpicLLOYD) battles against Queen frontman Freddie Mercury (Nice Peter). Cameo appearances: Tay Zonday as fellow traditional pop singer Sammy Davis Jr.
23	8	"Barack Obama vs. Mitt Romney"	3:30	October 15, 2012	Link
The candidates for the 2012 United States presidential election face off in a rap battle: Republican candidate Mitt Romney (EpicLLOYD) battles against Democratic candidate and 44th president of the United States, Barack Obama (Iman Crosson). In the final verse, the 16th president of the United States, Abraham Lincoln (Nice Peter), returns from season 1 to criticize both candidates.
24	9	"Doc Brown vs. Doctor Who"	2:23	October 29, 2012	Link
Back to the Future DeLorean time machine inventor Dr. Emmett Brown (Zach Sherwin) battles against Doctor Who protagonist The Doctor (Nice Peter as the Tenth Doctor). Halfway through the battle, The Tenth Doctor is shot by a Dalek controlled by Brown, forcing him to regenerate into the Fourth Doctor (George Watsky) for his second verse. Cameo appearances: EpicLLOYD as Back to the Future protagonist Marty McFly, and Dante Cimadamore as a Dalek from Doctor Who.
25	10	"Bruce Lee vs. Clint Eastwood"	1:50	November 12, 2012	Link
Actor and martial artist Bruce Lee (Mike Diva) battles against actor and director Clint Eastwood (EpicLLOYD; portrayed as Man with No Name from the Dollars trilogy). Cameo appearances: Nice Peter as unnamed 'Mustached Cowboys' who attempt to shoot down Clint Eastwood, but are shot by him instead, and Xin Wuku as unnamed 'Urban Ninjas' who Bruce Lee battles and defeats mid-battle, and who act as Bruce Lee's stunt double.
26	11	"Batman vs. Sherlock Holmes"	2:49	November 27, 2012	Link
Fictional detective Sherlock Holmes (Zach Sherwin), battles against comic book hero Batman (Nice Peter). The characters' respective sidekicks, Dr. Watson (Kyle Mooney) and Robin (EpicLLOYD), also participate in the battle.
27	12	"Moses vs. Santa Claus"	2:20	December 10, 2012	Link
Jewish prophet Moses (Snoop Dogg) battles against the modern personification of Christmas, Santa Claus (Nice Peter). Three Christmas elves (EpicLLOYD) join Santa Claus during his second verse. Cameo appearances: Elena Diaz and Monica Weitzel as Moses' Honeys.
28	13	"Adam vs. Eve"	2:04	February 11, 2013	Link
First man Adam (EpicLLOYD) battles against his spouse, first woman Eve (Jenna Marbles). Cameo appearances: Nice Peter as Adam's "friend" Steve.
29	14	"Gandhi vs. Martin Luther King Jr."	1:39	February 25, 2013	Link
The lead figure of the Civil Rights Movement, Martin Luther King Jr. (Jordan Peele), battles against Mahatma Gandhi (Keegan-Michael Key), leader of the Indian independence movement. Cameo appearances: Nice Peter and EpicLLOYD, credited as 'White Preachers', each appear briefly in the respective crowds. Several actors appear as members of the Civil Rights March and the Indian Rights March.
30	15	"Nikola Tesla vs. Thomas Edison"	2:04	March 11, 2013	Link
American inventor Thomas Edison (EpicLLOYD) battles against American electrical engineer Nikola Tesla (portrayed by Dante Cimadamore; voiced by Cimadamore and Nice Peter).
31	16	"Babe Ruth vs. Lance Armstrong"	2:07	March 25, 2013	Link
New York Yankees baseball player Babe Ruth (EpicLLOYD) battles against former road racing cyclist Lance Armstrong (Nice Peter).
32	17	"Mozart vs. Skrillex"	2:09	April 8, 2013	Link
18th century classical composer Wolfgang Amadeus Mozart (Nice Peter) battles against dubstep musician Skrillex (EpicLLOYD).
33	18	"Rasputin vs. Stalin"	3:38	April 22, 2013	Link
Russian mystic Grigori Rasputin (Nice Peter) battles against Soviet Union General Secretary Joseph Stalin (EpicLLOYD). Communist leader Vladimir Lenin (Nice Peter), Soviet statesman Mikhail Gorbachev (EpicLLOYD), and incumbent president of Russia Vladimir Putin (Nice Peter) also participate in the battle. Cameo appearances: Felix "PewDiePie" Kjellberg as Russian ballet dancer Mikhail Baryshnikov.

=== Season 3 (2013–2014) ===
No. overall	No. in season	Title	Run time	Original release date	Link
34	1	"Hitler vs. Vader 3"	2:38	October 7, 2013	Link
Adolf Hitler (EpicLLOYD) escapes from the Rancor pit and challenges Darth Vader (Nice Peter) for a final rematch. At one point during the battle, Vader's bounty hunter Boba Fett (voiced by Ray William Johnson, portrayed by Atul Singh and Brian Neunhoffer) briefly joins in, but is then shot by Hitler. The battle ends with Hitler getting sliced in half by Vader. Cameo appearances: KassemG and Morgan Christensen as Star Wars characters Lando Calrissian and Stormtroopers, respectively. Characters from past episodes, including Abraham Lincoln (Nice Peter), Stephen Hawking (Nice Peter), "Macho Man" Randy Savage (EpicLLOYD), the Fourth Doctor (George Watsky), and Leonidas (Jesse Wellens), also reappear.
35	2	"Blackbeard vs. Al Capone"	2:39	October 21, 2013	Link
English pirate Blackbeard (Nice Peter) battles against American gangster Al Capone (EpicLLOYD). Note: This episode is sponsored by the video game franchise Assassin's Creed to promote the game Assassin's Creed IV: Black Flag. Cameo appearances: Xin Wuku as Assassin's Creed IV: Black Flag protagonist Edward Kenway; Bryce Wissel, Shaun Lewin and Donnie Davis as pirates; Shaun Lewin, Yev Belilovskiy and Dante Cimadamore as gangsters.
36	3	"Miley Cyrus vs. Joan of Arc"	2:25	November 4, 2013	Link
Singer and actress Miley Cyrus (Michelle Glavan) battles against French folk heroine Joan of Arc (Jessi Smiles). Cameo appearances: Nice Peter and EpicLLOYD as Hannah Montana characters Miley Stewart and Lilly Truscott, respectively.
37	4	"Bob Ross vs. Pablo Picasso"	2:06	November 18, 2013	Link
American painter and The Joy of Painting host Bob Ross (Nice Peter) battles against Spanish painter and co-founder of the Cubist movement Pablo Picasso (EpicLLOYD). Cameo appearances: Bob the dog as Lump. Characters from past episodes, including Billy Mays (Collin J. Sweeney), Mr. Rogers (Nice Peter), and the Fourth Doctor (George Watsky), reappear.
38	5	"Michael Jordan vs. Muhammad Ali"	2:36	December 3, 2013	Link
Former boxing champion Muhammad Ali (Jordan Peele) battles against former NBA basketball star Michael Jordan (Keegan-Michael Key).
39	6	"Donald Trump vs. Ebenezer Scrooge"	3:26	December 19, 2013	Link
Business magnate Donald Trump (Nice Peter) battles against Ebenezer Scrooge (Zach Sherwin), the main character of Charles Dickens' novel A Christmas Carol - off which the episode's plot is based around. Trump begins the battle with a single verse, filling in the role of Jacob Marley. The three Ghosts of Christmas then arrive – first the Ghost of Christmas Past (disguised as banker J. P. Morgan portrayed by EpicLLOYD), then the Ghost of Christmas Present (disguised as rapper Kanye West portrayed by DeStorm Power), and finally the Ghost of Christmas Yet to Come (portrayed by Nice Peter). This ultimately leads Scrooge to develop holiday spirit. Note: This battle portrays Trump as a businessman and television personality, nearly three years before he would assume his position as the 45th president of the United States. Cameo appearances: Kai and Naya Berman as Ignorance and Want (credited as Children Ghosts) from A Christmas Carol.
40	7	"Rick Grimes vs. Walter White"	2:17	May 5, 2014	Link
Breaking Bad protagonist Walter White (EpicLLOYD) battles against The Walking Dead protagonist Rick Grimes (Nice Peter). Cameo appearances: Amy Bury, Neil Blan, Ray Timmons and Tom Walsh as Walkers.
41	8	"Goku vs. Superman"	1:48	May 19, 2014	Link
Comic book superhero Superman (EpicLLOYD) battles against Dragon Ball manga protagonist Goku (Ray William Johnson). Cameo appearances: Nice Peter as Superman character Jimmy Olsen and Dragon Ball character Krillin.
42	9	"Stephen King vs. Edgar Allan Poe"	2:27	June 2, 2014	Link
19th century poet and horror author Edgar Allan Poe (George Watsky) battles against best-selling horror author Stephen King (Zach Sherwin).
43	10	"Sir Isaac Newton vs. Bill Nye"	2:47	June 16, 2014	Link
American scientist and television host Bill Nye (Nice Peter) battles against English physicist Sir Isaac Newton ("Weird Al" Yankovic). At one point, American astrophysicist Neil deGrasse Tyson (Chali 2na) steps in and battles in Nye's place. Cameo appearances: EpicLLOYD as astrophysicist Carl Sagan, who previously appeared in season 1.
44	11	"George Washington vs. William Wallace"	2:32	June 30, 2014	Link
Scottish revolutionary William Wallace (EpicLLOYD, based on Mel Gibson in the 1995 film Braveheart), battles against first president of the United States, George Washington (Nice Peter). Cameo appearances: Jack Zullo, Mike Elder, and Jeff MacKinnon as Americans; Reynaldo Garnica, Seth Brown, and Joey Greer as Scotsmen.
45	12	"Artists vs. TMNT"	2:14	July 14, 2014	Link
Renaissance artists Leonardo da Vinci (Link Neal), Donatello di Betto Bardi (Rhett McLaughlin), Michelangelo Buonarroti (Ian Hecox), and Raphael Sanzio (Anthony Padilla) battle against their namesake Teenage Mutant Ninja Turtles protagonists Leonardo, Donatello, Michelangelo, and Raphael (voiced by Nice Peter and EpicLLOYD, all portrayed by EpicLLOYD). Cameo appearances: Xin Wuku as Teenage Mutant Ninja Turtles' stunt doubles.

=== Season 4 (2014–2015) ===
No. overall	No. in season	Title	Run time	Original release date	Link
46	1	"Ghostbusters vs. Mythbusters"	2:27	November 10, 2014	Link
MythBusters hosts Jamie Hyneman (Nice Peter) and Adam Savage (EpicLLOYD) battle against Ghostbusters protagonists Peter Venkman (Chris Gorbos), Ray Stantz (Mark Douglas), Egon Spengler (Zach Sherwin), and Winston Zeddemore (Walter Downing). The former MythBusters "Build Team", consisting of Tory Belleci (Chris Alvarado), Kari Byron (Mary Gutfleisch), and Grant Imahara (KRNFX), join the battle to back up Hyneman and Savage. The Stay Puft Marshmallow Man (voiced by EpicLLOYD, portrayed by Taylor Cu) from Ghostbusters also joins the battle to face both teams as a third party. Cameo appearances: Brooke "Dodger" Leigh Lawson as Ghostbusters character Janine Melnitz.
47	2	"Romeo and Juliet vs. Bonnie and Clyde"	3:06	November 17, 2014	Link
The title characters of William Shakespeare's tragedy Romeo and Juliet, Romeo Montague and Juliet Capulet (Nice Peter and Grace Helbig), battle against American outlaws Bonnie Parker and Clyde Barrow (Hannah Hart and EpicLLOYD). The battle ends with Romeo and Juliet both committing suicide while Bonnie and Clyde, both left confused getting shot in a barrage of gunfire.
48	3	"Zeus vs. Thor"	3:01	November 24, 2014	Link
The Greek god of thunder, Zeus (voiced by Nice Peter), battles against the Norse god of thunder, Thor (voiced by EpicLLOYD). Note: The video was filmed using stop motion animation with Lego minifigures by Forrest Whaley, Sean Willets and Zach Macias. Cameo appearances: Various characters from Greek and Norse mythology appear as background characters. A Lego version of actress Natalie Portman (referred to in the lyrics as such, but using a minifigure of Padmé Amidala from Star Wars, a character played by Portman) briefly appears, and the Lego version of Loki uses the likeness of the Marvel Cinematic Universe version of the character, as based on actor Tom Hiddleston's portrayal.
49	4	"Jack the Ripper vs. Hannibal Lecter"	3:05	December 1, 2014	Link
Fictional serial killer and cannibal Hannibal Lecter (EpicLLOYD) battles against the unidentified Victorian serial killer Jack the Ripper (Dan Bull). Cameo appearances: David Thornhill Jr. as Hannibal Lecter character Barney Matthews.
50	5	"Oprah vs. Ellen"	2:48	December 8, 2014	Link
Talk show host and media proprietor Oprah Winfrey (Nikki "November Christine" Jenkins) battles against fellow talk show host and actress Ellen DeGeneres (Lauren Flans). Note: This episode is also known as "Oprah Winfrey vs. Ellen DeGeneres". Cameo appearances: Atul Singh as Oprah's partner Stedman Graham and EpicLLOYD as television host Dr. Phil McGraw.
51	6	"Steven Spielberg vs. Alfred Hitchcock"	3:59	December 15, 2014	Link
Film directors Steven Spielberg (Nice Peter) and Alfred Hitchcock (EpicLLOYD) face off in a rap battle. The two are later joined by fellow film directors Quentin Tarantino (Wax), Stanley Kubrick (Ruggles Outbound), and Michael Bay (Nice Peter).
52	7	"Lewis and Clark vs. Bill and Ted"	2:53	May 25, 2015	Link
American explorers Meriwether Lewis (Link Neal) and William Clark (Rhett McLaughlin) battle against the main characters of Bill & Ted, Bill S. Preston and Ted Logan (EpicLLOYD and Nice Peter). Cameo appearances: Michelle Maloney as the Lewis and Clark Expedition's Lemhi Shoshone guide Sacagawea, Sam Macaroni as Bill & Ted character Rufus, and Mike Betette as a bear. 19th-century American gunfighter Billy the Kid (Nice Peter; reused footage of the Mustached Cowboy cameos from Season 2) and Greek philosopher Socrates (EpicLLOYD) make brief cameos, while several figures from past episodes, including Napoleon Bonaparte (EpicLLOYD), Ludwig van Beethoven (Nice Peter), Genghis Khan (EpicLLOYD), Abraham Lincoln (Nice Peter), and Joan of Arc (Jessi Smiles), reappear.
53	8	"David Copperfield vs. Harry Houdini"	2:20	June 8, 2015	Link
American illusionist David Copperfield (Nice Peter) battles against Hungarian-American illusionist and stunt performer Harry Houdini (EpicLLOYD). Note: Tony Clark served as the consultant for the magic tricks and illusions performed in the video. Cameo appearances: Dante Cimadamore as American magician and illusionist Criss Angel, Josie Ahlquist as Houdini's wife Bess Houdini, Lauren Francesca as Copperfield's wife Chloe Gosselin (credited as Copperfield's Assistant), and Tony Clark as a police officer.
54	9	"Terminator vs. RoboCop"	3:08	June 22, 2015	Link
Cyborg assassin The Terminator (EpicLLOYD), battles against cybernetically enhanced police officer RoboCop (Nice Peter). Notes: The video promotes the film Terminator Genisys (2015), which released one month later. Cameo appearances: Original Terminator actor Arnold Schwarzenegger appears at the end of the video lip-syncing the outro.
55	10	"Eastern Philosophers vs. Western Philosophers"	4:19	July 6, 2015	Link
Chinese philosophers Confucius (MC Jin), Sun Tzu (Timothy DeLaGhetto), and Lao Tzu (KRNFX) battle against Greek philosopher Socrates (EpicLLOYD), German philosopher Friedrich Nietzsche (Nice Peter), and French philosopher Voltaire (Zach Sherwin). The battle ends with members of both teams turning on each other.
56	11	"Shaka Zulu vs. Julius Caesar"	2:17	July 20, 2015	Link
Zulu Kingdom monarch Shaka Zulu (DeStorm Power) battles against Ancient Roman dictator Julius Caesar (Nice Peter). Cameo appearances: Greg "Klarity" Davis Jr. as Zulu warriors and EpicLLOYD as Roman soldiers.
57	12	"Jim Henson vs. Stan Lee"	5:32	August 3, 2015	Link
Marvel Comics writer and CEO Stan Lee (EpicLLOYD) battles against The Muppets creator Jim Henson (Nice Peter). Henson's most famous creation Kermit the Frog (voiced by Nice Peter) performs the first verse with him before Henson puts him away in the second. Near the end, entertainment mogul Walt Disney (Zach Sherwin) — whose company owns Marvel Comics and The Muppets – joins the battle. Cameo appearances: Mary Gutfleisch as Disney animators.

=== Bonus Battle (2015) ===
No.	Title	Run time	Original release date	Link
58	"Deadpool vs. Boba Fett"	2:47	December 16, 2015	Link
Star Wars antagonistic bounty hunter Boba Fett (voiced by Nice Peter, portrayed by Ivan "Flipz" Velez) battles against comic book antihero Deadpool (voiced by EpicLLOYD, portrayed by Robert Hoffman). Cameo appearances: Edward Vilderman, Dante Cimadamore, EpicLLOYD and Forrest Whaley as "street toughs". Nice Peter and EpicLLOYD as rebel soldiers.

=== Season 5 (2016–2017) ===
No. overall	No. in season	Title	Run time	Original release date	Link
59	1	"J. R. R. Tolkien vs. George R. R. Martin"	2:48	May 2, 2016	Link
British writer and The Lord of the Rings author J. R. R. Tolkien (Nice Peter) battles against American novelist George R. R. Martin (EpicLLOYD), author of A Song of Ice and Fire (which is adapted into HBO's television series Game of Thrones). Cameo appearances: Rudy Fermin, Ricky Mammone, and Ceciley Jenkins as A Song of Ice and Fire/Game of Thrones characters Jon Snow, Hodor, and Daenerys Targaryen (credited as Khaleesi), respectively. Joey Greer as a human warrior and orc. Sulai Lopez and Shaun Lewin as elves. Dante Cimadamore as rock band Led Zeppelin (John Bonham, John Paul Jones, and Jimmy Page). EpicLLOYD as The Goonies character Mikey Walsh.
60	2	"Gordon Ramsay vs. Julia Child"	3:16	May 18, 2016	Link
British chef Gordon Ramsay (EpicLLOYD) battles against American chef Julia Child (Mamrie Hart). Cameo appearances: Michelle Maloney, Layne Pavoggi, Yev Belilovskiy, Ceciley Jenkins, and Jay Houn as Ramsay's production team. Felicia Folkes, Sulai Lopez, Dante Cimadamore, and Mike Betette as the "Blue Team" from Hell's Kitchen. A dog named Pebbles also made a brief appearance in the video.
61	3	"Frederick Douglass vs. Thomas Jefferson"	3:22	May 30, 2016	Link
American abolitionist and statesman Frederick Douglass (J. B. Smoove) battles against the third president of the United States, Thomas Jefferson (Nice Peter). Cameo appearances: Characters from past episodes, including Marilyn Monroe (Kimmy Gatewood), Babe Ruth (EpicLLOYD), Benjamin Franklin (EpicLLOYD), Barack Obama (Iman Crosson), Thomas Edison (EpicLLOYD), Clint Eastwood (EpicLLOYD), Elvis Presley (EpicLLOYD), and Hulk Hogan (Nice Peter), reappear.
62	4	"James Bond vs. Austin Powers"	4:03	June 14, 2016	Link
Fictional MI6 agent James Bond (Ben Atha as Daniel Craig) battles against fictional spy Austin Powers (Nice Peter). The original James Bond (EpicLLOYD as Sean Connery) interjects and faces off against the two. Cameo appearances: Samantha Kellie, Sulai Lopez and Dante Cimadamore as Ming Tea (credited as Go Go Dancers).
63	5	"Bruce Banner vs. Bruce Jenner"	3:35	June 29, 2016	Link
Comic book superhero and scientist, Bruce Banner (EpicLLOYD), battles against former Olympic champion, Bruce Jenner (Nice Peter). Partway through the battle, they transform into The Hulk (Mike O'Hearn) and Caitlyn Jenner (Jolie "NoShame" Drake), respectively.
64	6	"Alexander the Great vs. Ivan the Terrible"	4:29	July 12, 2016	Link
Tsar Ivan the Terrible of Russia (Nice Peter) battles against King Alexander the Great of Macedon (Zach Sherwin). Alexander dies after being poisoned by a drink given by Ivan. King Frederick the Great of Prussia (EpicLLOYD) appears and continues the battle. Ivan attempts to decapitate him with a garrote wire, but Frederick has already died silently in his armchair. Roman general Pompey the Great (Mike Betette) attempts to take up the battle, but is abruptly beheaded by Empress Catherine the Great of Russia (Meghan Tonjes), who then finishes the battle. Cameo appearances: Illjaz Jusufi and Burim Jusufi as Catherine the Great's backup dancers. Characters from the season 2 finale, Mikhail Baryshnikov (PewDiePie), Grigori Rasputin (Nice Peter), Vladimir Lenin (Nice Peter), Mikhail Gorbachev (EpicLLOYD), Vladimir Putin (Nice Peter), and Joseph Stalin (EpicLLOYD), reappear.
65	7	"Donald Trump vs. Hillary Clinton"	4:34	October 26, 2016	Link
The candidates for the 2016 United States presidential election face off in a rap battle: Republican candidate Donald Trump (EpicLLOYD) battles against Democratic candidate Hillary Clinton (Kimmy Gatewood). In the final verse, the 16th president of the United States, Abraham Lincoln (Nice Peter), returns once again from season 1 to criticize both running candidates, but ultimately takes Clinton’s side against Trump. Cameo appearances: Josh Best as a United States Secret Service agent.
66	8	"Ash Ketchum vs. Charles Darwin"	2:24	November 14, 2016	Link
The main protagonist of the Pokémon anime series, Ash Ketchum (Brian Walters), battles against English naturalist Charles Darwin (Nice Peter). Cameo appearances: EpicLLOYD as Evil Dead protagonist Ash Williams. Mary Gutfleisch and Dante Cimadamore as Pokémon characters Jessie and James from Team Rocket. Cimadamore also appears as The March of Progress.
67	9	"Wonder Woman vs. Stevie Wonder"	2:33	November 28, 2016	Link
Comic book superheroine Wonder Woman (Lilly Singh) battles against American singer-songwriter Stevie Wonder (T-Pain). Cameo appearances: Nice Peter as comic book hero Batman, who previously appeared in season 2. Lilly Singh as Stevie Wonder's children and partners.
68	10	"Tony Hawk vs. Wayne Gretzky"	2:50	December 12, 2016	Link
Skateboarder Tony Hawk (Nice Peter) battles against former ice hockey player Wayne Gretzky (Zach Sherwin). Note: Final appearance of Zach Sherwin until season 7 as John Wick. Cameo appearances: EpicLLOYD as fellow ice hockey player Bobby Orr.
69	11	"Theodore Roosevelt vs. Winston Churchill"	3:09	December 26, 2016	Link
26th president of the United States, Theodore Roosevelt (EpicLLOYD), battles against former Prime Minister of the United Kingdom, Winston Churchill (Dan Bull). Cameo appearances: Nice Peter as fellow U.S. presidents and the faces of Mount Rushmore (George Washington, Thomas Jefferson and Abraham Lincoln). Javi Sánchez-Blanco as assassin John Schrank.
70	12	"Nice Peter vs. EpicLLOYD 2"	3:31	January 9, 2017	Link
The creators of Epic Rap Battles of History, Nice Peter and EpicLLOYD, battle for the second time against each other. In the end, they apologize to each other after their argument climaxes, and they decide to take a break and write their next song. Cameo appearances: Dante Cimadamore as himself. Atul Singh, Matthew Schlissel, Shaun Lewin, Brittany White, Ashlyn McIntyre, Morgan Christensen, Sulai Lopez, Jon Na, Jose "Choco" Reynoso, Josh Best, Ryan Moulton, Javi Sánchez-Blanco, Andrew Sherman, and Kyle Herman as the ERB Crew.

=== Bonus Battle (2018) ===
No.	Title	Run time	Original release date	Link
71	"Elon Musk vs. Mark Zuckerberg"	2:43	December 7, 2018	Link
Business magnate, SpaceX CEO/founder and Tesla, Inc. CEO Elon Musk (EpicLLOYD) battles against Facebook CEO and co-founder Mark Zuckerberg (Nice Peter) – a reference to the Musk vs. Zuckerberg feud. Note: This battle is also considered to be an unofficial premiere of Season 6, according to EpicLLOYD. Cameo appearances: EpicLLOYD as United States Senator Dianne Feinstein and Star Trek character Captain Jean-Luc Picard.

=== Flash in the Pan Hip Hop Conflicts of Nowadays (2018–2019) ===
Flash in the Pan Hip Hop Conflicts of Nowadays is a pseudo-spinoff of Epic Rap Battles, created without the complex visual effects and accents normally used for the original series. Instead, Shukoff and Alquist rap together in the same room, over one take. This approach was used for rap battle ideas that the two considered worthy of a rap battle, but not worthy enough to demand a full production. "Ronald McDonald vs. The Burger King" would later go on to earn a fully-produced rap battle in Season 6.

No. in season	Title	Theme	Run time	Original release date	Link
1	"PewDiePie vs. T-Series"	YouTube	1:53	December 16, 2018	Link
YouTuber PewDiePie (EpicLLOYD) battles against a representation of Indian music record label T-Series (Nice Peter) – a reference to the PewDiePie vs. T-Series YouTube subscriber battle.
2	"Ronald McDonald vs. The Burger King"	Fast food	2:11	January 5, 2019	Link
McDonald's mascot Ronald McDonald (Nice Peter) battles against Burger King mascot The Burger King (EpicLLOYD).
3	"Larry Bird vs. Big Bird"	Bird vs Bird	2:21	January 26, 2019	Link
Former NBA player Larry Bird (EpicLLOYD) battles against Sesame Street character Big Bird (Nice Peter).

=== Season 6 (2019–2020) ===
No. overall	No. in season	Title	Run time	Original release date	Link
72	1	"Freddy Krueger vs. Wolverine"	3:22	April 20, 2019	Link
A Nightmare on Elm Street antagonist Freddy Krueger (Wax) battles against comic book superhero Wolverine (EpicLLOYD). Cameo appearances: Nice Peter as Edward Scissorhands and Atul Singh as Friday the 13th antagonist Jason Voorhees.
73	2	"Guy Fawkes vs. Che Guevara"	2:40	May 4, 2019	Link
English Catholic revolutionary Guy Fawkes (Nice Peter) battles against Argentine guerrilla leader Che Guevara (Robert Rico), in a contest of the failed revolutionaries. Cameo appearances: EpicLLOYD as banker J. P. Morgan (reused footage from Season 3 episode "Donald Trump vs. Ebenezer Scrooge").
74	3	"Ronald McDonald vs. The Burger King"	3:00	June 8, 2019	Link
McDonald's mascot Ronald McDonald (Nice Peter) battles against Burger King mascot The Burger King (EpicLLOYD). The two are later joined by Wendy's mascot Wendy (MC Goldiloxx). Cameo appearances: Atul Singh as an abandoned kid.
75	4	"George Carlin vs. Richard Pryor"	4:21	July 13, 2019	Link
American stand-up comedians George Carlin (Nice Peter) and Richard Pryor (ZEALE) battle each other before being interrupted by fellow comedians Bill Cosby (Gary Anthony Williams), Joan Rivers (Jackie Tohn) and Robin Williams (EpicLLOYD).
76	5	"Jacques Cousteau vs. Steve Irwin"	2:39	August 18, 2019	Link
French oceanographer Jacques Cousteau (Nice Peter) battles against Australian zookeeper and conservationist Steve Irwin (EpicLLOYD).
77	6	"Mother Teresa vs. Sigmund Freud"	2:44	September 22, 2019	Link
Albanian-Indian Catholic Saint Mother Teresa (Cara Francis) battles against Austrian neurologist Sigmund Freud (Nice Peter).
78	7	"Vlad the Impaler vs. Count Dracula"	3:16	October 25, 2019	Link
Romanian ruler Vlad the Impaler (EpicLLOYD) battles against fictional Transylvanian vampire Count Dracula (Nice Peter). Cameo appearances: Morgan Christensen as Renfield from Dracula.
79	8	"The Joker vs. Pennywise"	4:02	November 23, 2019	Link
DC Comics supervillain character The Joker (Nice Peter) battles against Stephen King's It clown monster Pennywise the Clown (EpicLLOYD). Cameo appearances: EpicLLOYD as Superman, Nice Peter as Batman, and Lilly Singh as Wonder Woman (reused footage from previous episodes).
80	9	"Thanos vs. J. Robert Oppenheimer"	3:22	December 18, 2019	Link
Comic book villain Thanos (EpicLLOYD) battles against American theoretical physicist J. Robert Oppenheimer (Nice Peter).
81	10	"Donald Trump vs. Joe Biden"	3:48	October 24, 2020	Link
The candidates of the 2020 United States presidential election face off in a rap battle: Democratic candidate Joe Biden (Nice Peter) battles against Republican candidate and 45th president of the United States, Donald Trump (EpicLLOYD). Cameo appearances: EpicLLOYD and Nice Peter as two Russian hackers who accidentally hack into the rap battle.
82	11	"Harry Potter vs. Luke Skywalker"	4:33	December 5, 2020	Link
Star Wars protagonist and Jedi knight Luke Skywalker (Nice Peter) battles against wizard hero Harry Potter (Dave "Boyinaband" Brown). Note: The video was filmed using stop motion animation with Lego minifigures by Forrest Whaley, Sean Willets and Zach Macias. Cameo appearances: Nice Peter as Star Wars characters Han Solo and Yoda and The Jackpot Golden Boys as Ron, Fred, and George Weasley from Harry Potter. Several other characters from the Harry Potter and Star Wars universe make appearances as background characters. A lego version of singer Selena Gomez also briefly appears.

=== Cancelled episode (2020) ===
No. in season	Title	Run time	Original release date	Link
1	"Henry VIII vs. Hillary Clinton"	4:58	February 15, 2020	Link
King of England Henry VIII (Shay Carl) battles against U.S. Secretary of State Hillary Clinton (Susan Deming). Note: Originally intended to be part of the second season, but was left unfinished. The video was later released in its incomplete state. Cameo appearances: EpicLLOYD as 42nd president of the United States, Bill Clinton, and Nice Peter as himself being beheaded by an executioner (portrayed by an uncredited actor).

=== Season 7 (2021–present) ===
As a result of the COVID-19 pandemic, ERB chose to transition into a seventh season early rather than continuing Season 6.

No. overall	No. in season	Title	Run time	Original release date	Link
83	1	"Ragnar Lodbrok vs. Richard the Lionheart"	3:43	June 14, 2021	Link
Legendary Viking king Ragnar Lodbrok (EpicLLOYD, based on Travis Fimmel in the TV drama series Vikings) battles against medieval English monarch Richard the Lionheart (Nice Peter). Note: The episode was sponsored by the video game Rise of Kingdoms.
84	2	"Jeff Bezos vs. Mansa Musa"	4:38	November 27, 2021	Link
American billionaire and founder of Amazon Jeff Bezos (EpicLLOYD) battles against Mansa Musa of the Mali Empire (Scru Face Jean), considered one of the wealthiest men in history. Note: The episode was sponsored by the service NordVPN. Cameo appearances: Atul Singh as an Amazon worker, EpicLLOYD as Captain Kirk (reused footage), and an Amazon Echo with Alexa.
85	3	"John Wick vs. John Rambo vs. John McClane"	4:24	December 18, 2021	Link
Action movie protagonists John Wick (Zach Sherwin), John Rambo (Nice Peter), and John McClane (EpicLLOYD) face off in a three way battle. Note: This is the only episode where any character faces off in a battle other than a two-way. Cameo appearances: Josh Best as Sam Trautman from Rambo.
86	4	"Lara Croft vs. Indiana Jones"	4:24	October 25, 2022	Link
Fictional archaeologists Lara Croft (Croix Provence) and Indiana Jones (Nice Peter) face off in a rap battle. Note: The episode was sponsored by the video game Raid: Shadow Legends. This is the first episode to feature a sponsorship before the main feature. Cameo appearances: Atul Singh as a swordsman, EpicLLOYD as Mutt Williams from Indiana Jones.
87	5	"Henry Ford vs. Karl Marx"	3:13	December 1, 2023	Link
American business magnate and founder of the Ford Motor Company Henry Ford (Nice Peter) battles against German-born philosopher and co-author of The Communist Manifesto Karl Marx (EpicLLOYD).
88	6	"Godzilla vs. King Kong"	3:56	February 23, 2024	Link
Kaiju monsters Godzilla (Nice Peter) and King Kong (EpicLLOYD) face off in a battle. Note: This episode was made using CGI motion capture to represent both Godzilla and King Kong. Cameo appearances: CGI models of Rodan, Mothra, and Mechagodzilla.
89	7	"Donald Trump vs. Kamala Harris"	5:25	October 26, 2024	Link
The candidates of the 2024 United States presidential election face off in a rap battle: Republican candidate Donald Trump (EpicLLOYD) battles against Democratic candidate and 49th vice president of the United States Kamala Harris (Kimberly Michelle Vaughn). In the final verse, the 26th president of the United States, Theodore Roosevelt (EpicLLOYD) returns from season 5 to criticize both running candidates. Cameo appearances: Nice Peter as 46th president of the United States Joe Biden.
90	8	"Napoleon vs. Charlemagne"	3:16	February 12, 2025	Link
Holy Roman Emperor Charlemagne (EpicLLOYD) battles against French Emperor Napoleon Bonaparte (Nice Peter). Note: This is the first episode in which a character returns in a non-election, non-sequel battle, with Napoleon Bonaparte first battling in a Season 1 episode.
91	9	"Red Baron vs. White Death"	2:25	December 12, 2025	Link
German World War I pilot Manfred von Richthofen (Nice Peter), also known as "The Red Baron", faces off against Finnish World War II sniper Simo Häyhä (EpicLLOYD), also known as "The White Death".
92	10	"Tom Cruise vs Evel Knievel"	2:19	August 19, 2026	Link
Actor, film producer and stuntman Tom Cruise (Evan Farrante) faces off against daredevil and entertainer Evel Knievel (EpicLLOYD). Cameo appearances: Nice Peter as Rain Man character Raymond Babbitt.

== Viewership ==
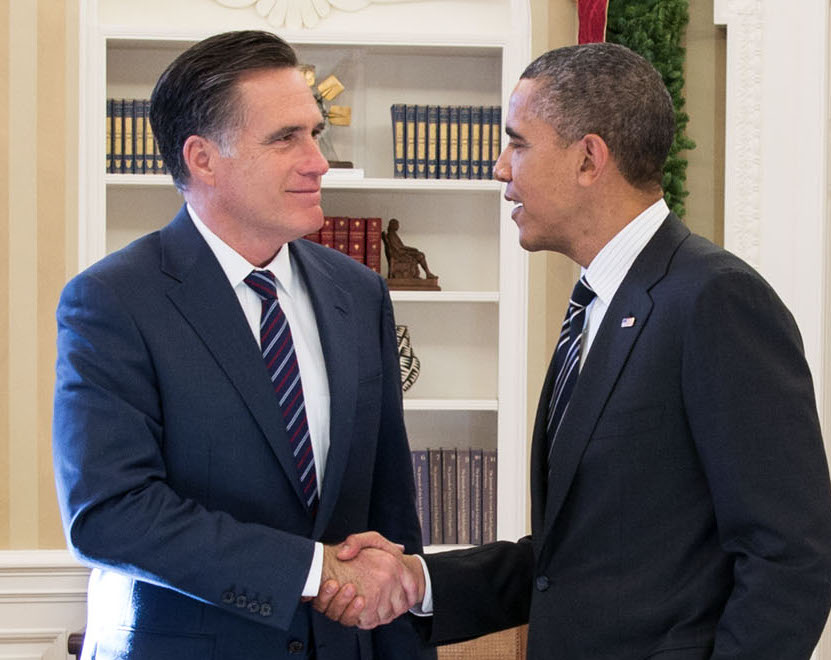
Mitt Romney (left) with Barack Obama (right), the subjects of the most viewed episode of Epic Rap Battles of History

Note: View counts are estimations as of August 24, 2026

Certified gold by the RIAA

Title	Video upload date	Views (as of August 24, 2026)
John Lennon vs. Bill O'Reilly	September 22, 2010	42,353,793 (Note: This is a combined viewcount of both censored and uncensored versions.)
Darth Vader vs. Hitler	November 10, 2010	128,098,750
Abe Lincoln vs. Chuck Norris	December 8, 2010	87,369,702
Sarah Palin vs. Lady Gaga	January 12, 2011	49,642,336
Hulk Hogan and Macho Man vs. Kim Jong Il	February 2, 2011	53,146,786 (Note: This is a combined viewcount of both original and new edit versions.)
Justin Bieber vs. Beethoven	March 2, 2011	102,760,860
Albert Einstein vs. Stephen Hawking	March 30, 2011	139,265,850
Genghis Khan vs. Easter Bunny	April 20, 2011	44,071,677
Napoleon Bonaparte vs. Napoleon Dynamite	May 18, 2011	56,040,301
Billy Mays vs. Ben Franklin	June 23, 2011	47,680,164
Gandalf vs. Dumbledore	July 14, 2011	57,084,976
Dr. Seuss vs. Shakespeare	August 17, 2011	102,566,776
Mr. T vs. Mr. Rogers	September 14, 2011	88,523,976
Columbus vs. Captain Kirk	October 10, 2011	44,391,648
Nice Peter vs. EpicLLOYD	November 18, 2011	41,141,760
Hitler vs. Vader 2	December 8, 2011	109,843,923
Master Chief vs. Leonidas	January 31, 2012	109,579,135
Mario Bros. (Mario and Luigi) vs. Wright Bros	February 16, 2012	106,342,394
Michael Jackson vs. Elvis Presley	April 2, 2012	98,518,263
Cleopatra vs. Marilyn Monroe	May 7, 2012	96,579,125
Steve Jobs vs. Bill Gates	June 14, 2012	162,640,369
Frank Sinatra vs. Freddie Mercury	October 1, 2012	66,879,988
Barack Obama vs. Mitt Romney	October 15, 2012	165,035,147
Doc Brown vs. Doctor Who	October 29, 2012	62,180,084
Clint Eastwood vs. Bruce Lee	November 12, 2012	72,513,908
Batman vs. Sherlock Holmes	November 27, 2012	80,163,055
Moses vs. Santa Claus	December 10, 2012	92,845,390
Adam vs. Eve	February 11, 2013	82,318,611
Gandhi vs. Martin Luther King Jr.	February 25, 2013	101,885,916
Nikola Tesla vs. Thomas Edison	March 11, 2013	50,244,841
Babe Ruth vs. Lance Armstrong	March 25, 2013	39,366,468
Mozart vs. Skrillex	April 8, 2013	110,032,353
Rasputin vs. Stalin	April 22, 2013	142,467,165
Hitler vs. Vader 3	October 7, 2013	54,158,111
Blackbeard vs. Al Capone	October 21, 2013	61,625,842
Miley Cyrus vs. Joan of Arc	November 4, 2013	83,811,340
Bob Ross vs. Pablo Picasso	November 18, 2013	43,248,489
Michael Jordan vs. Muhammad Ali	December 3, 2013	63,220,764
Donald Trump vs. Ebenezer Scrooge	December 19, 2013	47,787,017
Rick Grimes vs. Walter White	May 5, 2014	83,040,304
Goku vs. Superman	May 19, 2014	96,049,723
Stephen King vs. Edgar Allan Poe	June 2, 2014	66,906,654
Sir Isaac Newton vs. Bill Nye	June 16, 2014	79,763,732
George Washington vs. William Wallace	June 30, 2014	53,168,877
Artists vs. TMNT	July 14, 2014	103,871,466
Ghostbusters vs. MythBusters	November 10, 2014	59,976,942
Romeo and Juliet vs. Bonnie and Clyde	November 17, 2014	56,386,831
Zeus vs. Thor	November 24, 2014	44,890,968
Jack the Ripper vs. Hannibal Lecter	December 1, 2014	63,668,727
Oprah vs. Ellen	December 8, 2014	45,155,123
Steven Spielberg vs. Alfred Hitchcock	December 15, 2014	84,188,204
Lewis and Clark vs. Bill and Ted	May 25, 2015	26,557,834
David Copperfield vs. Harry Houdini	June 8, 2015	20,704,623
Terminator vs. RoboCop	June 22, 2015	51,997,421
Eastern vs. Western Philosophers	July 6, 2015	75,657,900
Shaka Zulu vs. Julius Caesar	July 20, 2015	50,661,072
Jim Henson vs. Stan Lee	August 3, 2015	50,851,159
Deadpool vs. Boba Fett	December 16, 2015	89,990,648
J. R. R. Tolkien vs. George R. R. Martin	May 2, 2016	47,362,051
Gordon Ramsay vs. Julia Child	May 18, 2016	51,423,884
Frederick Douglass vs. Thomas Jefferson	May 30, 2016	34,613,513
James Bond vs. Austin Powers	June 14, 2016	67,789,836
Bruce Banner vs. Bruce Jenner	June 29, 2016	20,534,224
Alexander the Great vs. Ivan the Terrible	July 12, 2016	68,100,916
Donald Trump vs. Hillary Clinton	October 26, 2016	110,323,617
Ash Ketchum vs. Charles Darwin	November 14, 2016	35,679,995
Wonder Woman vs. Stevie Wonder	November 28, 2016	37,704,791
Tony Hawk vs. Wayne Gretzky	December 12, 2016	20,355,867
Theodore Roosevelt vs. Winston Churchill	December 26, 2016	58,155,527
Nice Peter vs. EpicLLOYD 2	January 9, 2017	19,946,605
Elon Musk vs. Mark Zuckerberg	December 7, 2018	38,460,791
Freddy Krueger vs. Wolverine	April 20, 2019	20,874,187
Guy Fawkes vs. Che Guevara	May 5, 2019	30,700,670
Ronald McDonald vs. The Burger King	June 8, 2019	29,209,364
George Carlin vs. Richard Pryor	July 13, 2019	16,163,437
Jacques Cousteau vs. Steve Irwin	August 17, 2019	13,570,425
Mother Teresa vs. Sigmund Freud	September 22, 2019	17,625,841
Vlad the Impaler vs. Count Dracula	October 25, 2019	16,910,281
The Joker vs. Pennywise	November 23, 2019	47,952,413
Thanos vs. J. Robert Oppenheimer	December 18, 2019	36,892,358
Donald Trump vs. Joe Biden	October 24, 2020	35,470,203
Harry Potter vs. Luke Skywalker	December 5, 2020	20,058,580
Ragnar Lodbrok vs. Richard The Lionheart	June 14, 2021	10,478,371
Jeff Bezos vs. Mansa Musa	November 27, 2021	10,474,633
John Wick vs. John Rambo vs. John McClane	December 18, 2021	14,354,972
Lara Croft vs. Indiana Jones	October 25, 2022	9,648,897
Henry Ford vs. Karl Marx	December 1, 2023	10,399,268
Godzilla vs. King Kong	February 23, 2024	8,135,079
Donald Trump vs. Kamala Harris	October 26, 2024	9,135,118
Napoleon vs. Charlemagne	February 12, 2025	3,732,993
Red Baron vs White Death	December 12, 2025	3,570,454
Tom Cruise vs Evel Knievel	August 21, 2026	1,019,495
Total	as of August 24, 2026	5,367,743,917 (as of August 24, 2026)
