= Mike O'Hearn =

American actor, trainer and bodybuilder

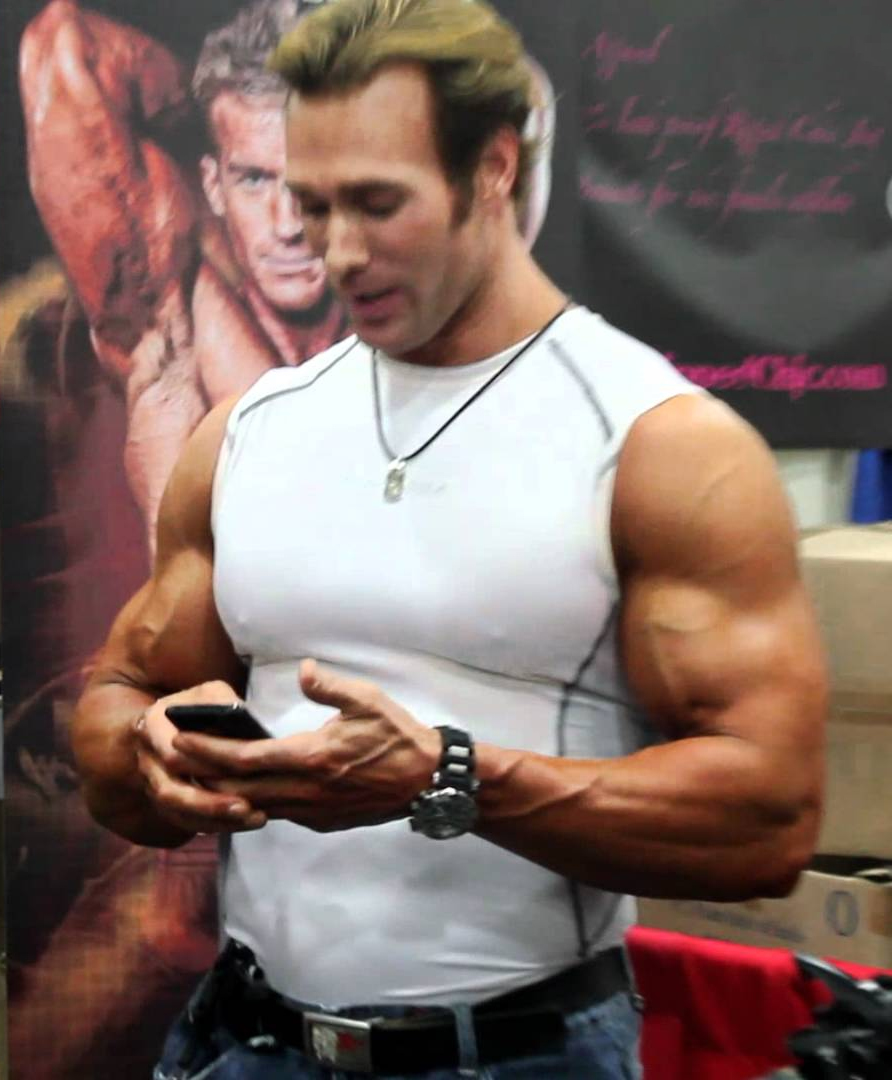
- Born: Michael O'Hearn; January 26, 1969 (age 57); Kirkland, Washington, U.S.
- Occupations: Bodybuilder; actor; personal trainer; model
- Years active: 1992–present
- Height: 6 ft 1 in (185 cm)
- Website: mikeohearn.com

Michael O'Hearn (born January 26, 1969) is an American bodybuilder, actor, personal trainer and model. He has been featured on over 400 magazine covers.

== Early life and education ==
Michael O'Hearn was born in Kirkland, Washington, on January 26, 1969. He played football at Juanita High School and was coached under Chuck Tarbox.

== Career ==
From 1999 to 2001, O'Hearn played Michael O'Dell on the American Gladiators-like show Battle Dome. In 2008, O'Hearn appeared as the gladiator Titan on the revival of American Gladiators, making him the only individual to appear on the original series, in which he played the gladiator Thor, and the revival series. In 2008, he made a guest appearance on the NBC soap opera Days of Our Lives as a bartender, and reprised his role of Titan on an episode of NBC's Celebrity Family Feud with fellow gladiators Jet, Venom, and Wolf.

In February 2009, he made a guest appearance as a cage fighter in episode 14 of NBC's Knight Rider revival. In 2011, he appeared in season 7 of It's Always Sunny in Philadelphia, playing Mac's "avatar" in the episode "How Mac Got Fat". That same year, he played a bodybuilder in the Workaholics episode "Muscle I'd Like to Flex". In 2012, O'Hearn self-produced and starred in the 7-episode action sci-fi thriller, Alter Ego.

In 2016, O'Hearn portrayed Marvel Comics character The Hulk in a season 5 episode of webseries Epic Rap Battles of History where he rapped against media personality and former athlete Caitlyn Jenner, portrayed by Nice Peter and Jolie "NoShame" Drake. In July 2022, Hearn was cast as bodybuilder Brad Vanderhorn, the idol of Killian Maddox (Jonathan Majors) in Magazine Dreams. In 2023, he portrayed the father of a bodybuilder contestant in episode 14 of the 6th season of 9-1-1 In 2024, O'Hearn appeared in Kesha's music video for the song "Joyride".

In 2023, O'Hearn became an internet meme on the social media platform TikTok in a short video with the song "What Is Love" by Haddaway slowed and reverbed.

== Personal life ==
O'Hearn has eight siblings.
