= Darth Vader vs. Hitler =

Single by Nice Peter & EpicLLOYD

from the album Epic Rap Battles of History season 1
- Released: November 10, 2010
- Label: Maker Studios
- Songwriters: Peter Shukoff; Lloyd Leonard Ahlquist

Nice Peter & EpicLLOYD singles chronology
"John Lennon vs. Bill O'Reilly" (2010)	"Darth Vader vs. Hitler" (2010)	"Abe Lincoln vs. Chuck Norris" (2010)

"Darth Vader vs. Hitler" is a song by Nice Peter and EpicLLOYD and the second episode overall on the YouTube series Epic Rap Battles of History. The song is the first installment of the Darth Vader vs. Hitler trilogy (alternately titled Hitler vs. Vader) and was featured in the first season of Epic Rap Battles of History. It was first released on YouTube on November 10, 2010, and later released on streaming services on January 26, 2012.

== Background ==
After the release of the first video in the series, the audience started to heavily influence the matchups, with "Vader vs. Hitler" being one of them. The song features a rap battle between fictional Star Wars character Darth Vader (voiced by Nice Peter) and German dictator Adolf Hitler (voiced by EpicLLOYD).

== Reception ==
"Darth Vader vs. Hitler" became an early viral hit, surpassing 100 million views on YouTube. This led the channel to popularity. Vader vs. Hitler has been a key recurring matchup in the Epic Rap Battle of History series, making two sequels.

== Certifications ==
Certifications for "Darth Vader vs. Hitler"
Region	Certification	Certified units/sales
United States (RIAA)	Gold	500,000^{^}
^{‡} Sales+streaming figures based on certification alone.
