= Biden vs. Trump =

Biden vs. Trump may refer to one of two United States presidential elections involving Joe Biden and Donald Trump:

- 2020 United States presidential election, won by Joe Biden against Donald Trump
- 2024 United States presidential election, with Biden as the presumptive Democratic nominee for much of the election cycle until July 2024

== See also ==
- 2020 United States presidential debates
- 2024 United States presidential debates
- Barack Obama vs. Mitt Romney (video)
