= Gabe Michael =

American AI filmmaker

- Born: Gabriel Michael
- Education: University of California, Los Angeles (MFA),
- Occupations: AI filmmaker, creative technologist
- Known for: Epic Rap Battles of History
- Website: gabemichael.ai

Gabe Michael is an American AI filmmaker, creative technologist, producer, director and writer, and best known as a former member of the Epic Rap Battles of History crew. Michael was awarded the International Academy of Web Television Award for his work as the producer of the Technium series.

== Education ==
Michael holds an MFA from the University of California, Los Angeles's Producers Program and an undergraduate degree in Film & Electronic Art from California State University, Long Beach.

== Career ==
Michael worked as a producer at the now-defunct digital media company Break Media and at Maker Studios, where he oversaw the Epic Rap Battles of History vertical.

During his time with Epic Rap Battles of History, Michael served as the producer for several episodes, including Master Chief vs Leonidas, Mario Bros vs Wright Bros, and Michael Jackson vs Elvis Presley, and the associate producer for Cleopatra vs Marilyn Monroe, and helped to produce Dis Raps For Hire.

In 2013, Michael co-founded Forge Apollo, a digital production company where he served as its executive producer and director. In March 2014, Forge Apollo created the digital series Technium which was hosted by YouTuber Lana McKissack. Michael received the 2015 IAWTV Award in the Best Writing (Non-Fiction) category for his work on Technium.

In 2015, Forge Apollo created the short horror film Diary of a Psychopath. The film was written by Daniel P. Coughlin and directed by Michael, and released by Eli Roth's Crypt TV. In the same year, Michael directed the Evolution of the Bikini Viral Video for Hyatt's Breathless Resorts & Spas brand. In May 2015, The Huffington Post's style section covered the Evolution of the Bikini in an article titled "WATCH: 100 Years Of Bikinis In Under 2 Minutes." which highlighted how the short showcases a century of women's swimwear, modeled by Amanda Cerny. The video was also featured by media outlets, including Harper's Bazaar and Cosmopolitan.

In 2016, the Forge Apollo YouTube channel screened the animated comedy Cubicle Zombies, co-created by Michael, Adam Jones, and Adam Weinstock.

In 2023, Michael wrote, directed, and edited Midnight Television, a sci-fi short that blends 1980s nostalgia, emerging 1990s tech, and today's internet culture to explore themes of loneliness. In June 2024, Michael's AI short Let Us Explore, which utilizes AI in a unique form, was screened at the Tribeca Film Festival, and won Best Character at Runway's Gen:48 Second AI Film Competitions.

Michael currently serves as the Vice President and Executive Producer of AI at Edelman.

== Filmography ==
Title	Year	Role	Notes	Refs
Eric and His Trident	2006	Producer	Short	
Drive Around Town	2007	First assistant director	Short	
Atascadero	2007	Assistant director	Short	
Smooch	2008	Producer	Short	
The Big Time Show	2008	Co-executive producer	TV Series	
Epic Rap Battles of History	2012	Producer		
Speakeasy: With Paul F. Tompkins	2012	Producer	TV Series	
Dis Raps for Hire	2012	Producer	TV Series	
Rendezvous	2013	Line producer		
Man at Arms	2013	Producer	TV Series - 6 episodes	
The Screen Junkies Show	2013	Producer	TV Series	
Technium	2014	Director - Editor - Writer	TV Series	
Diary of a Psychopath	2015	Director	Short	
Ambient	2015	Director	TV Mini Series	
Cubicle Zombies	2016	Co-producer	Animated comedy	
Foodz	2018	Director - Writer	TV Mini Series	
Style Sector	2018	Director - Writer - Editor	TV Series	
James Patterson's The Chef	2018	Director	TV Mini Series	
Will.i.am Invites You to Take a Trip with Him to the Future	2018	Director	Short	
Missing	2019	Director - Editor	Short	
Sony's Impossible Science	2021	Producer, Editor, Director	TV Series	
Midnight Television	2022	Director - Writer - Editor	Short	
Alexanderthetitan	2023	Story producer	TV Mini Series	
