= Zach Sherwin =

American screenwriter (born 1980)

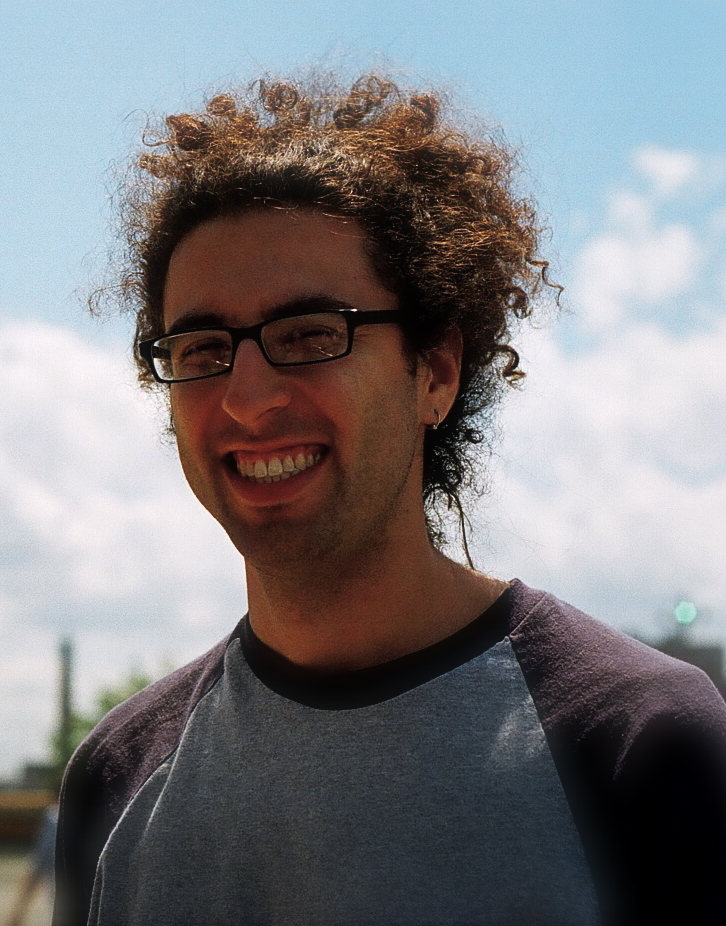
- Sherwin in 2009
- Born: July 1, 1980 (age 46); East Cleveland, Ohio, U.S.
- Other name: Mr. Napkins
- Education: Brandeis University
- Occupations: Comedian; rapper; writer; actor
- Website: zachsherwin.com

Zachary James Sherwin (born July 1, 1980) is an American comedian, rapper, writer, and actor best known for writing for and performing in the Epic Rap Battles of History YouTube series, as well as writing for Crazy Ex-Girlfriend on The CW. He specializes in comedic rap. He previously performed with The Late Night Players under the stage name "MC Mr. Napkins".

== Early life and education ==
Sherwin was born on July 1, 1980, to a Jewish family in East Cleveland, Ohio, and raised in Cincinnati, Ohio, and southwest Missouri. His mother was a rabbi and has said he feels deeply connected to his Jewish identity.

In high school, Sherwin took debate which he credits delving into hip hop. He attended college at Brandeis University and graduated in 2002. At Brandeis, Sherwin became an Ethics Center Student Fellow (known as the Sorensen Fellowship since 2009) while interning at Ikamva Labantu in Cape Town, South Africa. While in college, Sherwin started a sketch comedy group, The Late Night Players. His fellow members included Andrew Slack and Seth Reibstein, founders of the Harry Potter Alliance, and Aaron Kagan.

== Career ==
Sherwin continued to perform with The Late Night Players after graduating from Brandeis until the group's dissolution in 2007. The group was the subject of a documentary directed by Joshua Goren which screened at the November 2006 New York International Independent Film and Video Festival.

Sherwin began to perform solo as MC Mr. Napkins in Boston from 2007 until giving up the name completely in 2013 in a video posted to his YouTube channel. As a solo comedian, Sherwin has performed multiple times at the Knitting Factory. He has appeared in multiple shows at UCB. Sherwin appeared on the debut episode of Cameron Esposito's Aspecialthing-produced stand-up comedy podcast Put Your Hands Together.

Sherwin was one of the original performers involved with the Epic Rap Battles of History YouTube series. As of May 2024, he has appeared in eleven episodes, having portrayed Albert Einstein, Emmett Brown, Sherlock Holmes, Ebenezer Scrooge, Stephen King, Egon Spengler, Voltaire, Walt Disney, Alexander the Great, Wayne Gretzky, and John Wick. Along with co-creators Peter Shukoff and Lloyd Ahlquist, Sherwin has written for episodes in every season of the series and has acted in every season except season 6. In 2014, the series won a Streamy Award for Best Writing. In 2015, the series was nominated for the same award. In 2016, the series was nominated for Streamy Awards for Best Collaboration and Best Writing.

From 2015 to 2017, Sherwin worked as a songwriter for the CW series Crazy Ex-Girlfriend. He co-wrote the songs "JAP Battle", "JAP Battle (Reprise)", "I Give Good Parent", and "So Maternal". The first season of the series was nominated for multiple awards and holds a 96% positive rating on Rotten Tomatoes.

Sherwin auditioned for season 11 of America's Got Talent in 2016. His performance in the Judge Cuts round was televised but he did not proceed to the Quarterfinals round.

Sherwin writes, produces, and hosts a series of live crossword puzzle comedy shows entitled The Crossword Show, in which three panelists race to solve a crossword puzzle on stage. The shows include comedy raps, videos, and humorous facts prepared for each clue. The format is similar to NPR's Wait Wait... Don't Tell Me!. Notable guest solvers have included Mayim Bialik, Pete Holmes, Rachel Bloom, Lisa Loeb, Josh Gondelman, and Aparna Nancherla.

== Personal life ==
Sherwin lives in Los Angeles, California, having moved there in 2010. He is a vegan.

== Discography ==
=== Studio albums ===
List of albums
Title	Album details	Singles
The Album (as MC Mr. Napkins)	Released: November 30, 2010; Label: Comedy Central Records (#CCR0112); Format: digital download	Pro/con (released February 1, 2012); Wu Beatles (released March 26, 2012); F-Bombs (released July 29, 2012)
Rap!	Released: June 9, 2015; Label: Aspecialthing Records; Format: CD, digital download	
Songs You Need To See The Video For	Released: September 6, 2016; Label: Independent; Format: digital download	
Brutus	Released: September 6, 2016; Label: Independent; Format: digital download	

== Filmography ==
Year	Title	Role	Notes
2011–present	Epic Rap Battles of History	Writer, various roles	Acted in 11 episodes
2013	Totally Biased with W. Kamau Bell	Himself	1 episode (S01E26)
2013	Dis Raps For Hire	Himself	1 episode (S02E03 "Nelson, Mark, Steven and Lucas")
2014	The Pete Holmes Show	Himself	1 episode (S01E64 May 8, 2014)
2015–2019	Crazy Ex-Girlfriend	Writer	
2016	America's Got Talent	Himself	
