= Barack Obama vs. Mitt Romney (song) =

Single by Epic Rap Battles of History
- Released: October 15, 2012
- Genre: Battle rap
- Length: 3:08
- Label: Maker Studios
- Songwriters: Peter Shukoff, Lloyd Ahlquist
- Producers: Michlle Maloney, Drew Walkup

Epic Rap Battles of History singles chronology
"Frank Sinatra vs. Freddie Mercury" (2012)	"Barack Obama vs. Mitt Romney" (2012)	"Doc Brown vs. Doctor Who" (2012)

Music video
- Barack Obama vs Mitt Romney. Epic Rap Battles of History Season 2. on YouTube

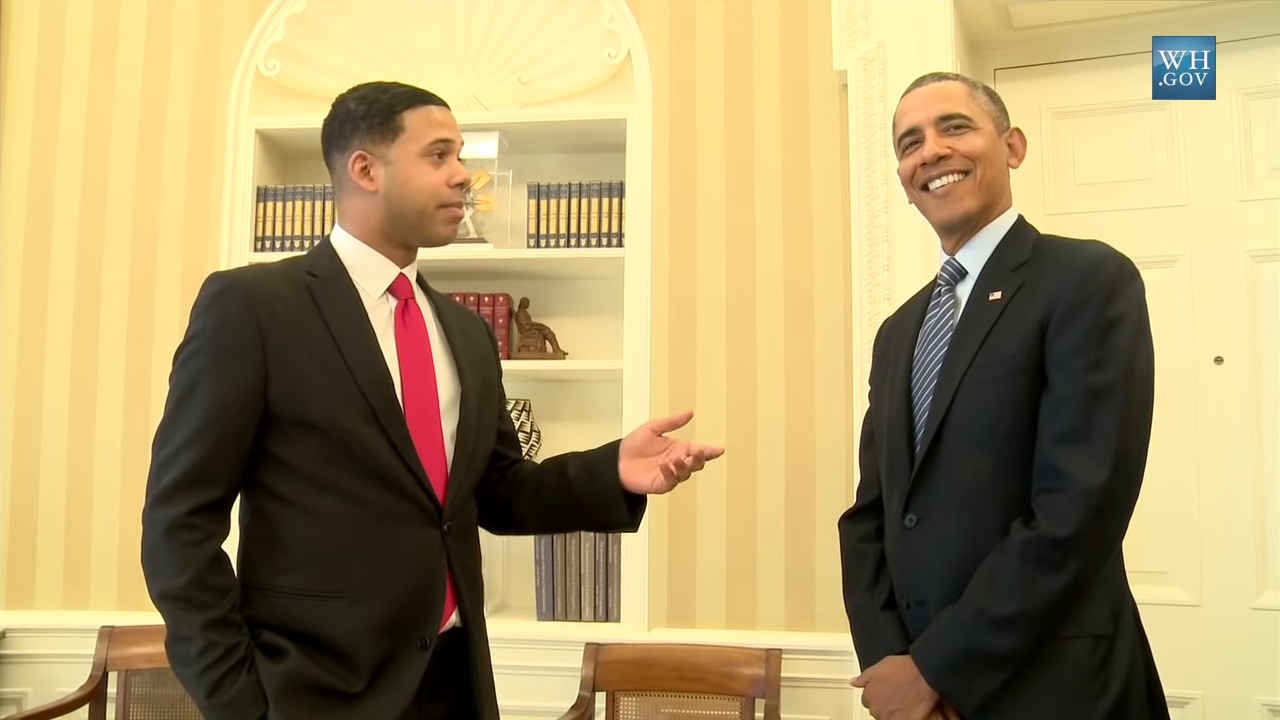
Iman Crosson (left, in character) portrayed and rapped as Barack Obama (right).

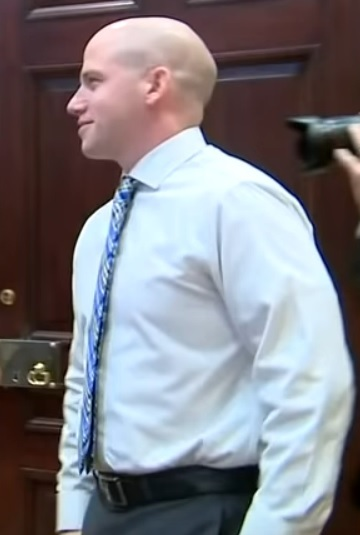
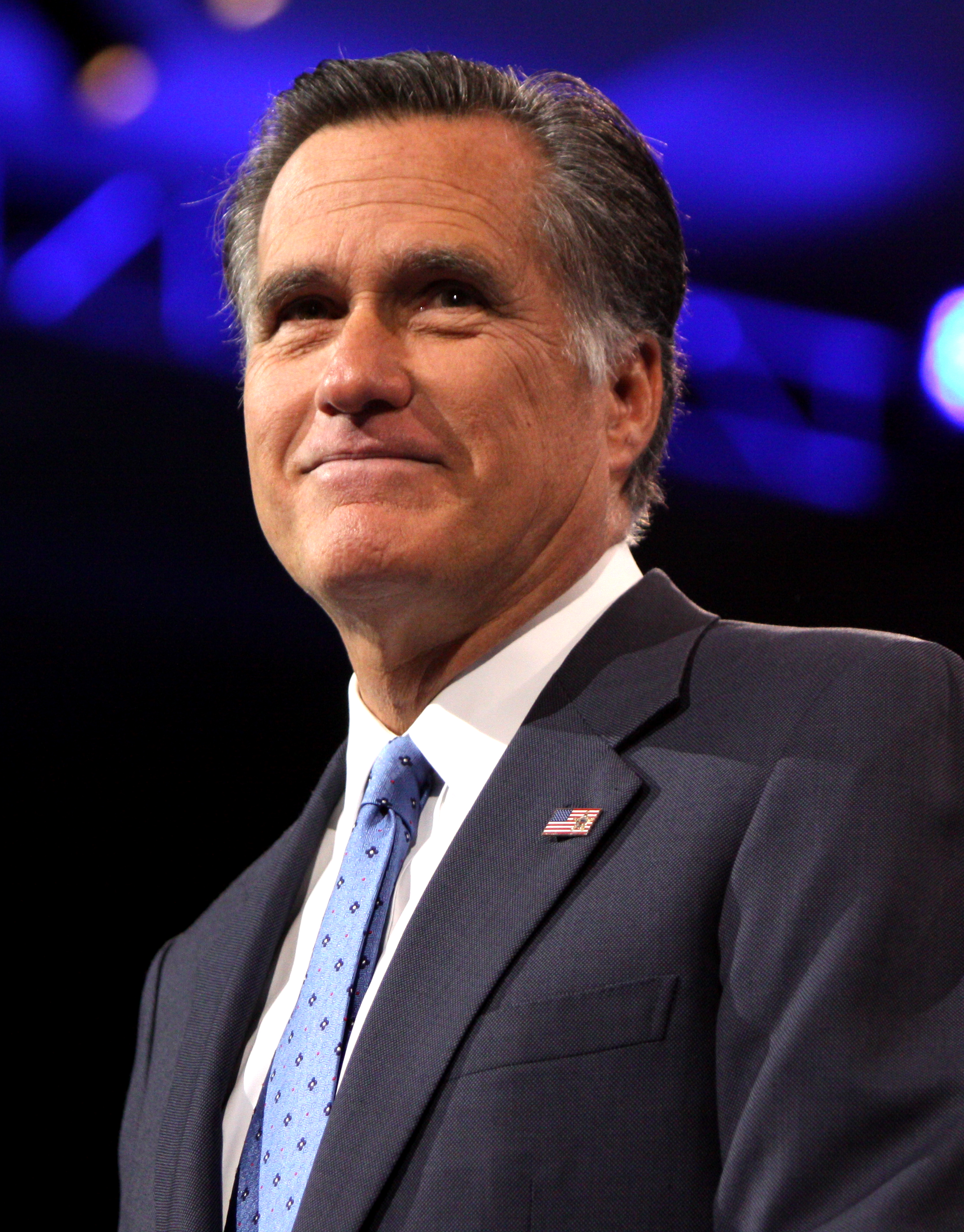
Lloyd Ahlquist (left) portrayed and rapped as Mitt Romney (right).
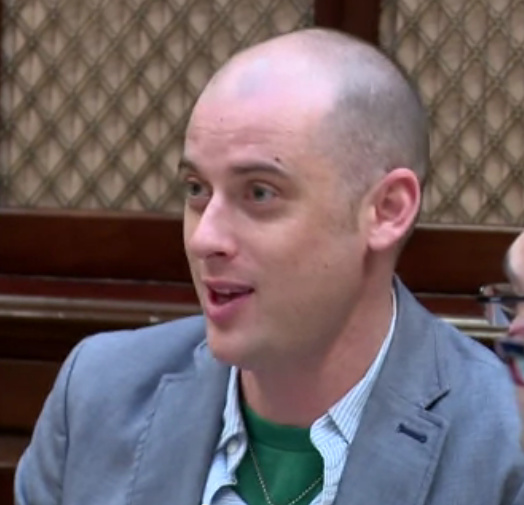
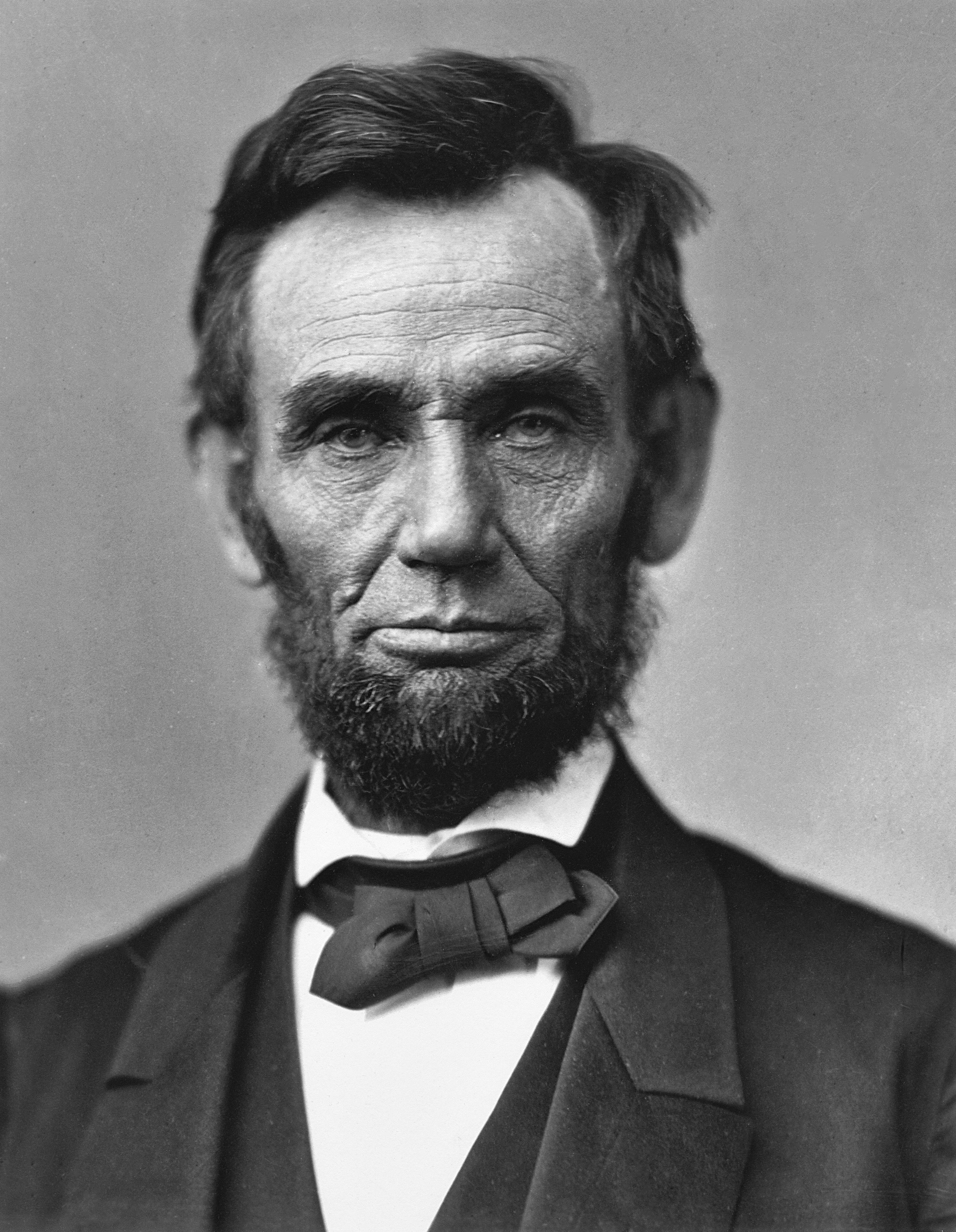
Peter Shukoff (left) reprised his portrayal of and rapping as Abraham Lincoln (right).

"Barack Obama vs. Mitt Romney" is a song and music video, performed by Iman "Alphacat" Crosson, Peter "Nice Peter" Shukoff, and Lloyd "EpicLLOYD" Ahlquist. It is the 8th episode of the 2nd season of the YouTube video series Epic Rap Battles of History. The video was released on October 15, 2012 on the show's YouTube channel in anticipation of the 2012 U.S. presidential election.

== Music video ==
The video features then-President of the United States Barack Obama (portrayed by Iman Crosson) and former Governor of Massachusetts Mitt Romney (portrayed by Lloyd Ahlquist) facing off in a rap battle. Romney raps first, Obama second; following four back-and-forth verses, former President Abraham Lincoln (portrayed by Peter Shukoff) interrupts the two and begins rapping against both Obama and Romney (Lincoln had previously appeared in the first season of the series, battling Chuck Norris). Lincoln proceeds to "bitch smack" the two before being carried away by an American bald eagle.

As of December 2025, the video has received over 164 million views and 1.3 million likes on YouTube and is currently the most-viewed episode of the series.

== Legacy ==
Three spiritual sequels to the battle, "Donald Trump vs. Hillary Clinton", "Donald Trump vs. Joe Biden", and "Donald Trump vs. Kamala Harris" were made in correspondence with the 2016, 2020, and 2024 presidential elections respectively. This became an ERB tradition that has been maintained every election since. Abraham Lincoln returns in the 2016 battle as a third party rapper. "Donald Trump vs. Joe Biden" did not feature a third-party rapper, while the 2024 battle features Theodore Roosevelt as a third-party rapper.

== Reception ==
The video was one of the most popular viral videos of 2012 and was discussed in a New York Times article.

=== Awards and nominations ===
The video was nominated for "Video of the Year" at the 2013 YouTube Music Awards but lost to Girls' Generation song "I Got a Boy".

== Certifications ==
In July 2013, the song was certified Gold by the RIAA, making ERB the first YouTube channel to do so.

Region	Certification	Certified units/sales
United States (RIAA)	Gold	500,000^{‡}
^{‡} Sales+streaming figures based on certification alone.
