= Epic Rap Battles of History =

YouTube video series

- Genre: Comedy hip hop; Battle rap; Nerdcore
- Created by: Nice Peter; EpicLLOYD
- Directed by: Dave McCary; Jackson Adams; Daniel M. Turcan; Forrest Whaley; Peter Shukoff; Mike Betette; Lloyd Ahlquist
- Country of origin: United States
- Original language: English
- No. of seasons: 7
- No. of episodes: 92 (list of episodes)

Production
- Executive producers: Peter Shukoff; Lloyd Ahlquist
- Running time: 1–5 minutes
- Production companies: Maker Studios (1–5); Independent (6–pres.)

Original release
- Network: YouTube
- Release: September 26, 2010 – present

Epic Rap Battles of History (ERB) is a YouTube web series and music project created by Peter "Nice Peter" Shukoff and Lloyd "EpicLLOYD" Ahlquist. The series pits historical and pop culture figures against one another in a rap battle format. The characters portrayed are often determined by suggestions from viewers in the comments sections of the channel's videos. Shukoff and Ahlquist write each song themselves, researching the subject in order to find obscure details to use as references in the lyrics, although guest stars featured in the battles as well as certain Patreon subscribers have also contributed to the writing process. Following an extended hiatus, the channel returned with a bonus battle in December 2018, and the sixth season debuted on April 20, 2019. As of August 24, 2026, the channel has 15.1 million subscribers and approximately 4.34 billion total video views.

The popularity of the music videos has led to mainstream partnerships, such as with Ubisoft, using the "Blackbeard vs. Al Capone" episode to promote Assassin's Creed IV: Black Flag. Additionally, "Terminator vs. Robocop" in the fourth season was used to promote the upcoming release of the film Terminator Genisys and featured an appearance by Arnold Schwarzenegger. ERB's popularity has also led to collaboration with mainstream artists. Shukoff and Ahlquist also created a two-minute rap battle scene used in The SpongeBob Movie: Sponge Out of Water.

Although early episodes of the series featured only Shukoff and Ahlquist, later episodes have regularly featured guest appearances from internet celebrities including Dan Bull, Lisa Donovan, Timothy DeLaGhetto, George Watsky, DeStorm Power, Jesse Wellens, PewDiePie, Jenna Marbles, Lilly Singh, Ray William Johnson, Rhett & Link, and Smosh. Media celebrities like musicians Snoop Dogg, Chali 2na, T-Pain, Jackie Tohn and "Weird Al" Yankovic, actors J. B. Smoove and Gary Anthony Williams, and the comedy duo Keegan-Michael Key and Jordan Peele have also appeared in the series.

On July 3, 2013, "Barack Obama vs. Mitt Romney" became the first of its singles to be certified Gold by the Recording Industry Association of America (RIAA) in the United States. 10 other singles, "Darth Vader vs. Hitler", "Albert Einstein vs. Stephen Hawking", "Dr. Seuss vs. William Shakespeare", "Master Chief vs. Leonidas", "Steve Jobs vs. Bill Gates", "Justin Bieber vs. Ludwig van Beethoven", "Mario Brothers vs. Wright Brothers", "Mr. T vs. Mr. Rogers", "Abe Lincoln vs. Chuck Norris", and "Darth Vader vs. Hitler 2", were subsequently certified Gold as well.

== History ==
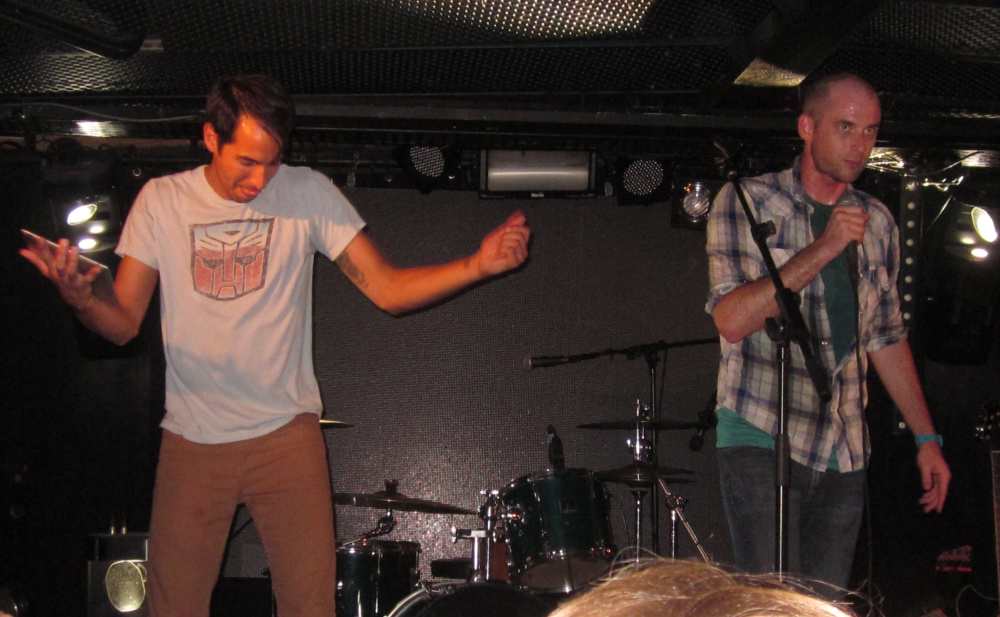
Dante Cimadamore (left) and Peter Shukoff (right)

The idea for historical figures rapping against each other was conceived by Ahlquist, who pitched the idea to Shukoff as an improvised show titled "Check OneTwo"; both were working in improv at the time along with Zach Sherwin, who would later become a regular guest on the series. They were met with high levels of difficulty at first and decided that the concept would fare much better as a YouTube series than an improv show. The first three rap battles were each shot on a $50 budget.

Before the web series existed on YouTube, Shukoff and Ahlquist recorded their first song, which was a battle between Child's Play antagonist Chucky and actor Michael J. Fox. The song was freestyle and poorly made; as a result, it was not released to the public.

On September 22, 2010, the first rap battle was uploaded to YouTube, featuring Shukoff as John Lennon and Ahlquist as Bill O'Reilly under the title "Bill O'Reilly Flips Out on John Lennon" before being re-uploaded on September 26, 2010, under the Epic Rap Battles of History title. The 15th episode, "Nice Peter vs. EpicLLOYD", marked the end of the first season. This battle pitted Ahlquist and Shukoff against each other with cameos from all of the characters they had played over the 14 prior episodes. At the end of the battle, KassemG arrives and convinces Peter and Lloyd to continue the battles on their own channel. Epic Rap Battles of History later returned on December 8, 2011, hosted on their new channel (moving from Shukoff's personal channel), ERB, with behind-the-scenes videos on their second channel, ERB2. Both channels were created in 2006, however it's unknown what they were used for until 2011, as the oldest video on ERB is from 2011, and the Wayback Machine's earliest record of the ERB and ERB2 channels is from November 2011, when they were called ERB's Channel and ERB2's Channel, respectively. Shukoff and Maker Studios also created the official website for the series, where fans could vote on winners for each video, and read short comical autobiographies by each character.

On September 27, 2012, following a four-month pause after the "Steve Jobs vs. Bill Gates" episode, a video was released on the series' YouTube channel where Ahlquist (voicing to an animation of Theodore Roosevelt) announced that new episodes would be released every two weeks until the Christmas holidays, starting with the 22nd episode "Frank Sinatra vs. Freddie Mercury" (aired on October 1, 2012). Two weeks later, the first election rap battle, Barack Obama vs. Mitt Romney, aired based on the 2012 United States Presidential Election. It is also the most viewed rap battle as of June 2026 with over 164 million views. The video "Moses vs. Santa Claus", aired on December 10, 2012, which was the last battle before taking a break for the holidays.

On February 17, 2013, Epic Rap Battles of History was nominated for five Streamy Awards, winning four of them. Shukoff and Ahlquist also performed part of the "Steve Jobs vs. Bill Gates" battle live.

On September 9, 2013, ERB uploaded a trailer video on their channel announcing that Epic Rap Battles of History would return on October 7, 2013, for a third season. On October 14, ERB released a second video with Ahlquist voicing Theodore Roosevelt, who announced the upcoming season's schedule. The third season went on hiatus after the release of "Donald Trump vs. Ebenezer Scrooge" on December 19, 2013. In March 2014, an episode of Shukoff's weekly show The Monday Show, published on March 11, and a third announcement video of Epic Rap Battles of History News, published on March 18, confirmed that Season 3 would continue on May 5. "Weird" Al Yankovic, Smosh, and Rhett and Link were also confirmed as guest appearances. The third season concluded on July 14 with the release of "Artists vs. TMNT", depicting the Teenage Mutant Ninja Turtles Leonardo, Donatello, Raphael, and Michelangelo in a battle against Leonardo, Donatello, Raphael, and Michelangelo.

On September 30, 2014, a teaser video for the fourth season of Epic Rap Battles of History, featuring the Ghostbusters and MythBusters, was released; the series returned on November 10, 2014, with its 46th episode, "Ghostbusters vs. Mythbusters". This season also marked the first animated battle: "Zeus vs. Thor", which was animated entirely with Lego bricks and minifigures; Forrest Whaley served as animation director. On December 15, 2014, when "Steven Spielberg vs. Alfred Hitchcock" was released, the fourth season went on hiatus. The season continued on May 25, 2015, and concluded with the release of the season finale, "Jim Henson vs. Stan Lee", on August 3, 2015.

It was confirmed in a podcast by Shukoff that there would be a fifth season, with pre-production starting in November 2015 once they came back from the world tour.

On December 16, the first off-season battle was released, entitled, "Deadpool vs. Boba Fett."

On February 26, 2016, it was announced that Season 5 would begin on May 2, 2016, and on March 22 it was announced that production had begun.

Season 5 officially began on May 2, 2016, with the release of the first battle of the season, "George R. R. Martin vs. J. R. R. Tolkien". ERB released battles every other Monday as of the first half of Season 5. On July 12, 2016, "Alexander the Great vs. Ivan the Terrible" was released. This marked the midseason break. Ahlquist later confirmed they were planning to return mid to late October. Filming began for the second half of Season 5 on September 23. On October 26, Season 5 resumed with "Donald Trump vs. Hillary Clinton". The final episode of Season 5, "Nice Peter vs. EpicLLOYD 2" was released on January 9, 2017, where Ahlquist and Shukoff battle against each other once again, as it is a sequel to the Season 1 finale. Following the fifth season, ERB went on an extended hiatus.

In 2016, Epic Rap Battles of History was nominated for an Emmy Award in the newly initiated category Primetime Emmy Award for Outstanding Short Form Variety Series at the 68th Primetime Emmy Awards.

In 2018, Shukoff announced there would be a sixth season during a performance at Anime Midwest. On November 30, 2018, a video was posted on the official ERB YouTube channel, confirming that Season 6 would premiere in 2019. A "bonus battle" between Elon Musk and Mark Zuckerberg was released on December 7, 2018. In December 2018, Ahlquist said that they had gone "fully independent" of their production company.

On April 20, 2019, the Season 6 premiere ("Freddy Krueger vs. Wolverine") was released. ERB once again went on hiatus in December, after "Thanos vs. J. Robert Oppenheimer". After a 10-month hiatus, ERB returned, with their third election rap battle, "Donald Trump vs. Joe Biden". On December 5, 2020, Ahlquist stated in a Behind The Scenes video for their next battle, "Harry Potter vs. Luke Skywalker" (their second Lego-animated collaboration with Forrest Whaley), that as a result of the COVID-19 pandemic, ERB would be transitioning from Season 6 to Season 7 earlier than expected, rather than further postpone Season 6. Several planned battles and concepts would be holdovers from Season 6.

On May 28, 2021, the ERB Twitter account announced a new episode to be released on June 14, featuring EpicLLOYD as legendary Viking hero Ragnar Lodbrok and Nice Peter as English King Richard the Lionheart. The episode was sponsored by the video game Rise of Kingdoms. On November 27, 2021, ERB released a new rap battle episode, titled Jeff Bezos vs. Mansa Musa on their YouTube channel. This was followed by the first "three-way" battle in the show's history ("John Wick vs. John Rambo vs. John McClane") on December 18, 2021. The next episode, "Lara Croft vs. Indiana Jones", released on October 26, 2022, followed by "Henry Ford vs. Karl Marx" on December 1, 2023. The next episode, "Godzilla vs. King Kong", was released on February 23, 2024, being the first battle to use motion capture. The next episode, "Donald Trump vs. Kamala Harris", their fourth election rap battle, was released on October 26, 2024. The next episode, "Napoleon vs Charlemagne" was released on February 12, 2025. The next episode, "Red Baron vs White Death" was released on December 12, 2025. The next episode, "Tom Cruise vs Evel Knievel" was released on August 21, 2026.

== Format ==
Battles begin with a narrator speaking in a deep and somewhat unclear voice, first saying 'Epic Rap Battles of History' (in a mostly monotonous way; sometimes the "e" of "Epic" is longer in upwards glissandoing and this leads up into the rest being said as usual) while the logo appears on screen. The names of the contestants are then announced ('[CONTESTANT 1] vs. [CONTESTANT 2]') (the part announcing the name of the second contestant is in the same monotonous way), while the contestants and their names appear on screen. One contestant will rap against the other first, followed by the other, and so on. It is very common for many different 'clones' of the same contestant to appear while they are rapping. Different rap battles go on for different lengths of time, and some battles may only have two verses per contestant, especially earlier ones. The first 14 battles, except the 5th and 10th, only have 2 verses per contestant, while the 5th and 10th battles to be made (Hulk Hogan and Macho Man vs. Kim Jong Il and Billy Mays vs. Ben Franklin) have third party rappers entering after some time, but still have a total of 4 verses only. Many rap battles feature a third party rapper entering the battle after some time, and as many as ten rappers have entered a battle (in "Ghostbusters vs. Mythbusters"). When the battle concludes, the narrator asks the viewer who they think won and who should appear next, followed by the credits.

== Cast ==
The two creators of the series (EpicLLOYD and Nice Peter) portray the majority of the fictional and historical characters featured. Zach Sherwin is the most common guest-rapper, having portrayed eleven characters across six of the seven seasons of the series. George Watsky portrayed one character in each of the first three seasons, namely William Shakespeare, the Fourth Doctor, and Edgar Allan Poe. DeStorm Power has also portrayed three characters, being Mr. T, Kanye West, and Shaka Zulu.

The online creator duo Rhett & Link have portrayed three characters each, including the Wright brothers, Meriwether Lewis and William Clark, and Donatello and Leonardo da Vinci.

The comedy duo Key & Peele have portrayed opposing figures in "Gandhi vs. Martin Luther King Jr." and "Michael Jordan vs. Muhammad Ali".

Other people with two appearances throughout the series include Kimmy Gatewood, Timothy DeLaGhetto, Ray William Johnson, Dan Bull, KRNFX, and Wax.

List of cast members
Cast member	Appearances		Seasons										
Cast member	Appearances		1	2	3	4	B	5	B	F	6	C	7
EpicLLOYD	96	various Characters: Bill O'Reilly, Adolf Hitler, Chuck Norris, "Macho Man" Randy Savage, Genghis Khan, Napoleon Bonaparte, Benjamin Franklin, Gandalf, Thing 1 and Thing 2, James T. Kirk, John McCain, Johann Sebastian Bach, Carl Sagan, Mr. McFeely, John "Hannibal" Smith, H. M. Murdock, Templeton "Faceman" Peck, Himself, Leonidas I (voice), Mario, Elvis Presley, Bill Gates, Frank Sinatra, Mitt Romney, Clint Eastwood, Robin, Christmas Elves, Adam, Thomas Edison, Babe Ruth, Skrillex, Joseph Stalin, Mikhail Gorbachev, Pleistarchus, Marlon Brando, Marty McFly, Al Capone, Pablo Picasso, J. P. Morgan, Walter White, Superman, William Wallace, Teenage Mutant Ninja Turtles (voices & portrayals), Lilly Truscott, Adam Savage, Stay Puft Marshmallow Man (voice), Clyde Barrow, Thor (voice), Hannibal Lecter, Alfred Hitchcock, Bill S. Preston Esq, Harry Houdini, The Terminator, Socrates, Stan Lee, Dr. Phil McGraw, Deadpool (voice), Elon Musk, Dianne Feinstein, Jean-Luc Picard, George R. R. Martin, Gordon Ramsay, James Bond (Sean Connery), Bruce Banner, The Hulk (voice), Frederick the Great, Donald Trump, Theodore Roosevelt, Ash Williams, Bobby Orr, PewDiePie, The Burger King, Larry Bird, Bill Clinton, Wolverine, Robin Williams, Steve Irwin, Vlad the Impaler, Pennywise, Thanos, Ragnar Lodbrok, Jeff Bezos, John McClane, Karl Marx, King Kong, Charlemagne, The White Death, Evel Knievel, Mutt Williams	Yes	Yes	Yes	Yes	Yes	Yes	Yes	Yes	Yes	Yes	Yes
Nice Peter	85	various Characters: John Lennon, Darth Vader, Abraham Lincoln, Lady Gaga, Hulk Hogan, Ludwig van Beethoven, Stephen Hawking, Easter Bunny, Napoleon Dynamite, Vince Offer, Albus Dumbledore, The Cat in the Hat, Mr. Rogers, Christopher Columbus, Himself, Master Chief, Luigi, Michael Jackson (adult), Steve Jobs, HAL 9000 (voice), Freddie Mercury, Tenth Doctor, Batman, Santa Claus, Nikola Tesla (voice), Lance Armstrong, Wolfgang Amadeus Mozart, Grigori Rasputin, Vladimir Lenin, Vladimir Putin, John F. Kennedy, Steve, Blackbeard, Bob Ross, Donald Trump, Ghost of Christmas Yet to Come, Rick Grimes, Bill Nye, George Washington, Teenage Mutant Ninja Turtles (voices), Jimmy Olsen, Krillin, Miley Stewart, Jamie Hyneman, Romeo Montague, Zeus (voice), Steven Spielberg, Michael Bay, Ted "Theodore" Logan, David Copperfield, RoboCop, Friedrich Nietzsche, Julius Caesar, Jim Henson, Kermit the Frog (voice), Billy the Kid, Boba Fett (voice), Mark Zuckerberg, J. R. R. Tolkien, Thomas Jefferson, Austin Powers, Bruce Jenner, Ivan the Terrible, Charles Darwin, Tony Hawk, T-Series, Ronald McDonald, Big Bird, Guy Fawkes, George Carlin, Jacques Cousteau, Sigmund Freud, Count Dracula, The Joker, J. Robert Oppenheimer, Joe Biden, Luke Skywalker (voice), Edward Scissorhands, Han Solo (voice), Yoda (voice), Richard the Lionheart, John Rambo, Indiana Jones, Henry Ford, Godzilla, Napoleon Bonaparte, The Red Baron, Raymond Babbitt	Yes	Yes	Yes	Yes	Yes	Yes	Yes	Yes	Yes	Yes	Yes
Zach Sherwin	11	various Characters: Albert Einstein, Dr. Emmett Brown, Sherlock Holmes, Ebenezer Scrooge, Stephen King, Egon Spengler, Voltaire, Walt Disney, Alexander the Great, Wayne Gretzky, John Wick	Yes	Yes	Yes	Yes		Yes					Yes
George Watsky	3	William Shakespeare; Fourth Doctor; Edgar Allan Poe	Yes	Yes	Yes								
DeStorm Power	3	Mr. T; Kanye West; Shaka Zulu	Yes		Yes	Yes							
Rhett McLaughlin	3	Wilbur Wright; Donatello; William Clark		Yes	Yes	Yes							
Link Neal	3	Orville Wright; Leonardo da Vinci; Meriwether Lewis		Yes	Yes	Yes							
Keegan-Michael Key	2	Mahatma Gandhi; Michael Jordan		Yes	Yes								
Jordan Peele	2	Martin Luther King Jr; Muhammad Ali		Yes	Yes								
Kimmy Gatewood	2	Marilyn Monroe; Hillary Clinton		Yes				Yes					
Timothy DeLaGhetto	2	Kim Jung-Il; Sun Tzu	Yes			Yes							
Ray William Johnson	2	Boba Fett (only voice); Goku			Yes								
Dan Bull	2	Jack the Ripper; Winston Churchill				Yes		Yes					
KRNFX	2	Grant Imahara; Lao Tzu				Yes							
Wax	2	Quentin Tarantino; Freddy Krueger				Yes					Yes		
Lisa Donovan	1	Sarah Palin	Yes										
Alex Farnham	1	Justin Bieber	Yes										
Colin J Sweeney	1	Billy Mays	Yes										
Mickey Meyer	1	Dr. Seuss (didn't rap)	Yes										
Jesse Wellens	1	Leonidas I (didn't voice)		Yes									
Bentley Green	1	Young Michael Jackson		Yes									
Angela Trimbur	1	Cleopatra		Yes									
Iman Crosson	1	Barack Obama		Yes									
Mike Diva	1	Bruce Lee		Yes									
Kyle Mooney	1	Dr. Watson		Yes									
Snoop Dogg	1	Moses		Yes									
Jenna Marbles	1	Eve		Yes									
Dante Cimadamore	1	Nikola Tesla (didn't voice)		Yes									
PewDiePie	1	Mikhail Baryshnikov (cameo)		Yes			Yes						
Atul Singh	1	Boba Fett (didn't voice)			Yes								
Brian Neunhoffer	1	Boba Fett (didn't voice)			Yes								
Michelle Glavan	1	Miley Cyrus			Yes								
Jessi Smile	1	Joan of Arc			Yes								
"Weird Al" Yankovic	1	Isaac Newton			Yes								
Chali 2na	1	Neil deGrasse Tyson			Yes								
Ian Hecox	1	Michelangelo			Yes								
Anthony Padilla	1	Raphael			Yes								
Mark Douglas	1	Raymond Stantz				Yes							
Chris Gorbos	1	Peter Venkman				Yes							
Walter Downing	1	Winston Zeddemore				Yes							
Taylor Cu	1	Stay Puft Marshmallow Man (didn't voice)				Yes							
Grace Helbig	1	Juliet Capulet				Yes							
Hannah Hart	1	Bonnie Parker				Yes							
Robert Hoffman	1	Deadpool (didn't voice)					Yes						
Ivan "Flipz" Velez	1	Boba Fett (didn't voice)					Yes						
Mamrie Hart	1	Julia Child						Yes					
J. B. Smoove	1	Frederick Douglass						Yes					
Ben Atha	1	James Bond (Daniel Craig)						Yes					
Jolie "NoShame" Drake	1	Caitlyn Jenner						Yes					
Mike O'Hearn	1	Hulk (didn't voice)						Yes					
Mike Betette	1	Pompey the Great						Yes					
Meghan Tonjes	1	Catherine the Great						Yes					
Brian Walters	1	Ash Ketchum						Yes					
T-Pain	1	Stevie Wonder						Yes					
Lilly Singh	1	Wonder Woman						Yes					
Rob Rico	1	Che Guevara									Yes		
Natasha "MC Goldiloxx" Lloyd	1	Wendy									Yes		
Valin "Zeale" Zamarron	1	Richard Pryor									Yes		
Gary Anthony Williams	1	Bill Cosby									Yes		
Jackie Tohn	1	Joan Rivers									Yes		
Cara Francis	1	Mother Teresa									Yes		
Boyinaband	1	Harry Potter (voice)									Yes		
The Jackpot Golden Boys	1 each	Ron Weasley; Fred Weasley; George Weasley									Yes		
Shay Carl	1	Henry VIII										Yes	
Susan Deming	1	Hillary Clinton										Yes	
Scru Face Jean	1	Mansa Musa											Yes
Croix Provence	1	Lara Croft											Yes
Kimberly Michelle Vaughn	1	Kamala Harris											Yes
Evan Ferrante	1	Tom Cruise											Yes

== Episodes ==
Season	Episodes	Originally released	
Season	Episodes	First released	Last released
1	15	September 26, 2010	November 16, 2011
2	18	December 8, 2011	April 22, 2013
3	12	October 7, 2013	July 14, 2014
4	12	November 10, 2014	August 3, 2015
Bonus		December 16, 2015	
5	12	May 2, 2016	January 9, 2017
Bonus		December 7, 2018	
Flash	3	December 16, 2018	January 26, 2019
6	11	April 20, 2019	December 5, 2020
Cancelled		February 15, 2020	
7	10	June 14, 2021	TBA

== Awards and nominations ==
Awards and nominations for Epic Rap Battles of History
Year	Award	Category	Result	Recipient(s)
2013	3rd Streamy Awards	Best Writing: Comedy	Nominated	Peter Shukoff, EpicLLOYD
2013	3rd Streamy Awards	Best Online Musician	Won	Peter Shukoff
2013	3rd Streamy Awards	Best Original Song	Won	Peter Shukoff, Lloyd Ahlquist ("Steve Jobs vs. Bill Gates")
2013	3rd Streamy Awards	Best Music Series	Won	Epic Rap Battles of History
2013	3rd Streamy Awards	Best Use of Fashion & Design	Won	Mary Gutfleisch
2013	1st YouTube Music Awards	Video of the Year	Nominated	"Barack Obama vs. Mitt Romney"
2013	1st YouTube Music Awards	Artist of the Year	Nominated	Peter Shukoff, Lloyd Ahlquist
2014	4th Streamy Awards	Best Writing	Won	Peter Shukoff, Lloyd Ahlquist, Zach Sherwin, Dante Cimadamore, Mike Betette
2014	4th Streamy Awards	Music Video	Won	"Goku vs. Superman"
2014	4th Streamy Awards	Costume Design	Won	Sulai Lopez
2014	4th Streamy Awards	Editing	Nominated	Andrew Sherman, Ryan Moulton, Daniel Turcan, Peter Shukoff
2014	4th Streamy Awards	Collaboration	Nominated	Peter Shukoff, Lloyd Ahlquist, Snoop Dogg ("Moses vs. Santa Claus")
2015	5th Streamy Awards	Writing	Won	Peter Shukoff, Lloyd Ahlquist, Zach Sherwin, Dante Cimadamore and Mike Betette
2015	5th Streamy Awards	Costume Design	Won	Sulai Lopez
2015	5th Streamy Awards	Editing	Won	Andrew Sherman, Ryan Moulton, Daniel Turcan and Peter Shukoff
2015	5th Streamy Awards	Collaboration	Won	Peter Shukoff, Lloyd Ahlquist, Grace Helbig, and Hannah Hart
2015	26th Producers Guild of America Awards	Outstanding Digital Series	Nominated	Epic Rap Battles of History
2016	27th Producers Guild of America Awards	Outstanding Digital Series	Nominated	Epic Rap Battles of History
2016	68th Primetime Emmy Awards	Outstanding Short Form Variety Series	Nominated	Epic Rap Battles of History
2016	6th Streamy Awards	Collaboration	Nominated	Peter Shukoff, Lloyd Ahlquist, Meghan Tonjes, Mike Betette and Zach Sherwin
2017	69th Primetime Emmy Awards	Outstanding Short Form Variety Series	Nominated	Epic Rap Battles of History
