= Dan Bull =

English rapper and songwriter (born 1986)

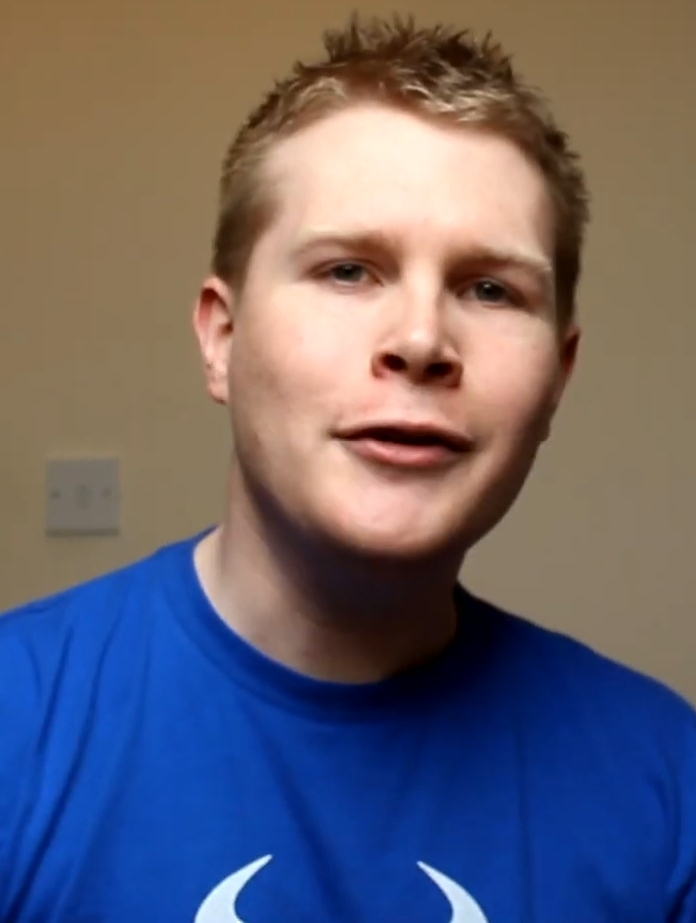
- Bull in a YouTube video in 2012

Background information
- Also known as: Douglby
- Born: Daniel George L. Bull; March 27, 1986 (age 40); Bromsgrove, Worcestershire, England
- Genres: Hip hop
- Occupations: Rapper; songwriter; gamer
- Instruments: Vocals; guitar; keyboards
- Years active: 2006–present
- Website: www.itsdanbull.com

YouTube information
- Channel: danbull
- Years active: 2006–present
- Genre: Music
- Subscribers: 3.38 million
- Views: 1.28 billion
- Last updated: 19 August 2026

Daniel George L. Bull (born 27 March 1986) is an English rapper and songwriter known best for his songs about video games, which he publishes on his YouTube channel.

== Biography ==
Daniel George L. Bull was born on 27 March 1986, in Bromsgrove, Worcestershire, England.

Bull has released songs on subjects such as YouTube issues, digital rights, the music industry, and gaming. Bull's actions have gained attention, specifically from the TalkTalk Group, who requested to team up with him against the Digital Economy Bill.

Bull's music was featured in the British press as part of attempts to save BBC Radio 6, campaign against the Digital Economy Bill, and protest in favour of filesharing. He was diagnosed with Asperger syndrome, which is referenced in some of his songs, such as "A Portrait of the Autist".

Bull creates gaming raps, ranging with the subgenres nerdcore, political, and comedy hip hop. He was briefly partnered with Machinima; however, due to a dispute, he now uploads videos independently.

Bull's album Face was released in December 2011. The 12-track album includes ten brand new songs as well as the 2010 tracks "America" and "John Lennon". The album focuses on topics such as medical recovery, war, love, autism, alcoholism, and pride.

On 27 March 2015, he released his fourth album, Bullmatic. It is Bull's re-imagining of Nas' classic 1994 album Illmatic: for example, Nas' "N.Y. State of Mind" is re-imagined as "U.K. State of Mind".

Bull released the song "Robocopyright" in March 2019, which criticises Article 13 of the proposed Directive on Copyright in the Digital Single Market.

== Discography ==
=== Singles ===
Dan Bull singles
Title	Artist	Year	Peak UK R&B	Peak UK Ind.
"Generation of Gaming"	Dan Bull	2010		
"Minecraft Epic Rap"	Dan Bull	2011		
"Sharing is Caring"	Dan Bull	2012	35	9
"Kicky Kicky Flow"	Dan Bull ft The Yogscast	2013		22
"Boom Boom Boom Boom Boom Boom Boom Boom"	Dan Bull	2014		
"Robocopyright"	Dan Bull	2019		

=== Studio albums ===
- Safe (Freshnut, 2009)
