= EpicLLOYD =

American musician, rapper and YouTuber (born 1977)

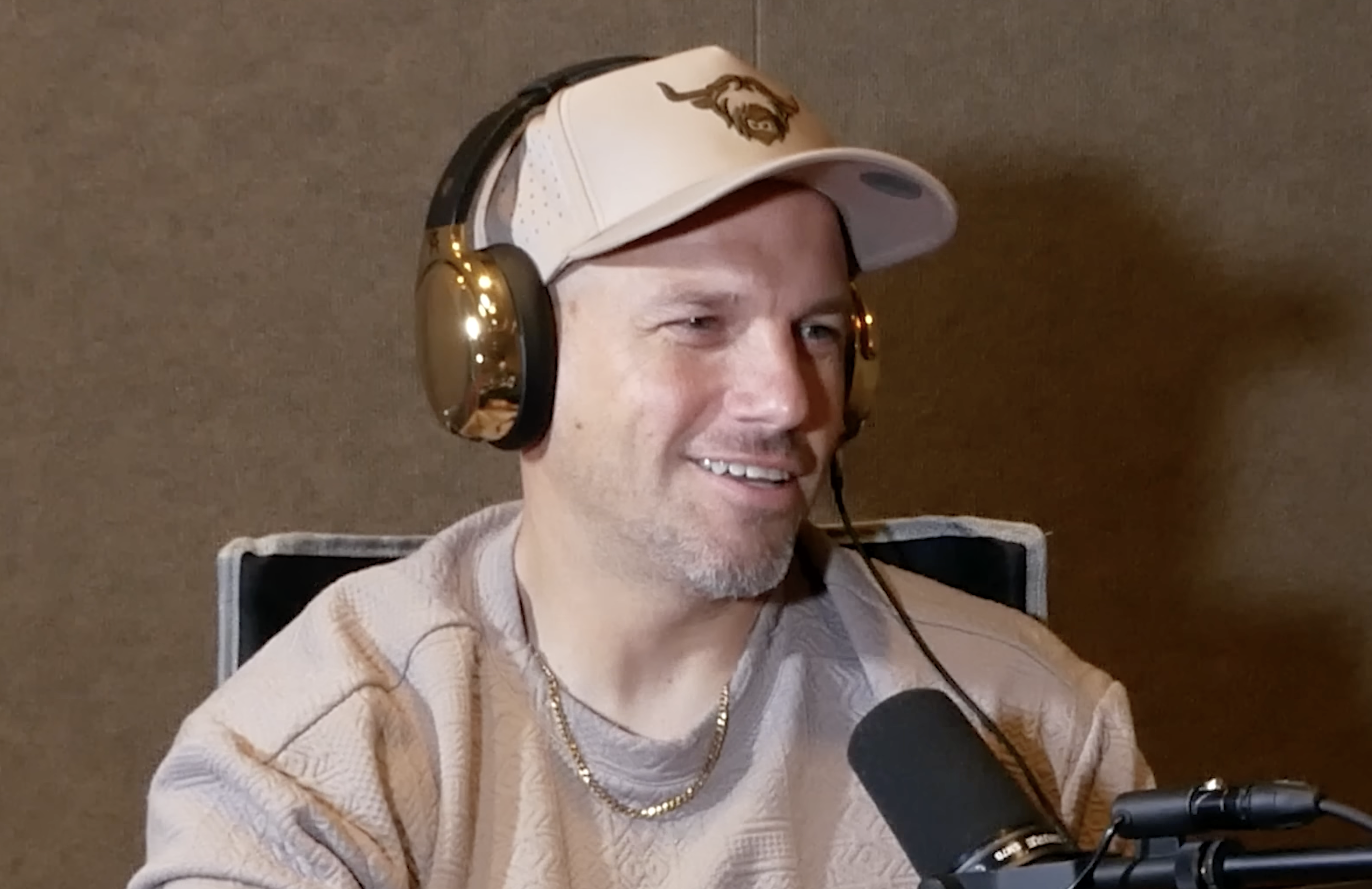
- Ahlquist in 2025

Background information
- Also known as: EpicLLOYD
- Born: Lloyd Leonard Ahlquist; January 18, 1977 (age 49); Staten Island, New York City, U.S.
- Genres: Comedy hip hop; nerdcore
- Occupations: Internet personality; comedian; singer; rapper; songwriter; producer
- Years active: 1999–present
- Spouse: Josie Hutchinson (m. 2009)
- Website: erbofhistory.com

Lloyd Leonard Ahlquist (born January 18, 1977), better known by his online alias EpicLLOYD, is an American internet personality and rapper best known for the YouTube video series Epic Rap Battles of History, along with Peter "Nice Peter" Shukoff. Ahlquist has performed as an MC, actor, improviser, and writer. In addition to the rap battles, he and Shukoff cameoed in The SpongeBob Movie: Sponge Out of Water, where they also contributed a rap battle at the end of the movie.

== Comedy and theater ==
Ahlquist was formerly the general manager and artistic director of M.I.'s Westside Comedy Theater. Ahlquist also studied at UMass Amherst and later trained in Chicago (where he met his frequent collaborator Peter Shukoff) at The Second City, Improv Olympic and Annoyance Theatre. Ahlquist was one of the founding members of Mission IMPROVable, and continues to perform with the group weekly in their show "The Grind" while serving on the Board of Directors of M.i. Productions. He founded the comedy troupe after dropping out of the University of Massachusetts with five classmates.

In August 2014, Ahqluist hosted YouTube's first live-streamed improv comedy event, "Off the Top." A trailer for "Epic Studios", a show starring Ahlquist, was released in 2015 and the first episodes were posted to his personal YouTube channel in April 2017.

== YouTube ==
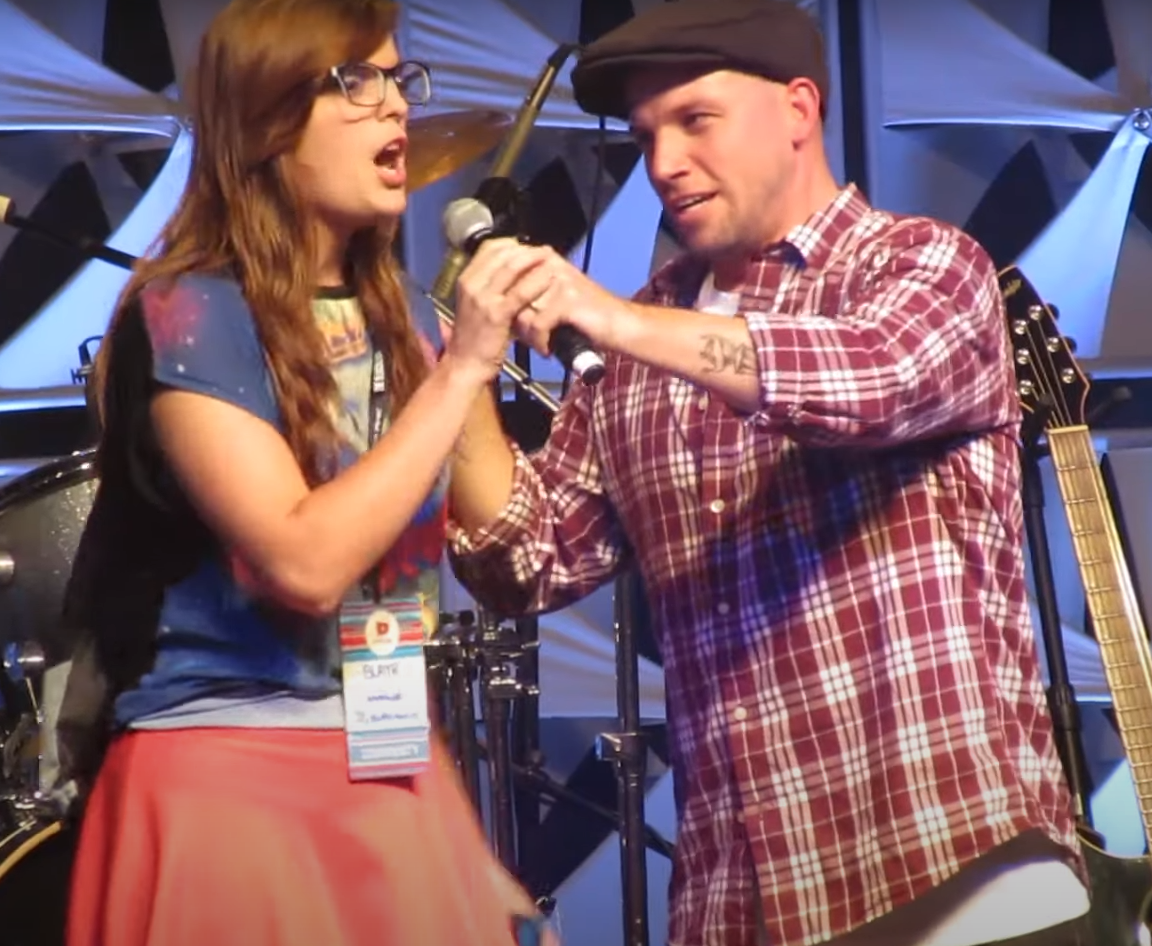
Ahlquist (right) performing at VidCon 2013

=== Solo channel ===
Ahlquist launched his YouTube channel on April 20, 2011. He has a staple series on his own channel, titled "Dis Raps for Hire", which features Ahlquist taking a user-submitted comment asking Ahlquist to lyrically "destroy" or insult another person that is bullying or harassing the user. To date, 20 "Dis Raps for Hire" have been produced. Season 2 of "Dis Raps for Hire" started on March 11, 2013.

On July 17, 2012, Lloyd's channel hit 200,000 subscribers. As a "thank you" gesture, he produced a parody of the Cinnamon challenge. In 2016, Lloyd hit 400,000 subscribers. By 2021, he had 479,000 subscribers.

Starting in 2017, Ahlquist has also run the series Epic Studios, where he portrays a fictional version of himself as he struggles to keep the Canadian music studio he inherited from his father from being turned into condos.

=== Epic Rap Battles of History ===
In 2010, Ahlquist partnered with singer and rapper Peter Shukoff to create Epic Rap Battles of History under Maker Studios sometime after Ahlquist, Shukoff and Zach Sherwin (a guest in the rap battles), were playing Check OneTwo, a freestyle rap improv game where they took suggestions from the audience of famous people to battle rap off the top of their heads. Ahlquist has played several characters in the successful rap battles, and has specialized in playing villains such as Bill O'Reilly and Adolf Hitler. Epic Rap Battles of History received four wins at the 3rd Streamy Awards, with Ahlquist receiving one of the four awards. By October 2014, the rap battles accumulated a total view count of over 1 billion, excluding the hundreds of millions of views earned by the season 1 episodes. As of early 2020, the Epic Rap Battle channel had over 3.4 billion views.

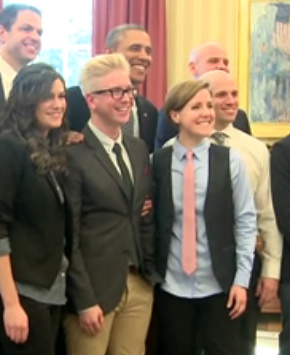
Ahlquist (bottom right) with President Barack Obama, 2014

== Personal life ==
Ahlquist grew up in Exeter, New Hampshire, and graduated from Exeter High School. He married Josie Hutchinson, a student affairs educator, on 18 October 2009 in Malibu. They live in Los Angeles.

== Discography ==
=== Albums ===
- Dis Raps for Hire – Season 1 (2013)
- Here EP (2016)
- Dis Raps for Hire – Season 2 (2018)
- A Bad Name for Rappers (2019)

=== Songs ===
- Dis Raps For Hire – Charles
- Dis Raps For Hire – Southwest High School
- Dis Raps For Hire – Christian
- Dis Raps For Hire – Jennifer
- Dis Raps For Hire – Justin
- Dis Raps For Hire – James
- Dis Raps For Hire – William, Reshad, and Tyrance
- Dis Raps For Hire – Daniel
- Dis Raps For Hire – Joan
- Gift Raps For Hire – Momma Metcalf
- Dis Raps For Hire – Glasscock
- Dis Raps For Hire – Jason and Ramone
- Dis Raps For Hire – Steven, Lucas, Mark, and Nelson
- Dis Raps For Hire – EthanAlways
- Dis Raps For Hire – Diamond
- Dis Raps For Hire – Jerome
- Dis Raps For Hire – Katrina & Cheyenne
- Dis Raps For Hire – This Guy
- Dis Raps for Hire – Cory
- Gift Raps for Hire – Brandon
- The L-Verse
- Coming Up Short
- Pawn
- Ninja
- Mr. Nothing
- I Aint Got No Watch (I Aint Got No Bling)
- New Things
- Holding The Seams Together
- Scars
- Cheap Beer
- Space
- Pops Over the Falls
- Goodbye

== Filmography ==
| Year | Title | Role | Notes |
|---|---|---|---|
| 2010–present | Epic Rap Battles of History | various roles | web series |
| 2011 | X-Men: First Class Rejects | Prof. Doug Xavier | web short |
| 2011 | The League | Dr. Andre Nodick | Season 3, Episode 1, "The Lockout" |
| 2012 | Ninja – Part 2 | | Sam Macaroni web video |
| 2012 | Epic Rap Battle of Manliness | Jogger | Rhett and Link web video |
| 2013 | Key & Peele | Rap Battle Host | Episode #3.1 |
| 2014 | The Most Popular Girls in School | Darren Darabond | Episodes 50–52 |
| 2015 | The SpongeBob Movie: Sponge Out of Water | Surfer Dude, Seagull | |
| 2016 | Crossroads of History | LLOYD | web series |
| 2016 | Dirty 30 | Homeless Man | |
| 2021 | The Mystic Crystal | Knight No. 1 | Ninja Sex Party web video |

== Awards and nominations ==
| Year | Award Show | Category | Result | Recipient(s) |
|---|---|---|---|---|
| 2013 | 3rd Streamy Awards | Best Writing: Comedy | Nominated | Peter Shukoff, Lloyd Ahlquist |
| 2013 | 3rd Streamy Awards | Best Original Song | Won | - |
