= Nice Peter =

American musician and YouTuber (born 1979)

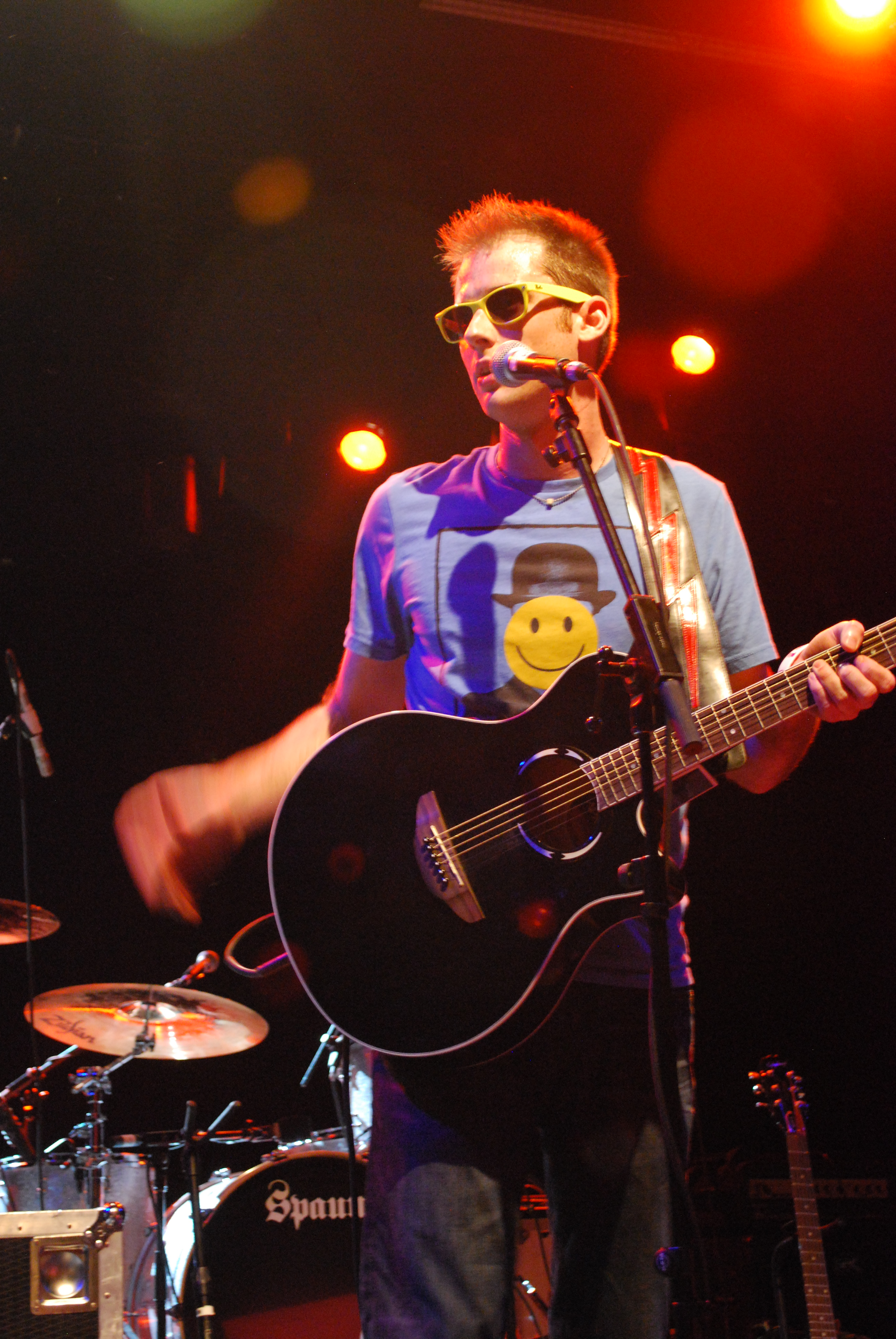
- Nice Peter performing at the 2011 DigiTour

Background information
- Also known as: Nice Peter; Bluesocks
- Born: Peter Alexis Shukoff; August 15, 1979 (age 47); Rochester, New York, U.S.
- Genres: Comedy hip-hop; nerdcore; geek rock
- Occupations: Internet personality; comedian; singer; rapper; songwriter; producer
- Instruments: Vocals; guitar; keyboards; bass; drums
- Years active: 2000–present
- Website: nicepeter.com

Peter Alexis Shukoff (born August 15, 1979), best known as his stage name Nice Peter or Bluesocks, is an American musician, rapper, singer-songwriter and Internet personality. A self-described "Comic/Guitar Hero", he is best known for the comedy on his YouTube channel, Nice Peter, and especially for the comedic series Epic Rap Battles of History, which he co-created with Lloyd "EpicLLOYD" Ahlquist.

As of June 8, 2016, NicePeter has over 2.6 million YouTube subscribers. The day after hitting one million subscribers, the video game channel G4 crowned Nice Peter the King of Dot Comedy on Attack of the Show!. His two channels, Nice Peter and ERB (Epic Rap Battles of History), have a total of over 17 million subscribers and 4 billion views as of February 2019. He also has a third channel that he uses for vlogs and "Monday Shows", a show that he uploads on either Mondays or Tuesdays consisting of different segments including "Viewer Mail", "Twitter Question Time", and "Ask a Giraffe". They have been featured on the Huffington Post, Billboard.com, Forbes and Wired.

== Life and career ==
Shukoff was born in Rochester, New York to a Russian father, Igor Shukoff, and an American mother, Denise Shukoff (née Hayes). He has two sisters. As a child, Shukoff would often Irish dance for his class. Shukoff graduated from the School of the Arts in 1997 and attended Fredonia State University, where he majored in education and history. He originally planned on becoming a history teacher, but the plan did not work out. He later became a birthday party magician. He was interested in rap music from a very early age. Shukoff learned to play guitar before he had finished school, but spent a time pursuing a comedic career. Shukoff later moved to Chicago. He began playing live in bars and comedy clubs in the area where he met Lloyd Ahlquist, his future collaborative partner.

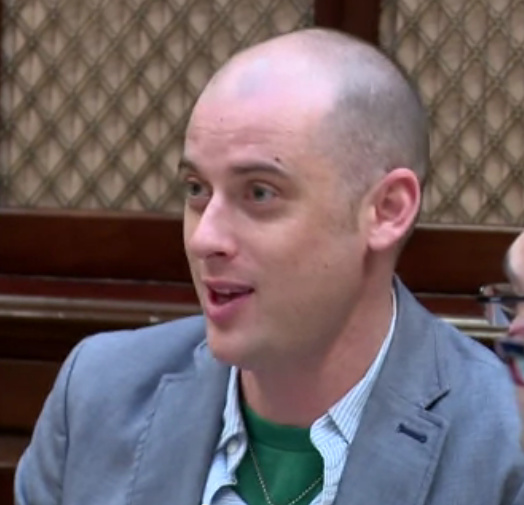
Nice Peter in 2014

Epic Rap Battles of History is a comedic music video series created by Peter Shukoff and Lloyd Ahlquist. Ahlquist and Shukoff met at a house party in Chicago organized by an improv group that Ahlquist was a part of. The series features historical and popular fictional and real-life figures battling each other through the medium of rap. Battles have included "Darth Vader vs. Adolf Hitler", "Abraham Lincoln vs. Chuck Norris", and "Miley Cyrus vs. Joan of Arc". Some episodes use characters that are fictional, whether it be television or movie characters, as seen in "Rick Grimes vs. Walter White". Others use comic book characters, as seen in "Goku vs. Superman". Episodes typically consist of Nice Peter and EpicLLOYD rapping against each other in character, but sometimes feature guest stars in addition to or replacing Shukoff and Ahlquist. Occasionally, the pair appear in non-speaking background roles, as in the episodes "Cleopatra vs. Marilyn Monroe", "Gandhi vs. Martin Luther King Jr.", "Michael Jordan vs. Muhammad Ali", and "Stephen King vs. Edgar Allan Poe". Shukoff and Ahlquist also contributed a rap battle to the film The SpongeBob Movie: Sponge Out of Water and performed it with co-star Matt Berry. Shukoff and Ahlquist also made a cameo appearance as surfer dudes in the film.

== Personal life ==
Shukoff announced that he had married in 2018. He has two children, a daughter born in 2018 and a son born in 2020. They live in Culver City, California.

Shukoff has explained that although he was initially more active on social media, his social media usage decreased as he felt it was artificial. He said that his baldness helped him realize this.

== Awards and nominations ==
Awards and Nominations for Epic Rap Battles of History
Year	Award Show	Category	Result	Recipient(s)
2013	3rd Streamy Awards	Best Writing: Comedy	Nominated	Peter Shukoff, Lloyd Ahlquist
2013	3rd Streamy Awards	Best Online Musician	Won	Peter Shukoff
2013	3rd Streamy Awards	Best Original Song	Won	Peter Shukoff, Lloyd Ahlquist (Steve Jobs vs. Bill Gates)

== Filmography ==
Year	Title	Role	Notes
2010–present	Epic Rap Battles of History	various roles	web series also co-creator alongside EpicLLOYD
2015	The SpongeBob Movie: Sponge Out of Water	Surfer Dude, Painty the Pirate	
2021	The Mitchells vs. The Machines	additional voices	
