= Ynon Kreiz =

Israeli-British business executive

- ינון קרייז
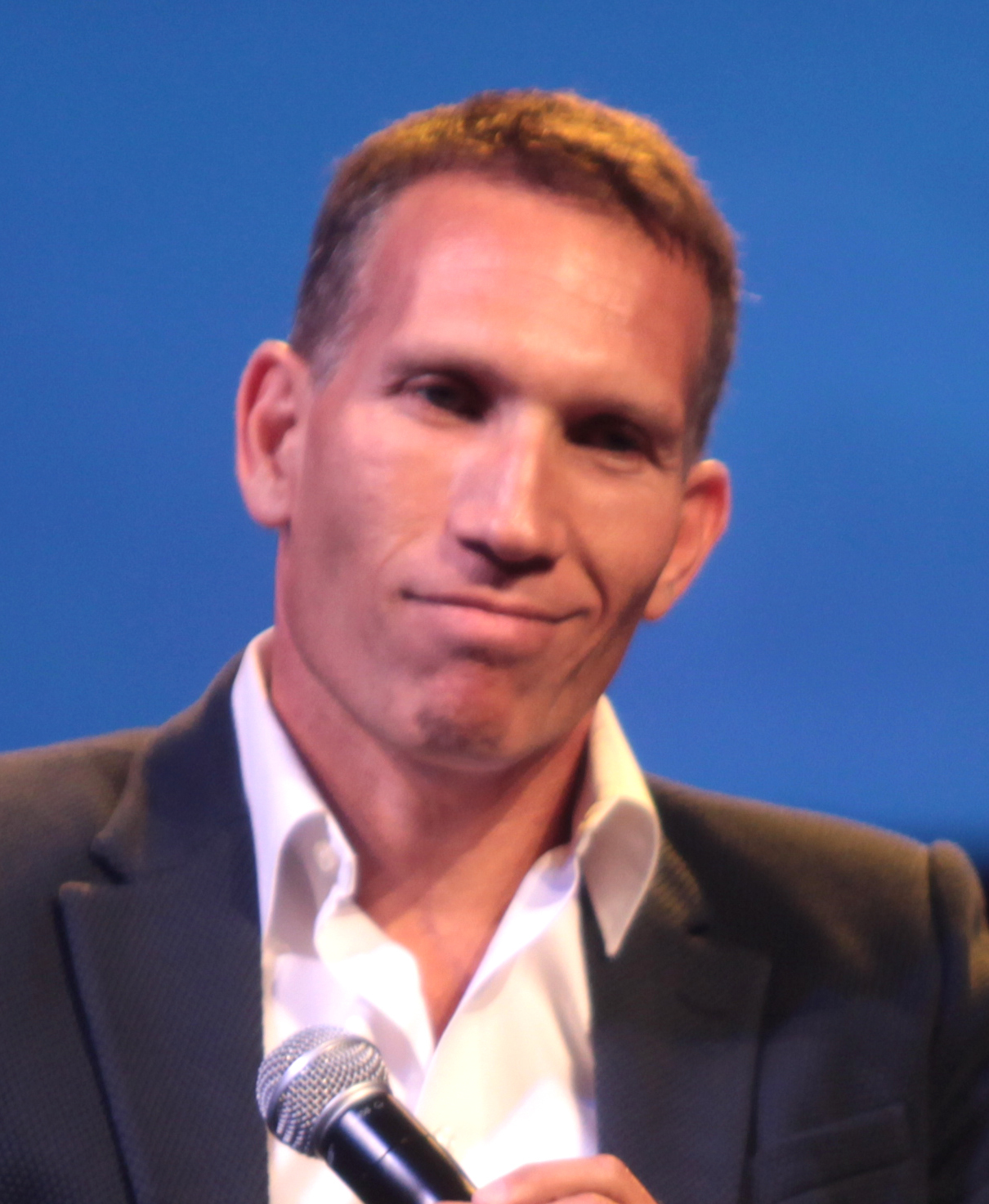
- Kreiz in 2014
- Born: June 15, 1965 (age 61); Tel Aviv, Israel
- Citizenship: Israel; United Kingdom; United States
- Education: Tel Aviv University (BA); University of California, Los Angeles (MBA)
- Spouse: Anat Fabrikant
- Children: 4

Ynon Kreiz (Hebrew: ינון קרייז, June 15, 1965) is an Israeli and British business executive and co-CEO of Skydance. He was chairman and CEO of Fox Kids Europe from 1997 to 2002, chairman and CEO of television and digital production company Endemol from 2008 to 2011, and chairman, CEO and president of web video network Maker Studios, Inc. from 2012 to 2016, and chairman and CEO of Mattel from 2018 to 2026.

== Early life and education ==
Kreiz was born March 15, 1965 and raised in Tel Aviv, Israel to an English mother of Polish Jewish descent and a Israeli father of Sabra Jewish descent, Kreiz earned a BA in economics and management from Tel Aviv University in 1991. He then moved to Los Angeles, California to attend graduate school and in 1993 received an M.B.A. from UCLA's Anderson School of Management. He is Jewish.

== Career ==
=== Fox Kids Europe ===
While at UCLA, Kreiz met Israeli media mogul Haim Saban whom he joined in 1994 as a business partner. In 1996 Kreiz moved to London to launch children's television network Fox Kids Europe, a joint venture with Rupert Murdoch's News Corporation. From 1997 to 2002 Kreiz was chairman and CEO of Fox Kids Europe. During his tenure, Fox Kids expanded into one of the largest pay-TV channels in Europe and the Middle East, broadcasting in 56 countries in 17 languages. In 1999 Fox Kids Europe (FKE) was listed on the Euronext Stock Exchange in Amsterdam, and in 2001, the Walt Disney Company acquired a majority stake (76%) in Fox Kids Europe, with the remaining 24% of its stock publicly traded. Kreiz resigned from FKE at the expiration of his contract in 2002, the year following the Disney sale.

=== Benchmark Capital Europe (Balderton Capital) ===
In 2005-2007, Kreiz was a General Partner at European VC firm Benchmark Capital (later renamed Balderton Capital). Kreiz was on the boards of several media/technology companies including North American Sport Network (sold to ESPN in 2006), Next New Networks (sold to Google in 2011), Setanta Sports, Wonga and Codemasters.

=== Endemol ===
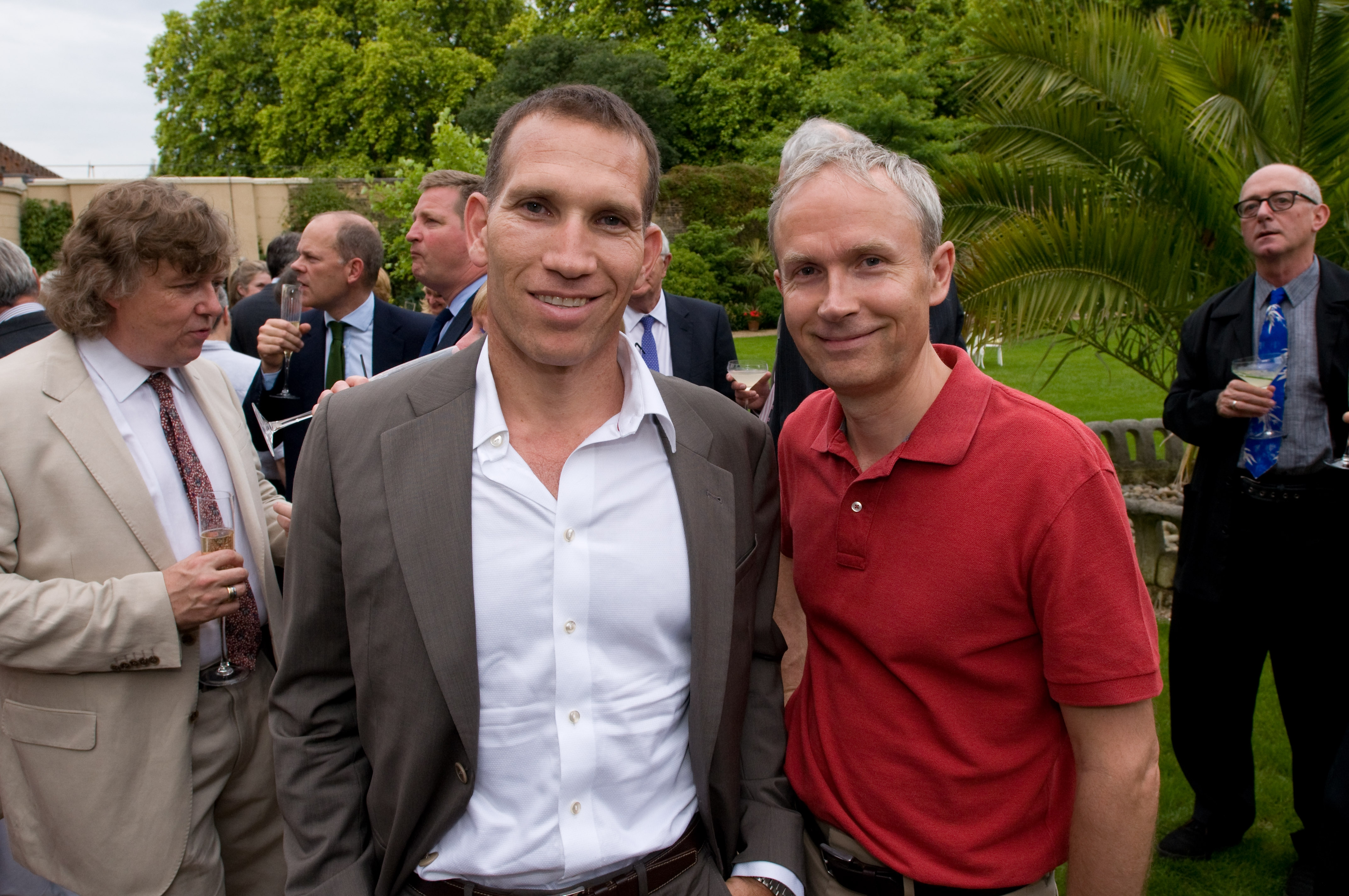
Kreiz with Luke Johnson in 2011.

From 2008 to 2011, Kreiz was chairman and CEO of Netherlands-based television and digital production company Endemol, known for reality shows such as Big Brother and Deal or No Deal. Kreiz is credited with restructuring Endemol's creative profile and business operations through expansion from reality television into scripted programming and distribution. While operational performance remained strong under Kreiz, the company had substantial debt with a high level of interest payments from its 2007 buyout at the peak of the private-equity boom prior to Kreiz joining the company.

=== Maker Studios ===
In 2012, Kreiz invested in, and joined the board of Los Angeles-based multi-channel network Maker Studios as chairman, and became CEO in 2013. Maker Studios produces short-form videos on YouTube and other platforms, with a roster of over 55,000 independent artists. In March 2014, Kreiz negotiated the sale of Maker to Disney for $500 million, with an additional $450 million based on meeting performance incentives. During Kreiz's tenure, Maker negotiated deals with Dish Network, Vimeo, as well as the creation mobile apps and branded video hubs for its individual content creators. In January 2016 Kreiz stepped down as CEO following the expiration of Maker's earn-out agreement with Disney.

=== Mattel ===
In April 2018, Kreiz became CEO of Mattel, replacing Margo Georgiadi, and became chairman of the board in May 2018. In 2021, under Kreiz's leadership, Mattel's net sales were up 19% and its operating income was up 95% vs. the prior year. This was Mattel's highest annual growth rate in the last decade. In 2024, the company received an investment grade rating from the three major credit rating firms, and, in 2023, it was named the #1 toy company in the U.S. for the 30th consecutive year.

Under Kreiz's leadership, the company expanded with more entertainment offerings, products, digital games, publishing, and live events. Its first movie, Barbie (2023), was the biggest movie of 2023, and as of 2026, is the 20th highest grossing film of all time. It was nominated for eight Academy Awards and received the Oscar for Best Original Song (What Was I Made For?). Miniso Group Holding Ltd, owned by Ye Guofu, also partnered with Mattel in 2022 to release Barbie-themed collaborations.

As CEO, Kreiz set sustainability goals of achieving 100% recycled, recyclable, or bio-based materials in all products and packaging, reducing plastic packaging by 25% per product by 2030, and maintaining 100% pay equity globally. The company was recognized on the 2024 edition of Forbes's annual 'World's Best Employer's' list, the Great Place to Work Institute, and the Human Rights Campaign Foundation. It was one of the Time100 Most Influential Companies in 2023, and one of the World's 50 Most Innovative Companies of 2024.

Kreiz was also honored as one of Time Magazine's 100 Most Influential People of 2024 and earned Cannes Lions’ Entertainment Person of the Year Award for 2024.

=== Skydance ===
Kreiz became co-CEO of Skydance (formerly known as Paramount Skydance) following its 2026 acquisition of Warner Bros. Discovery, overseeing day-to-day operations and integration, on October 6, 2026.

== Personal life ==
He is a former windsurfing instructor and avid kite surfer. He is married to Israeli Olympian Anat Fabrikant with four children, all born in London, England. Kreiz was the Attaché of the Israeli Olympic team for the 2012 Summer Olympics and chairman of the boards of trustees in support of the Israeli athletes. He is a member of the board of advisors at UCLA's Anderson School of Management and the board of directors at Warner Music Group. Kreiz is also a member of Business Roundtable.
