= Shay Carl =

American video blogger and YouTube personality

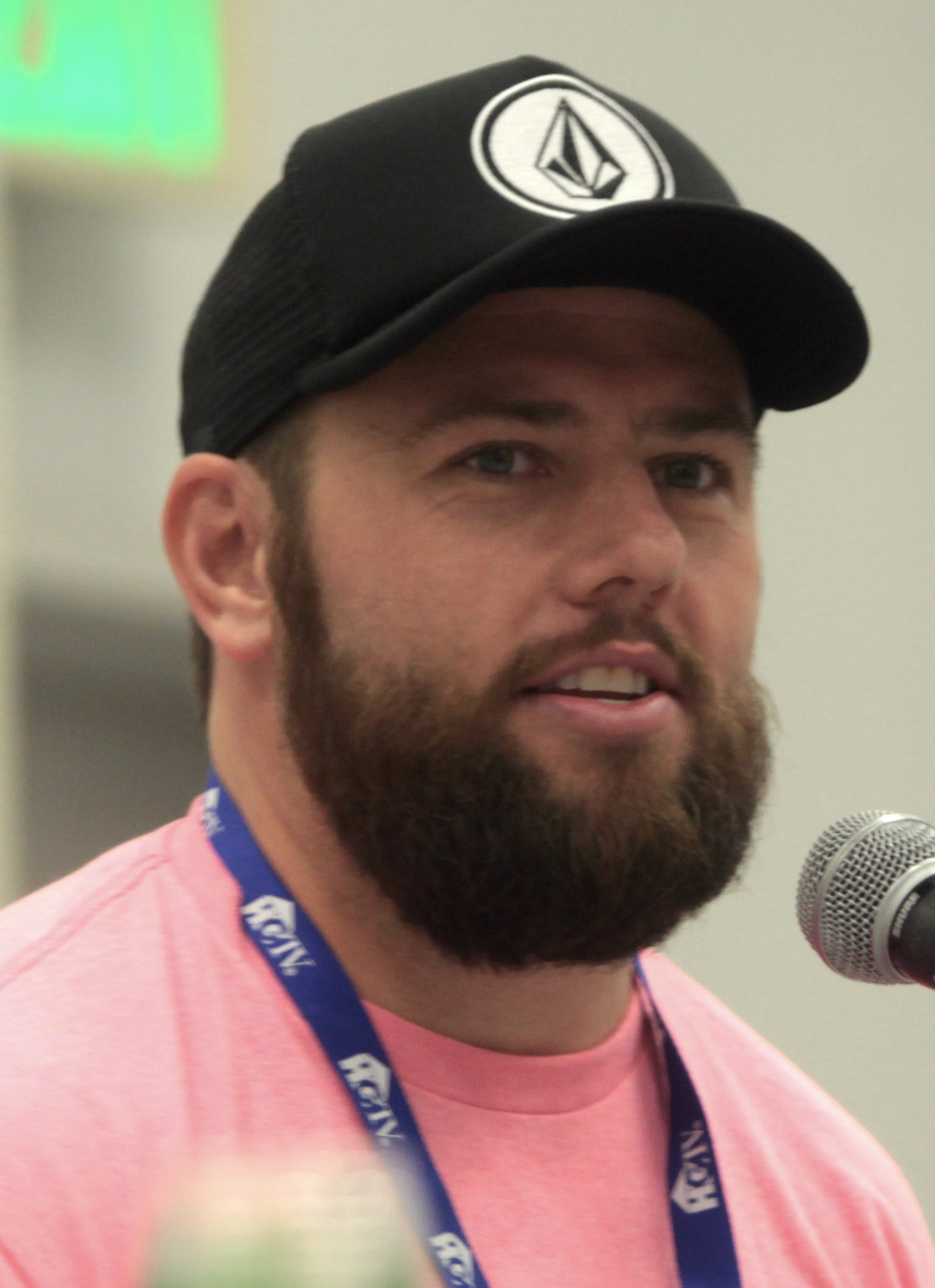
- Shay Carl at VidCon 2014
- Born: Shay Carl Butler; March 5, 1980 (age 46); Logan, Utah, U.S.
- Occupations: Vlogger; entrepreneur
- Years active: 2007–present
- Title: Co-founder of Maker Studios and founder of Trixin Clothing
- Spouse: Colette Crofts (m. 2003)
- Children: 5

YouTube information
- Channel: SHAYTARDS
- Years active: 2008–present
- Genre: Vlogs
- Subscribers: 4.7 million
- Views: 2.9 billion
- Last updated: October 21, 2025

Shay Carl Butler (born March 5, 1980) is an American YouTuber. He has three YouTube channels, two of which ("shaycarl" and "SHAYTARDS") have over three million subscribers. Butler and Corey Vidal developed a documentary called Vlogumentary on a $200,000+ budget that was funded with an Indiegogo campaign and raised by mostly from his viewers. Vlogumentary was released on April 20, 2016. Forbes called Butler one of the "most successful video entrepreneurs on YouTube" and in 2011 The New York Times featured Butler's production company Maker Studios.

== Early life ==
Shay Carl Butler was born on March 5, 1980, in Logan, Utah, to Carl and Laurie Butler. Butler is the oldest of four children and his siblings are all active in the YouTube community. At the age of four, Butler's family moved to Phoenix, Arizona, and subsequently to Pocatello, Idaho. After graduating from Highland High School, Butler served a full-time, two year mission in Barbados, Trinidad and Guyana for the Church of Jesus Christ of Latter-day Saints. He briefly attended Idaho State University, but dropped out to start working on his own. Prior to appearing on YouTube, Butler installed granite countertops for a living and worked as a school bus driver. He also worked as a radio DJ for Z103.

== YouTube popularity ==
Butler became more popular on YouTube after Philip DeFranco watched one of his videos and gave him a shout-out. The shout-out resulted in a rise of Butler's subscribers and a friendship with DeFranco. By working with other YouTubers at The Station, Butler more than quadrupled his subscribers. Butler later joined the YouTube Partner Program and co-founded Maker Studios. In November 2009, he collaborated with Midi Mafia to create a flash mob at Planet Hollywood in Las Vegas. In 2009, Butler's "SHAYTARDS" channel won "Best YouTube Channel or Personality" at Mashable's 3rd annual Open Web Awards. In 2013, the same channel was one of the nominees in the "Best Non-Fiction or Reality Series" category of the 3rd Streamy Awards. Butler and his wife, Colette, ran a podcast called "When the Kids Go to Sleep", where they interviewed YouTubers and celebrities such as Terry Crews and Bas Rutten. In February 2013, actor Matt Damon made a guest appearance in one of Butler's vlogs after he and Damon had collaborated on a video to promote a Water.org project. Butler sometimes creates sponsored videos, in which he promotes brands or companies in exchange for financial benefits, including with General Electric, Foot Locker, Kia and Skype.

In 2014 the Shay Carl YouTube channel was listed on New Media Rockstars Top 100 Channels, ranked at #31.

In late 2015, Shay, along with his 12-year-old son Gavin, wrote a lifestyle, self-help book, Fat Dad, Fat Kid.

On September 28, 2016, Butler announced that he would suspend the Shaytards YouTube channel for one year.

=== 2017 infidelity scandal ===
On February 12, 2017, Butler announced he would be leaving YouTube for the time being. In his announcement on his Twitter page, Butler said that due to alcoholism, his "purpose is to rehab". International Business Times ran a story about Carl allegedly exchanging sexual messages through Twitter with an adult webcam model named Aria Nina.

The Shaytards channel became active again in March 2018 with a video where Shay and his wife Colette talk about their relationship and the YouTube channel, and the family announced they would start uploading videos again, but would "take it one day at a time" and not commit to a daily vlog schedule. In the following videos, Shay openly discussed attending addiction meetings and working on his and Colette's relationship.

== Personal life ==
Butler married Colette Crofts ("Colette Kati") in January 2003. The couple have five children: Gavin, Avia, Emmi, Brock and Daxton. His family is known as the "Shaytards" and as "YouTube's first family". Butler stated that much of his children's lives have been recorded and distributed in public. Butler's son, Brock, has been noted as the internet's "first Truman baby" as his life has been documented since birth. His daughter, Emmi, was featured on the front cover of James Blunt's album Some Kind of Trouble. Butler's other daughter, Avia, released the song "Forever Love" on June 12, 2014.

In 2014, Butler bought a property extending 1000-acres in Pocatello, Idaho. In 2016, he purchased the nearby Pebble Creek Ski Area in Inkom, Idaho.

Butler lost 112 pounds (51 kg) in the space of a year and subsequently ran three marathons, one of which he ran with motivational speaker Dave Ramsey, with whom he is good friends. Butler documented his weight loss journey on his "ShayLoss" channel.

== YouTube channels ==
Butler has two YouTube channels. His "shaycarl" and "SHAYTARDS" channels have over one million and five million subscribers, respectively. For his "shaycarl" channel, Butler frequently works with celebrities such as retired basketball player Charles Barkley and retired mixed martial artist Bas Rutten.

== Involvement with Maker Studios ==
Butler originally moved out to Los Angeles in 2009 to form the company Maker Studios, along with friends and fellow YouTubers Lisa and Ben Donovan, Dan Zappin, Philip DeFranco and Kassem Gharaibeh. Maker's programming was divided into four networks: "Men", "Women", "Family", and "Entertainment". These four networks included "The Mom's View", which Butler's wife Colette appeared on regularly as a part of the weekly "Mom's View Talk Show". Maker Studios was sold to The Walt Disney Company for $500 million on March 24, 2014. During its 25th season, America's Funniest Home Videos, whose YouTube channels were being managed by Maker Studios from January 2014, promoted its brand via two web series, one of which was created by Butler.

== Awards and nominations ==
Awards

- 2009 Mashable Open Web Awards Best YouTube Channel or Personality: SHAYTARDS
- 2014 4th Streamy Awards ICON award (entrepreneurship category)

Nominations

- 2013 3rd Streamy Awards Best Non-Fiction or Reality Series: SHAYTARDS

== Filmography ==
- 2009 The Station (web series; 5 episodes) as Randy and Shay
- 2010–2011 Annoying Orange (web series; 2 episodes) as Cabbage and Shay Red (voice)
- 2011 No Ordinary Family (TV series; 1 episode) as Security Guard
- 2012–2013 MyMusic (web series; 3 episodes) as Hipster Metal
- 2015–2016 Wonder Quest (web series) (13 episodes) as Heinous (voice)
- 2016 Studio C (TV series; 1 episode) as Johnny "The Vlogfather"

Butler has also done voice acting work for Cartoonium's Shaybeard online cartoon series, which features Butler as a Viking. He also co-starred in a public service announcement of the Adopt the Arts Foundation.

== See also ==
- List of YouTubers
- Maker Studios
