= Hyperlinked =

YouTube Original about Miss O and Friends starring L2M

- Genre: Autobiography
- Created by: Juliette Brindak Blake; Hermine Brindak; Larry Reitzer
- Directed by: Kimmy Gatewood; Amelia French
- Starring: Mariangeli Collado; McKenzie Mack; Jenna Raine Simmons; Lexi Drew; Tati McQuay
- Opening theme: "Hyperlinked"
- Country of origin: United States
- Original language: English
- No. of seasons: 1
- No. of episodes: 10

Production
- Executive producers: Juliette Brindak Blake; Hermine Brindak; Larry Reitzer; Jason Berger; Amy Laslett; Mads Munk; Hermione Ross; Rachel Specter; Audrey Wauchope
- Producers: Doug Bilitch; Danny Daneau; Sarah Dignan
- Production locations: Los Angeles, California
- Editors: Blayne Rabanal; Alex Szabo; Evan Watkins
- Running time: 22 minutes
- Production companies: Disney Digital Network; IT Girls and Friends LLC.

Original release
- Network: YouTube Premium
- Release: May 31 – June 1, 2017

Hyperlinked is an American semi-autobiography web series produced exclusively for YouTube Premium, featuring the now-disbanded music group L2M. The series was created by Juliette Brindak Blake, Hermine Brindak and Larry Reitzer. 10 episodes released on May 31, 2017. The 22-minute-long series is produced and distributed by Disney. The aim of this series was to get young girls into STEM.

The five members of L2M (McKenzie Mack, Tati McQuay, Jenna Raine Simmons, Mariangeli Collado, and Lexi Drew) takes on the roles of five friends in Hyperlinked named Justine, Izzy, Olivia, Juliette, and Ella respectively, along with YouTuber Nicole Laeno frequently recurring as the character Harlie. The 10-episode series follows a groups of girls as they come together to create their own website aimed towards girls, while also dealing with tween issues involving friendship and growing up. The show was written and directed by a women's team.

== Cast ==
- Mariangeli Collado as Juliette, the creator of the website Miss O and Friends, who also hosts the "Answer Girl" segment. The character is based on experiences of the real Juliette Brindak Blake.
- McKenzie Mack as Justine, the primary programmer for Miss O and Friends.
- Jenna Raine Simmons as Olivia, the namesake of Miss O and Friends and Juliette's softball-playing younger sister.
- Lexi Drew as Ella, a fashionista whose parents are divorced.
- Tati McQuay as Izzy, a dancer who frequently is seen on Miss O. McQuay additionally choreographed all of the music videos for the show.
- Nicole Laeno as Harlie, a camera operator for the website's videos and close friend of Olivia's.
- Whitney Avalon and Matt Corboy as Hermine and Paul, Juliette and Olivia's parents.

Additionally, Hayden Summerall, a social media influencer and singer, makes a cameo appearance along with Nadia and Ruby Rose Turner in "Ticket Giveaway", and Juliette Brindak and Susan Wojcicki appear as executives from the fictional tech company Global Tech in "The Offer".

== Episodes ==
No.	Title	Release date
1	"Dance-It-Off"	May 31, 2017
2	"No Easy Fix"	May 31, 2017
3	"Three's a Crowd"	May 31, 2017
4	"Ask A Boy"	May 31, 2017
5	"R.I.P. Computer"	May 31, 2017
6	"It's a Girl's World"	May 31, 2017
7	"Rivals"	May 31, 2017
8	"The Interview"	May 31, 2017
9	"Ticket Giveaway"	May 31, 2017
10	"The Offer"	June 1, 2017
