= Disney Digital Network =

American worldwide multi-channel network

- Formerly: Maker Studios Inc. (2009–2017)
- Type: Subsidiary
- Industry: Entertainment
- Founded: 2009; 17 years ago
- Founders: Ben Donovan; Danny Zappin; Scott Katz; Lisa Donovan; Shay Carl; Philip DeFranco; Kassem Gharaibeh; Derek Jones; Glasgow Phillips; Matthew Clawson; Paul Ballon; Michael Gallagher
- Defunct: April 30, 2019; 7 years ago
- Fate: Dissolved
- Headquarters: Culver City, California, U.S.
- Key people: Andrew Sugerman (CEO)
- Parent: Disney Consumer Products and Interactive Media (2015-2018); Walt Disney Parks, Experiences and Consumer Products (2018-2019)
- Subsidiaries: The Game Station; The Station; Animonster; The Platform; Cartoonium; The Mom View; Maker Music Network; Tutele; Polaris; Revelmode
- Website: makerstudios.com Archived 7 February 2014 at the Wayback Machine (Redirects to disneyadvertising.com) ddn.disney.com (Redirects to disneyadvertising.com)

Disney Digital Network was an American multi-channel network located in Culver City, California. It was originally the successor to Maker Studios, co-founded by Lisa Donovan, Danny Zappin, Scott Katz, Kassem Gharaibeh, Shay Carl, Rawn Erickson II, Ben Donovan, Philip DeFranco, Glasgow Phillips, Michael Gallagher, Matthew Clawson, and Paul Ballon in 2009. Maker Studios was originally conceived as an incubator for YouTube talent through the use of Super Channels like The Station. Maker Studios adopted the multi-channel network (MCN) model after the initial model failed to take root. Maker Studios was acquired by The Walt Disney Company in 2014 for $500 million, and was absorbed into the newly formed Disney Digital Network in 2017.

Outside the United States, the former Maker Studios had significant audiences in the United Kingdom, Brazil, and Australia, and was aiming to expand its Asian operations, where it once had 700 million monthly unique views. Run by René Rechtman (who now runs Moonbug Entertainment), president for the international division, Maker had plans to build a headquarters in London for its commercial, production and marketing activities outside the USA. An Asian hub had been established in Singapore, which offered limited commercial and marketing support before the company was sold to The Walt Disney Company.

Following the Disney acquisition, the company suffered multiple rounds of layoffs, executive shuffling, and partner cut-offs.

== History ==
=== As Maker Studios ===
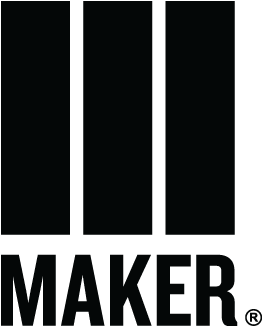
The logo of Maker Studios

==== 2009–2012: Foundation and early years ====
Maker Studios was founded in 2009.

In June 2012, Maker Studios announced that over 1,000 channels signed under the network have received and accumulated over 1.1 billion views for the month of June 2012. At the time, YouTube channels under Maker Studios collectively earned over 90 million subscribers. In October 2012, Maker Studios surpassed Machinima to become the number one independent YouTube network. However, since that time, according to comScore, in December 2012, Fullscreen passed Maker to become the top ranked YouTube-based network.

==== 2012–2013: Ray William Johnson dispute ====
From late 2012 through 2013, Maker Studios and Ray William Johnson were involved in a public feud that received considerable media attention. Maker Studios formerly produced Johnson's Equals Three and Your Favorite Martian series. In October 2012, Johnson announced he would be leaving Maker Studios in an episode of Equals Three. Johnson also formed his own production studio, Runaway Machine (formerly Runaway Planet). Johnson has stated online that he left Maker Studios due to the pressure the company put on him into signing a contract which gave Maker a 40% share of his channel's AdSense revenue and 50% of his show's intellectual property rights. He stated that they were using "thuggish tactics" to pressure him into signing the contract, one of which was allegedly leveraging his AdSense account for the intellectual property rights to Your Favorite Martian. He also claimed that Maker Studios CEO, Danny Zappin, is a convicted felon, which he was not made aware of, when teaming up with Maker Studios. Zappin later publicly admitted to this claim. This was one of the first such publicized contract disputes between a YouTube content creator and their multi-channel network.

In December 2012, Maker announced that it had closed a $36 million round of financing led by Time Warner Investments.

==== 2014: Acquisition by Disney ====
On March 24, 2014, Maker Studios, Inc. agreed to sell itself to The Walt Disney Company for $500 million, rising to $950 million if financial milestones were met. On April 14, 2014, Relativity Media submitted a competing bid of up to $1.1 billion, but Maker denied the bid. In 2014, Jukin Media partnered with Maker Studios, giving Maker Studios access to Jukin's library of video clips, and giving Jukin access to Maker's operational resources, The partnership also resulted in the launch of a dedicated website for FailArmy, Jukin's owned and operated entertainment brand. In December 2015, the company became a subsidiary of Disney Consumer Products and the Disney Interactive division of The Walt Disney Company. The Network also partnered with Fusion TV in a deal that fell under the corporate umbrella of The Walt Disney Company.

=== As Disney Digital Networks ===
In February 2017, Maker Studios had around 60,000 YouTube partnerships, but announced that it intends to reduce this to about 1,000. Many partnered YouTubers had been unhappy with the terms of their contracts, including difficulty with ending contracts. On May 2, 2017, Disney absorbed the studio into the newly formed Disney Digital Network.

On January 19, 2018, Twitch signed a deal with Disney to secure exclusive content from some of the entertainment giant's top YouTubers, including Markiplier, Jacksepticeye, Strawburry17 and LuzuGames. A total of four YouTubers (with a combined total of over 44 million subscribers), are involved in the deal, and each will manage their own channels on Twitch.

== Key personnel ==
Courtney Holt was the chief strategy officer of Maker Studios. Due to Danny Zappin stepping down as the company's CEO, Ynon Kreiz, former CEO and chairman of Endemol became the CEO of Maker Studios in May 2013. Prior to Kreiz becoming the CEO of Maker, he was the company's chairman. Ryan Lissack is the current CTO of Maker Studios. In December 2015, Courtney Holt replaced Ynon Kreiz as CEO, coming a year after Disney's acquisition of the group.

== Channels ==
=== Animonster ===
Animonster was an animation channel co-founded by Maker and Cosmic Toast Studios, which premiered shows such as Your Favorite Martian: The Series, Powerhouse, and Dino Yacht Club. In 2013, the channel ceased uploading.

=== Cartoonium ===
Cartoonium was an animation channel, launched on April 19, 2013 which focused on children programming.

== Content ==
Maker Studios produced videos for channels on YouTube, including Consider the Source, Tessa Violet, Chuggaaconroy, Yves Bole, KassemG, Timothy DeLaGhetto, Shimmy AP, Nice Peter and EpicLLOYD's Epic Rap Battles of History (seasons 1-5), Joseph Garrett's Wonder Quest and I Wonder, Pugatory, and LORE in a Minutes! KingManProds, Sam Macaroni, along with several others that have almost as many viewers as Nickelodeon. Maker's first three channels produced for YouTube included Maker Music Network, Tutele, and The Mom's View, with both Maker Music Network and Tutele channels shutting down within six months of their launch. Maker Studios have also signed celebrities such as famous rapper Snoop Dogg and his YouTube channel WestFestTV, actor Robert De Niro's Tribeca Enterprises, and Kevin Smith.

In 2013, the most popular Maker production was Epic Rap Battles of History, which averaged 30 million views an episode. Maker's most successful channel was PewDiePie, who was the most-subscribed user on YouTube. He was signed under the Maker sub-network Polaris and later Revelmode until February 13, 2017, when Maker dropped him as a result of the international backlash to jokes and actions that media outlets widely described as antisemitic. During his time with the network, Maker produced his YouTube Red (now YouTube Premium) show Scare PewDiePie with Skybound Entertainment. Disney Digital Network in 2017 produced Hyperlinked, a series distributed on YouTube Red and based on the story of the social network Miss O and Friends, and Club Mickey Mouse, a reboot of The Mickey Mouse Club airing exclusively online on social media.

== Brands ==
- Oh My Disney
- Disney Style
- Babble
- Disney Family
- Disney Eats
- The Game Station
- Polaris
- The Platform
- Animonster
- The Station
- Cartoonium
- The Mom View
- Tutele
- Maker Music Network

== Television shows ==
- Disney FHO - Friends Hanging Out (2015–2016)
- Polaris Primetime (2017)
- Player Select (Polaris: Player Select for first season) (2017–2020)
- Parker Plays (2017–2018)
- Club Mickey Mouse (2017–2018)
- Legend of the Three Caballeros (2018)
- Disney Dream Job: Game Designer (2018 TV Special)
- Disney Comics in Motion (2018–2019)

== See also ==
- List of YouTubers
- List of multi-channel networks
