= Distractify =

Online publication and Internet media company launched in 2013

- Website type: Online publication
- Available in: English
- Founded: 2013; 13 years ago
- Website: distractify.com
- Commercial: Yes
- Registration: No
- Launched: 2013; 13 years ago
- Current status: Active

Distractify is an online publication and Internet media company launched in 2013 by Quinn Hu (also known as the YouTuber 2 Bucks), Yosef Lerner, and Jake Heppner. The company started as a social media startup for viral content and later branched out into news about pop culture.

== History ==
Founded by Quinn Hu, Yosef Lerner, and Jake Heppner, Distractify began in 2013 as a social media startup for viral content. The site reached 21 million unique visitors in November 2013. In 2013, 90% of traffic to the site came from Facebook. Distractify competes with BuzzFeed, Upworthy, and ViralNova.

In 2014, Distractify saw a drop in Facebook traffic after Facebook began to lower reach for meme-related posts. The site received $7 million in funding that year.

In 2017, Distractify filed a federal lawsuit against Brainjolt, which owns "22 Words", for publishing content which was similar to some of Distractify's content. Distractify has been sued in the past on behalf of photographers for alleged copyright violations concerning the use of their photographs.
