= Top Toy =

Top Toy may refer to:

- Spinning top, a toy with a squat body and a sharp point at the bottom
- Top Toy, a subsidiary of MINISO specializing in the retail of toys
