= Danny Zappin =

American businessman (born 1975)

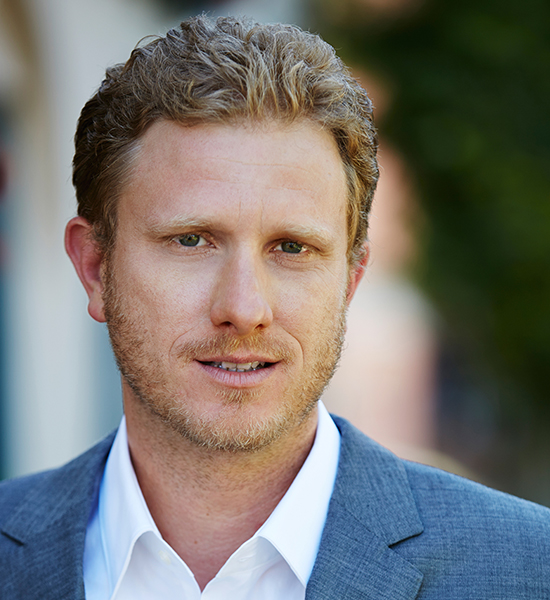
- Zappin in 2015
- Born: 1975 (age 50–51); Columbus, Ohio, U.S.
- Education: Ohio State University
- Occupations: Originally founder of Maker Studios (2009–2013); Founder, president & CEO, Zealot Networks (2014–2016)
- Years active: 2004–present

Danny Zappin (born 1975) is an American businessman and entrepreneur. He was originally founder of Maker Studios, and the founder, president and CEO of Zealot Networks.

== Early life and education ==
Danny Zappin was born in Columbus, Ohio. His mother ran a Christian heavy-metal record label. His brother is hip hop artist John Reuben. He spent a few quarters at Ohio State University before moving to Florida. In the mid-1990s, he moved to New York, and then to Los Angeles to pursue a career as an actor. He had a small role in the 1999 Spike Lee film Summer of Sam. In 2001, Zappin was convicted of felony drug possession for smuggling ecstasy. He was sentenced to two years in prison, and released to home confinement in 2004.

== Career ==
=== Internet videos ===
Zappin began creating videos for the Internet in the early 2000s, while working for CrapTV, an early online video streaming website. In mid-2005, he began uploading videos to the then new website YouTube under the name Danny Diamond. Along with several other YouTube content creators, he began signing up online talent to create a digital studio for YouTube.

=== Maker Studios ===
In 2009, Zappin co-founded the YouTube multichannel network and online video producer Maker Studios, serving as its CEO until his resignation in April 2013. Founded in Venice, California, Maker was one of the first content providers on YouTube to reach 1 million views. By the end of 2012, Maker was one of the top five networks on YouTube, with over 2 billion views per month, according to comScore. The idea behind Maker was to create a new type of studio model, a collaborative, creator-friendly multichannel network helping to boost views and better monetize online short-form content. Zappin is considered to be one of the first to recognize the platform's potential for new types of content and talent.

Zappin's legal history came up in the midst of a 2012 dispute between Maker Studios and YouTube celebrity Ray William Johnson over the terms of a new contract.

In June 2013, two months after his resignation, Zappin sued Maker Studios' partners and investors, alleging there was a conspiracy to oust him from the board. Along with three other former Maker executives, he sued Maker for a second time in April 2014, to block a shareholder vote on the acquisition of the company by the Walt Disney Company, shortly after the studio agreed to purchase Maker in a deal worth up to $950 million. The lawsuit was rejected by a California judge and the sale went through. Zappin earned $25 million in the sale.

On October 17, 2013, Zappin announced that he had acquired digital entertainment news website NewMediaRockstars, intending to broaden its coverage of new media.

=== Zealot Networks ===
In the summer of 2014, Zappin raised $25 million from former and current Maker employees, talent and executives, along with his own money, to form Zealot Networks. In an August 2014 press release, Zappin announced the launch of his new digital media company, "a digital-first media company and growth accelerator." By the end of the year, Zealot had raised additional capital from UK broadcaster ITV, the largest commercial television network in the UK. Zealot was based in Venice, California, with Zappin serving as the company's president and CEO.

Zappin stated that the company was a continuation of his work with content creators at multi-channel network Maker Studios. Rather than focusing solely on YouTube talent, Zealot was a multi-company network, made up of a variety of interconnected digital media companies with different areas of expertise working together in an effort to accelerate their collective growth.

By November 2016, the company had raised $26.5 million in venture capital and an additional $30 million in debt financing. It used that money to buy 17 other content generating companies with a combination of cash and equity, including ViralNova for $100 million in 2015. Other acquisitions had included a majority stake in content-licensing company AudioMicro, the parent company AdRev in December 2014 for approximately $20 million, Premier Sports & Entertainment in January 2015, Converge Media Group and Neighbor Agency and Idea Farmer in February 2015, Threshold Interactive in March 2015, and in May 2015, Lord Danger and Hutch Media.

By the end of 2016 the company was in financial trouble, and had asked its executives to forgo being paid and a team of current and former executives offered to buy Zappin out. Zealot's website went down in November 2016.

In April 2017, BumpClick, which had at some point acquired ViralNova from Zealot, was sold to Function(x) for $25M.

In January 2018, AVL Digital Group acquired AudioMicro and its AdRev and DashGo divisions from an unnamed party for an unnamed price.
