= Ximivogue =

Chinese discount store

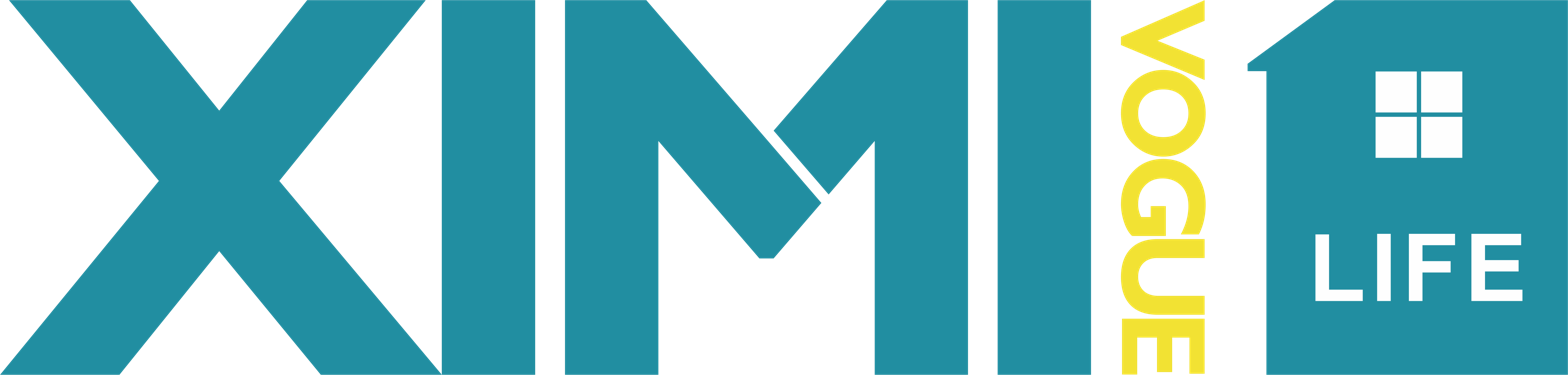

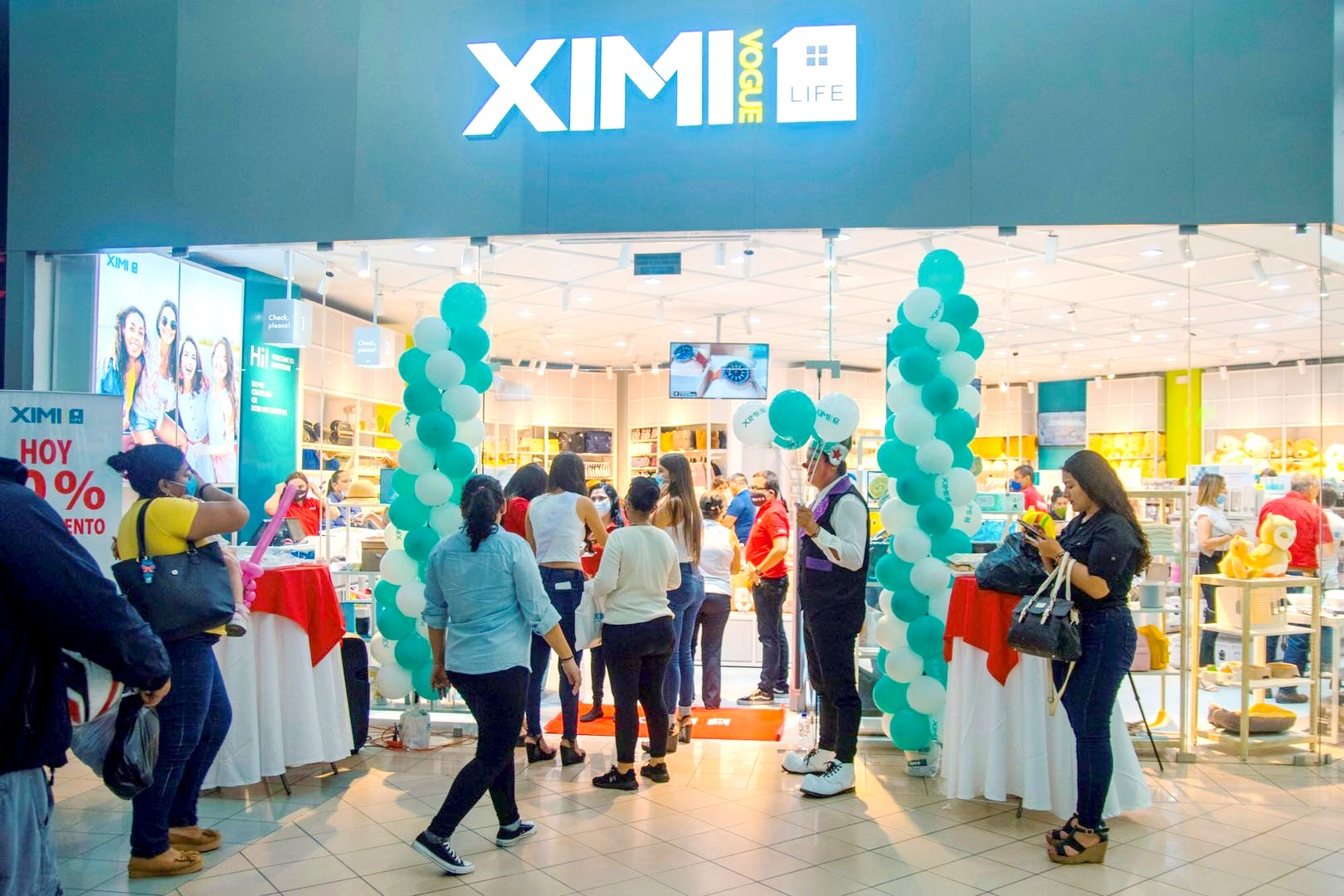
- A XIMIVOGUE FMCG retail store in Nicaragua.
- Industry: Fashion
- Founded: 2015
- Area served: Worldwide
- Website: www.ximiso.com

Ximivogue (simplified Chinese: 熙美诚品; traditional Chinese: 熙美誠品; stylized XIMI VOGUE or "XIMIVOGUE"), also spelled "Ximi Vogue" and known as XIMISO, is a Korean-inspired fast-fashion brand founded in 2015. Its headquarters are in Tianhe District, Guangzhou, and it also has offices in Hangzhou and Yiwu. It mainly provides products and services related to daily life, similar to Japanese 100 Yen stores or dollar stores.

Ximivogue entered the Colombia and Panama market in 2019. Ximivogue has expanded outside of the Chinese market and operates 1,400 stores in Asia, Europe, Australia, North America, and South America.

== History ==
Ximivogue was established in 2015 as a Korean lifestyle brand, alongside other similar international retailers like Miniso, Mumuso.

In July 2018, the retailer set foot in the market of Sri Lanka.

In 2019, Ximivogue stepped into Brunei, Bulgaria and Canada.

In July 2019, Ximivogue and Mongolian Uukhai Skateboarding Association jointly organized a competition for amateur skaters and skateboarders.

In July 2020, Ximivogue opened its first store in Jakarta, Indonesia.
