= Pugatory =

American animated web series

- Genre: Dark fantasy
- Created by: Marzia Bisognin
- Written by: Ryan Burns; Patrick Muhlberger; Ryan Sandoval; Lily Sparks
- Story by: Marzia Bisognin; Wendy Wills
- Directed by: Jonathan Eden
- Voices of: Marzia Bisognin; PewDiePie; Ted Evans
- Composer: Marquis W. Howell II
- Country of origin: United States
- Original language: English
- No. of episodes: 6

Production
- Executive producers: Marzia Bisognin; Neely Shamam
- Running time: 3–5 minutes
- Production company: Maker Studios

Original release
- Network: YouTube
- Release: October 31 – December 19, 2015

Pugatory is an American animated web series created by Marzia Bisognin and produced by Maker Studios.
