= Wonder Quest =

Edutainment children's web series

- Title card
- Genre: Edutainment
- Created by: Joseph Garrett
- Written by: Joseph Garrett; Patrick Muhlberger; Ryan Burns
- Starring: Joseph Garrett; Adam Clarke; Shay Carl
- Composers: Seth Earnest; Duke Westlake
- Countries of origin: United Kingdom; United States
- Original language: English
- No. of seasons: 2
- No. of episodes: 24

Production
- Producer: Patrick Muhlberger
- Production company: Maker Studios

Original release
- Network: YouTube
- Release: April 25, 2015 – November 5, 2016

Wonder Quest is an edutainment children's web series from Disney's Maker Studios. It was created by Joseph Garrett, a prominent YouTube commentator who posts videos primarily set in the sandbox game Minecraft as his internet persona "Stampy Cat". The series was scripted by Patrick Muhlberger, Ryan Burns, and Garrett, and produced by Muhlberger. The Minecraft educational content was initially developed by Adam Clarke, who stars alongside Garrett as his own persona, "Wizard Keen".

Featured on the Wonder Quest YouTube channel, Maker Studios described the series as a spinoff series of Joseph Garrett's main YouTube channel, starring the character Stampy Cat. Citing the runaway success of Minecraft as inspiration for Wonder Quest at the MIPTV television industry conference in Cannes, Garrett states that "if you take their engagement and put it into a more productive space like education or the arts, they're going to be involved in that, they're going to be engaged".

Wonder Quest premiered on April 25, 2015. By December 2016, the series had garnered over 101 million views. The first episode of season 2 was released on August 20, 2016. The series ended on a cliffhanger on November 5, 2016. Several years later, all episodes were privated on their YouTube channel.

== Synopsis ==
Wonder Quest follows the anthropomorphic Stampy Cat and sorcerer Wizard Keen, who go on many adventures to stop various forces of evil from destroying a magic gem, called the Wonder Gem.

== Series overview ==
Season	Episodes	Originally released	
Season	Episodes	First released	Last released
1	12	April 25, 2015	July 11, 2015
2	12	August 20, 2016	November 5, 2016

=== Season 1 (2015) ===
Set in the town of Wonderberg, Stampy Cat and his newly acquainted friend, Wizard Keen, try to save the town from his evil wizard brother, Heinous. Together, they set off on an adventure to piece back together the 5 wonderments of the wonder gem to bring back wonder in Wonderberg, and they encounter trouble along the way.

=== Season 2 (2016) ===
Stampy Cat and Wizard Keen receive a mysterious invitation to the Society of Wonderers. As new members of the society, the Head Wonderer, Priscilla, charges the duo to spread wonder and guard Wonderberg from evil forces. They encounter Rama, a rejected member of the society who changed the past to stop the world's greatest wonderers from wondering. Using a time machine, the team sets off on another adventure to bring back wonder to the present.

== Voice cast ==
- Joseph Garrett as Stampy Cat
- Adam Clarke as Wizard Keen
- Shay Carl as Heinous
- Patrick Muhlberger as Flunky
- Ryan Burns as Lackey
- Lydia Winters as Priscilla
- Rachel Staman as Rama

== Production and release ==
Wonder Quest was first announced by Joseph Garrett at the MIPTV television industry conference in April 2015. The series is a partnership between Joseph Garrett and Maker Studios. YouTube secured rights as the exclusive distributor of the series, as its parent company Google pushed for a wider coverage of children's content on their video streaming site.

The series takes on a different format to Garrett's normal slate of videos: "It's different to my normal videos just playing and talking about Minecraft. It's a completely scripted show, and the production values are much higher: there's an original score and lots of sound effects and overlays.". Additionally, the series is pitched as an educational show for children, however Garrett stressed that entertainment is the main priority: "There's no point having an educational show if nobody's going to watch it".

The original Minecraft maps were built by The Voxelbox, Blockworks and Johan "Dragnoz" Kruger. The original soundtrack was composed by Seth Earnest.

Wonder Quest premiered on April 25, 2015. Episodes were released on a weekly schedule with an animated I Wonder episode.

As part of YouTube Gaming's virtual reality initiative, season 2 of Wonder Quest includes content uploaded in 360° video. Installments of the virtual reality content immerses fans in interactive games, stories, and rides.

== I Wonder ==
Every Wonder Quest episode is accompanied by an episode of a short animated side series called I Wonder, also produced by Maker Studios. The short series, each episode lasting around three minutes in length, features Stampy Cat and Wizard Keen investigating educational topics explored in each corresponding Wonder Quest episode. The supervising producer is Cella Duffy and the co-directors are Josh Bitzer and TJ Fuller. Original music for I Wonder is composed by Duke Westlake.

== Side Quest ==
Side Quest is a companion series for Wonder Quest featured on Garrett's main channel, stampylonghead. Unlike Wonder Quest and I Wonder, this series uses the Let's Play format. In this series, Stampy explores the world of Wonderberg with Wizard Keen and other characters.

== Awards ==
Year	Award	Category	Result
2016	Webby Awards	Video Channels and Networks – Gaming	Nominated
2016	Kidscreen Awards	Best Web/App Series	Nominated
