= ViralNova =

ViralNova is a curation site for clickbait, launched in May 2013. John Hermann of BuzzFeed described ViralNova as a connection between "the dark internet — chain-letter internet — and Facebook".

Run by Scott DeLong, ViralNova was sold to Zealot Networks on 9 July 2015 for $100 million. Zealot sold ViralNova to BumpClick, in April 2017 Function(x) announced that it was buying BumpClick for $25M. The lower value reflected declining site visitors.
