= Ye Guofu =

Chinese entrepreneur and businessman (born 1977)

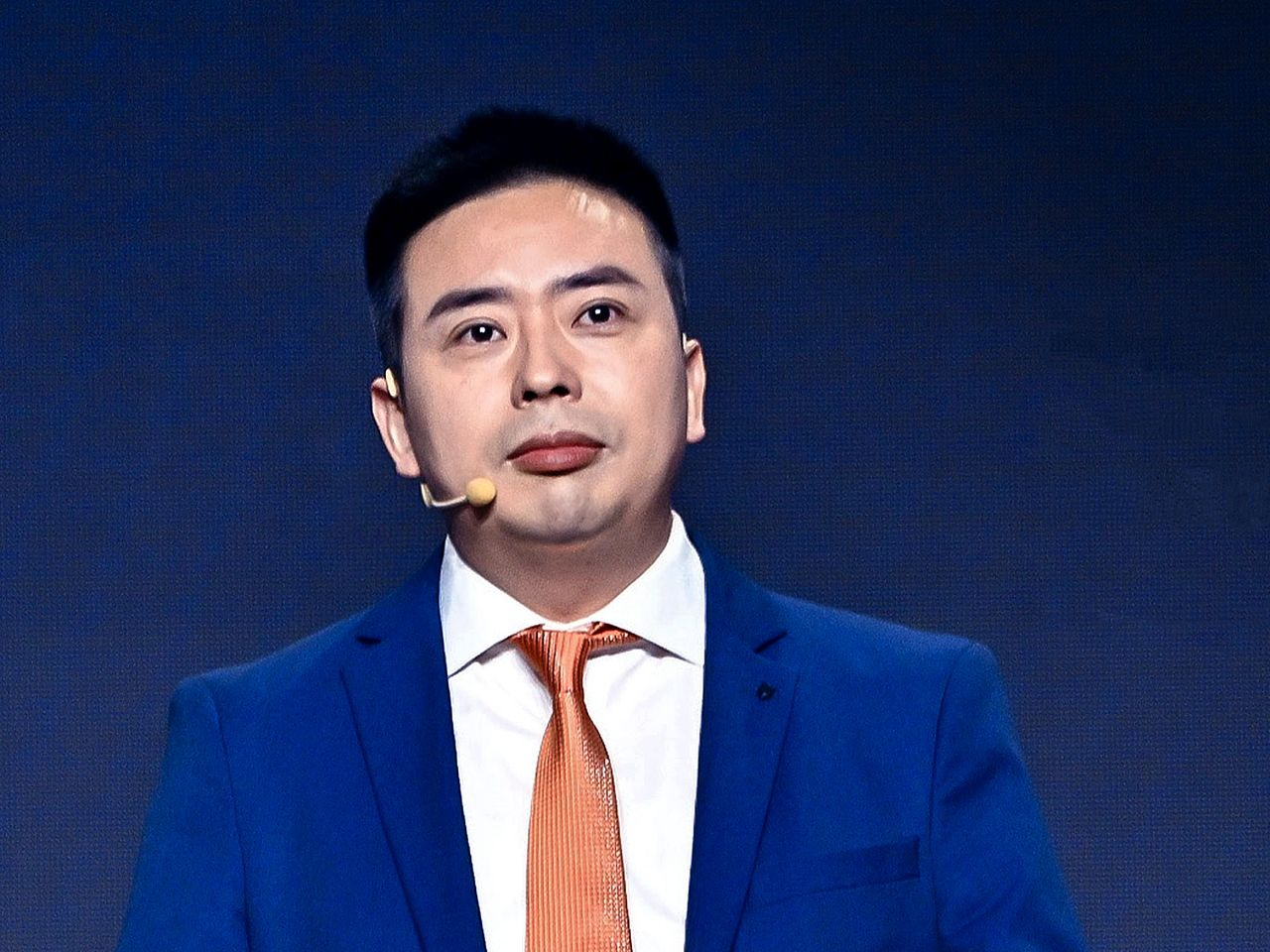
- Ye Guofu speaking at a business summit in 2024
- Born: November 1977 (age 48); Shiyan, Hubei
- Education: Diploma in Economic Management, Zhongnan University of Economics and Law, 2000
- Occupation: Entrepreneur
- Years active: 2000–present
- Known for: Founder of MINISO, representative of the 12th Guangdong Province People's Congress
- Spouse: Yang Yunyun

Ye Guofu (Chinese: 叶国富; pinyin: Yè Guófù; born November 1977) is a Chinese billionaire entrepreneur who is the founder, chairman, and CEO of lifestyle retail group MINISO. Ye is the first Chinese person to own a chain store with extensive global presence.

== Biography ==
Ye Guofu attended Zhongnan University of Economics and Law where he earned a diploma in economic management. After his graduation in 2000, Ye moved to Guangzhou where MINISO's headquarters is located and began his entrepreneurial career. During this time, Guofu met his wife Yang Yunyun, a fellow Chinese entrepreneur and billionaire who is the vice president of MINISO.

Ye engaged in multiple businesses in retail sector including a store - 10-yuan shop Aiyaya, which sold all its products below 10 yuan. In 2013, Guofu founded MINISO, formerly known as Mingchuangyoupin. The company began operations in a basement garage in Guangzhou. In 2015, Guofu expanded his company MINISO into international market with a shop in Singapore. During the COVID-19 pandemic, Guofu led the execution of a more aggressive overseas expansion strategy of MINISO. The company went public on the NYSE in October 2020 and on the HKEX in June 2022.

Ye served as a representative of the 12th Guangdong Province People's Congress and as the vice-chairman of the 12th Federation of Industry and Commerce of Liwan District, Guangzhou. He also serves as the chairman of Shiyan Chamber of Commerce in Shenzhen and teaches at Peking University.

Ye was awarded the 'Top 10 Influential Brander of the Year 2018'. He was named China's TOP50 Young Business Leaders and ranked 148th in Forbes' 2020 China Rich List and "Top 500 Chinese Brand Characters 2021. Guofu and his wife Yang Yunyun were ranked 118th in Hurun China Rich list 2023. Guofu ranked 690th in Hurun Global Rich list 2024. In 2024, he was named Forbes China Best CEO of the year (2024) and was listed in the 2024 Forbes Global Billionaires List with a Net Worth of 2.2 Billion dollars.

== Philanthropy ==
In early 2020, upon the outbreak of the COVID-19 pandemic, Ye donated protective supplies and daily necessities worth 3 million yuan to his hometown Shiyan City in Hubei Province and advocated for more supplies from his peers as the chairman of Shiyan Chamber of Commerce in Shenzhen.
