= New Rockstars =

American YouTube channel

YouTube information
- Channel: New Rockstars
- Years active: 2014-present
- Genres: Film and television analysis
- Subscribers: 4.44 million

New Rockstars is an American YouTube channel dedicated to film and television analysis, particularly of the Star Wars, Marvel, and DC franchises. It is hosted by Erik Voss and Jessica Clemons. The company originally existed as NewMediaRockstars (NMR), an American online magazine primarily covering YouTube creators, which closed in 2013 before being relaunched in 2014 as a Youtube channel.

== History ==
=== NewMediaRockstars (2011-2013) ===
NewMediaRockstars was started by Benny Luo towards the end of 2011 as a magazine covering new media, primarily YouTubers. In August 2013, its investor pulled funding, and it was forced to shut down.

=== Acquisition and Rebrand ===
In October 2013, Luo sold the online magazine to Danny Zappin. When Zappin acquired NewMediaRockstars in 2013, his stated aim was to make the magazine the leader in covering new media: "The plan is to broaden NMR's business model so that it can be to new media and online video what Entertainment Weekly was to the film, TV, and book business when EW launched in the early 1990s." In 2014, screenwriter and producer, Rory Haines was appointed CEO with the aim of expanding NMR into producing more video content. That same year Filup Molina took over all operations for NewMediaRockstars and rebranded the company as New Rockstars, with the YouTube channel becoming its primary publication platform.

== Content ==
New Rockstars creates analyses of film and television, including trailer and episode breakdowns, discussions of easter eggs, and fan theories. The channel is hosted by Erik Voss and Jessica Clemons, who also host Sneak Peak, a podcast covering entertainment news.
