= Lisa Donovan =

American YouTuber

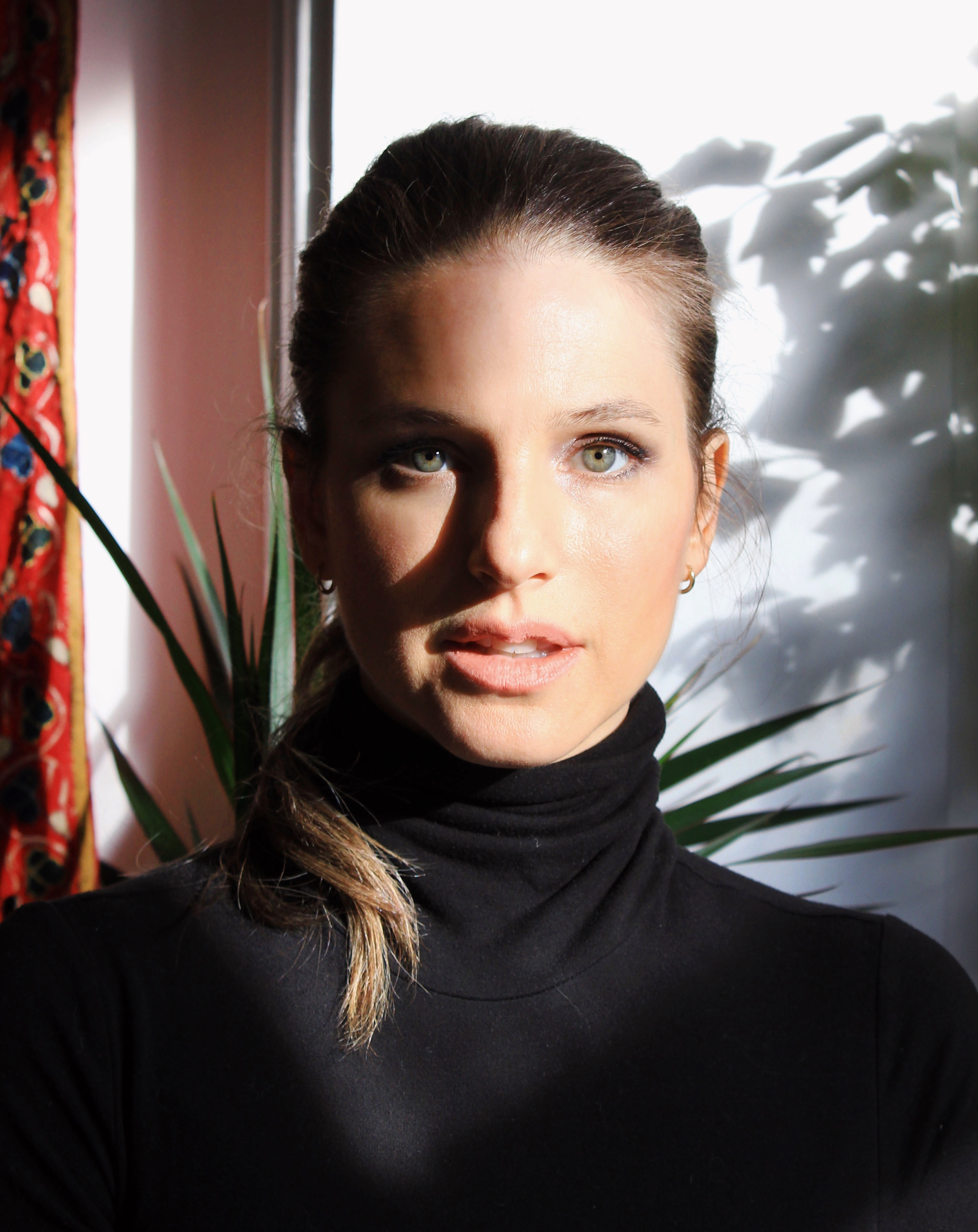
- Donovan in 2021
- Born: June 11, 1980 (age 46); New York City, U.S.
- Other name: LisaNova (on YouTube)
- Occupations: Entrepreneur, actress, YouTuber
- Years active: 2006–present
- Known for: The Pattern, Maker Studios
- Website: thepattern.com

Lisa Donovan (born June 11, 1980) is an American former YouTuber. She is a founder of Zappin Productions, a production company that specialized in viral videos, as well as the founder and CEO of The Pattern, an astrology-based personality app.

Donovan began her career as one of YouTube's earliest content creators and was subsequently one of the co-founders of Maker Studios, a YouTube video network which was purchased in 2015 by The Walt Disney Company for $675M. The network was absorbed by Disney in 2017 to become Disney Digital Network.

== Early life ==
Donovan grew up in Scarsdale, New York. She was a student at the University of Colorado at Boulder before moving to Los Angeles, California.

== Career ==
=== YouTube ===
Donovan made her first YouTube channel in September 2005 and uploaded her first video, "Introducing LisaNova," a reel of facial clips in black-and-white accompanied by the Charles Aznavour song Non, je n'ai rien oublié, to YouTube on June 7, 2006. She has parodied a number of celebrities and public figures; her impersonation of Sarah Palin was praised in Wired as "ruthlessly hilarious", and in 2008 Ralph Nader made a guest appearance in one of the skits. In a Forbes magazine article, YouTube founder Chad Hurley highlighted Donovan's success as an example of the changing paradigm of entertainment. Donovan is also a co-creator of the popular YouTube channel 'The Game Station', which led to her co-founding the YouTube network Maker Studios.

=== Acting ===
Donovan was one of the first YouTube content creators to cross over to mainstream Hollywood when she was cast on MADtv in 2006. She debuted in a spoof of The Ellen DeGeneres Show, where she played Salma Hayek, the producer of the ABC comedy Ugly Betty, and Rosie O'Donnell. The episode aired on February 17, 2007. After signing a contract and only appearing in four episodes of MADtv, she left the following season.

In 2015, she played the role of the flight attendant in Jeremy Garelick's The Wedding Ringer.

=== Maker Studios ===
Donovan co-founded and served as a board member for Maker Studios, a multi-channel network. Maker Studios was sold to The Walt Disney Company in 2014.

=== The Pattern ===
Donovan is the founder and CEO of The Pattern, an astrology-based personality app. In 2021, Donovan announced that The Pattern intends to launch a dating product called Connect.

== See also ==
- List of YouTube personalities
