= MINISO =

Chinese variety retailer

MINISO Group Holding Limited

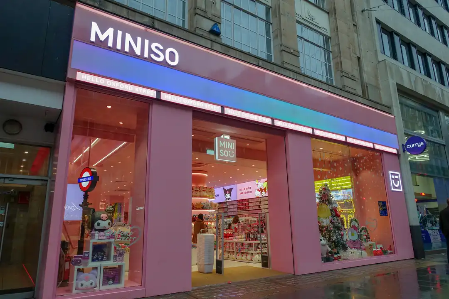
- A MINISO retail store in London, England
- Trade name: MINISO
- Native name: 名创优品
- Type: Public
- Traded as: NYSE: MNSO; SEHK: 9896
- Industry: Variety store
- Founded: 2013; 13 years ago
- Founders: Ye Guofu
- Headquarters: Guangzhou, Guangdong, China
- Area served: Worldwide
- Revenue: ▲US$2.45 billion (FY2025)
- Website: miniso.com

MINISO Group Holding Limited (simplified Chinese: 名创优品; pinyin: Míngchuàng Yōupǐn), trading as MINISO is a Chinese retailer and variety store chain that specializes in household and consumer goods including cosmetics, stationery, toys, and kitchenware featuring IP design. Founded in 2013 by Ye Guofu, its headquarters are in Haizhu District, Guangzhou. In 2025, the company's sales revenue reached $2.45 billion.

MINISO has expanded outside of the Chinese market and operates over 7,000 stores including designer toy brand – TOPTOY stores and 6,868 MINISO stores in Asia, Europe, Oceania, Africa, North America, and South America. Sustainalytics and Morningstar ESG risk rating rank MINISO as "Low Risk".

== History ==
MINISO opened its first pilot store in Guangzhou, China in 2013, near its factory. It then expanded to Hong Kong, Singapore, and Malaysia before opening several stores in Sydney, Australia. The company was co-founded by Chinese entrepreneur Ye Guofu in 2013. According to Ye, the brand's early product designs were developed in collaboration with a Japanese designer. However, some media outlets have questioned the authenticity or existence of this designer, suggesting a lack of verifiable information or public records regarding their identity.

The company initially employed a Japanese-influenced branding strategy, despite previously operating under Chinese company Aiyaya. MINISO's first overseas store was opened in Singapore in 2015, two years since its debut in Guangzhou. MINISO has since expanded outside of the Chinese market and operates 6,868 in Asia, Europe, Oceania, Africa, North America, and South America.

In January 2017, MINISO announced that they were seeking to enter the North Korean market, opening their first store in Pyongyang four months later. According to The Economist, the store was popular among the country's wealthy but only accepted foreign currency, including the US dollar, Chinese yuan, and euro as payment. Soon after opening, the company's Japanese branch came under pressure for violating United Nations Security Council Resolution 2321 prohibiting trade with North Korea, distanced themselves from the move, and blamed the Chinese offices for the decision. As a result of the controversy, MINISO promised not to ship any more products to North Korea and the Pyongyang store was rebranded as "Evolution".

In September 2018, MINISO received its first external strategic investment funding of one billion RMB from Tencent and Hillhouse Funding Group. On December 18, 2018, MINISO Canada filed for bankruptcy. In March 2019, MINISO China took over the operations of MINISO Canada. On March 13, 2019, MINISO partnered with Marvel to introduce a range of themed products. MINISO went public on the NYSE in October 2020 under the name MNSO.

In December 2020, MINISO launched a toy brand called TOP TOY, with its first global flagship store located in Guangzhou, Guangdong. In August 2022, MINISO apologized for "wrong brand positioning and marketing", admitting that the company was a "proud Chinese brand through and through", and said it would remove its Japanese inspired elements (including their katakana logo, メイソウ MEISOU) by March 2023. In 2023, MINISO released new brand strategies including launching different store types such as IP-themed stores, "super stores" and national flagship stores and changed the font on the logo. Their stores have been revamped, removing most Japanese references, and are much larger in size for more products. In May 2024, MINISO ceased operations in the Republic of Ireland and went into administration in Australia for the second time in four years.

As of June 2024, MINISO has established collaborations with over 100 intellectual properties, including Disney, Sanrio, Barbie, Sesame Street, Minions, Pokémon, Harry Potter, Care Bears, Peanuts, Tom and Jerry, Teletubbies, Strawberry Shortcake, We Bare Bears, My Little Pony, Chiikawa, The Powerpuff Girls and the Beijing Palace Museum. The company currently operates four design centers in China, the United States, Japan, and South Korea. It has launched over 10,000 stock keeping units (SKUs) related to intellectual properties. After partnering with Mattel Inc. since 2022 and releasing Barbie-themed products since 2023, MINISO acquired several percent of Mattel's shares. The acquisition was officially announced at the Barbie 65th anniversary celebrations in April 2024. Also in 2024, MINISO opened its largest Barbie-themed store in Malaysia and Vietnam, attended by both Mattel and MINISO's directors and staff.

On 9 December 2024, Mirage Retail Group, the operator of MINISO Netherlands stores, was declared bankrupt. In February 2025, Mirage Retail Group put MINISO Netherlands up for sale.

== Global expansion ==
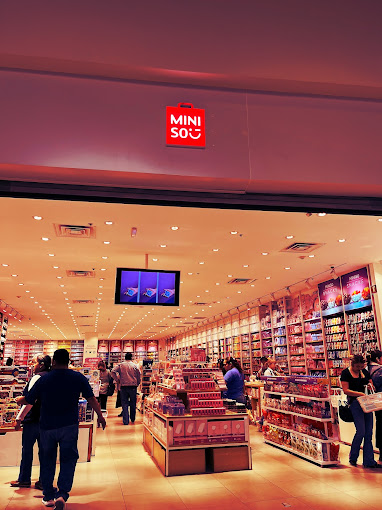
MINISO in Tijuana, Mexico

MINISO first established a retail presence in China, and the majority of its stores still operate there. It has pursued an aggressive expansion plan in countries connected with China's One Belt One Road economic policy, alongside other similar international retailers like Mumuso, XIMIVOGUE, YOYOSO, USUPSO and LÄTT LIV, with shopping malls sometimes having several rival stores.

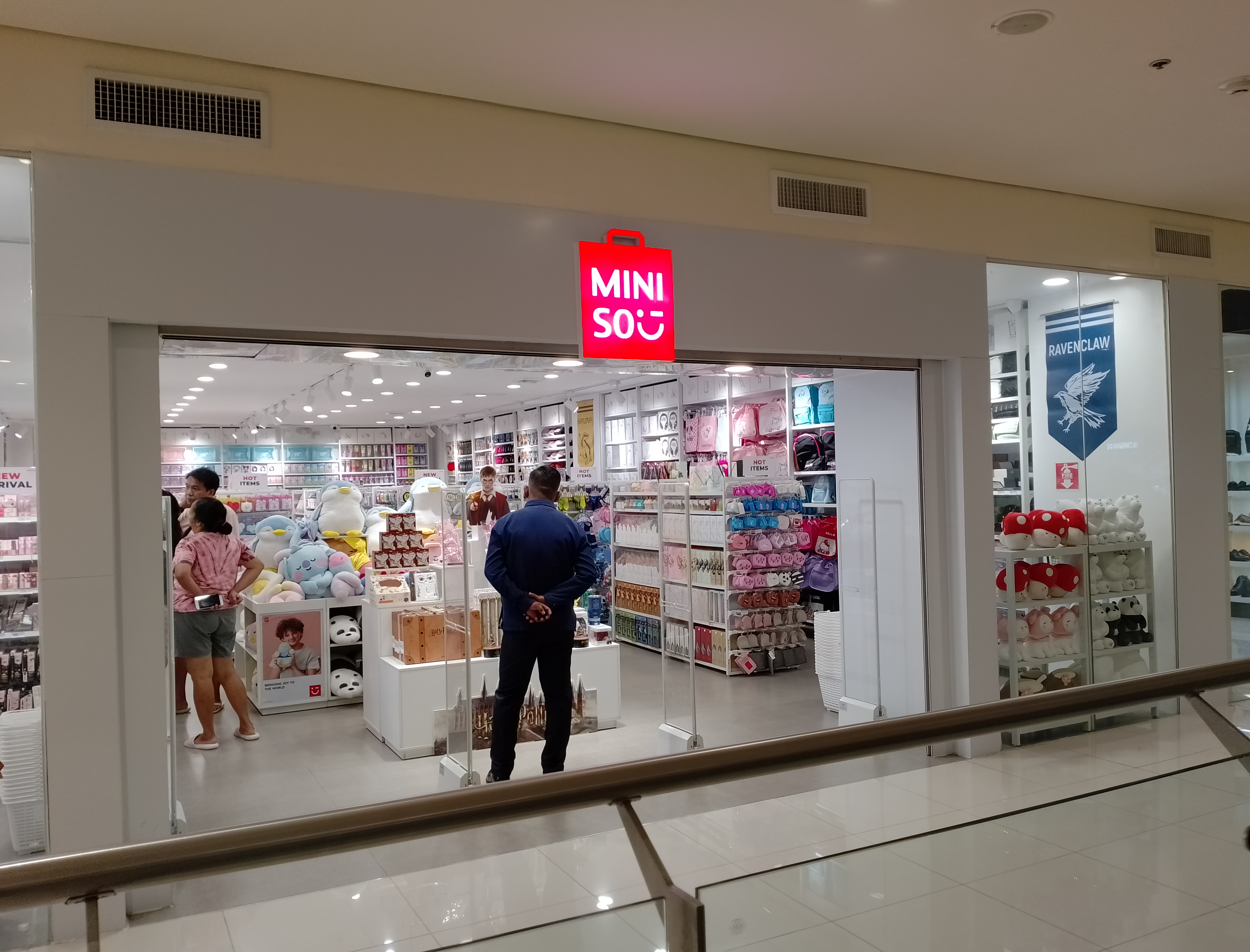
Miniso in Cebu City, Philippines

It first began expanding in Asian countries and regions, including Taiwan, Hong Kong, Cambodia, Nepal, Macau, India, Pakistan, Mongolia, Kazakhstan, South Korea, North Korea, Indonesia, Malaysia, Singapore, Vietnam, Sri Lanka, the Philippines, Thailand and Bangladesh. Sales in one store in Vietnam on its opening day exceeded $10,000 in one hour. Its Japanese branch closed in 2020 due to the pandemic. MINISO's store in Pyongyang was the first and only foreign-branded chain store in North Korea. It opened its first Australian store in early 2017.

On 27 May 2016, MINISO opened its first Thai store in Seacon Square Srinakarin, Bangkok, operating under the name of Miniso (Thailand) Company Limited, which Singtai Trading Company Limited is the sole importer. Currently, MINISO has a total of 52 branches in Thailand.

MINISO currently operates 294 stores in North America and 598 in Latin America. Its first U.S. store opened in Pasadena, California in April 2017.

In Central America, MINISO opened its first store in Panama in 2018. They had opened four more stores there by October that year. They also started operations in Costa Rica in 2019, where there are currently 10 stores.

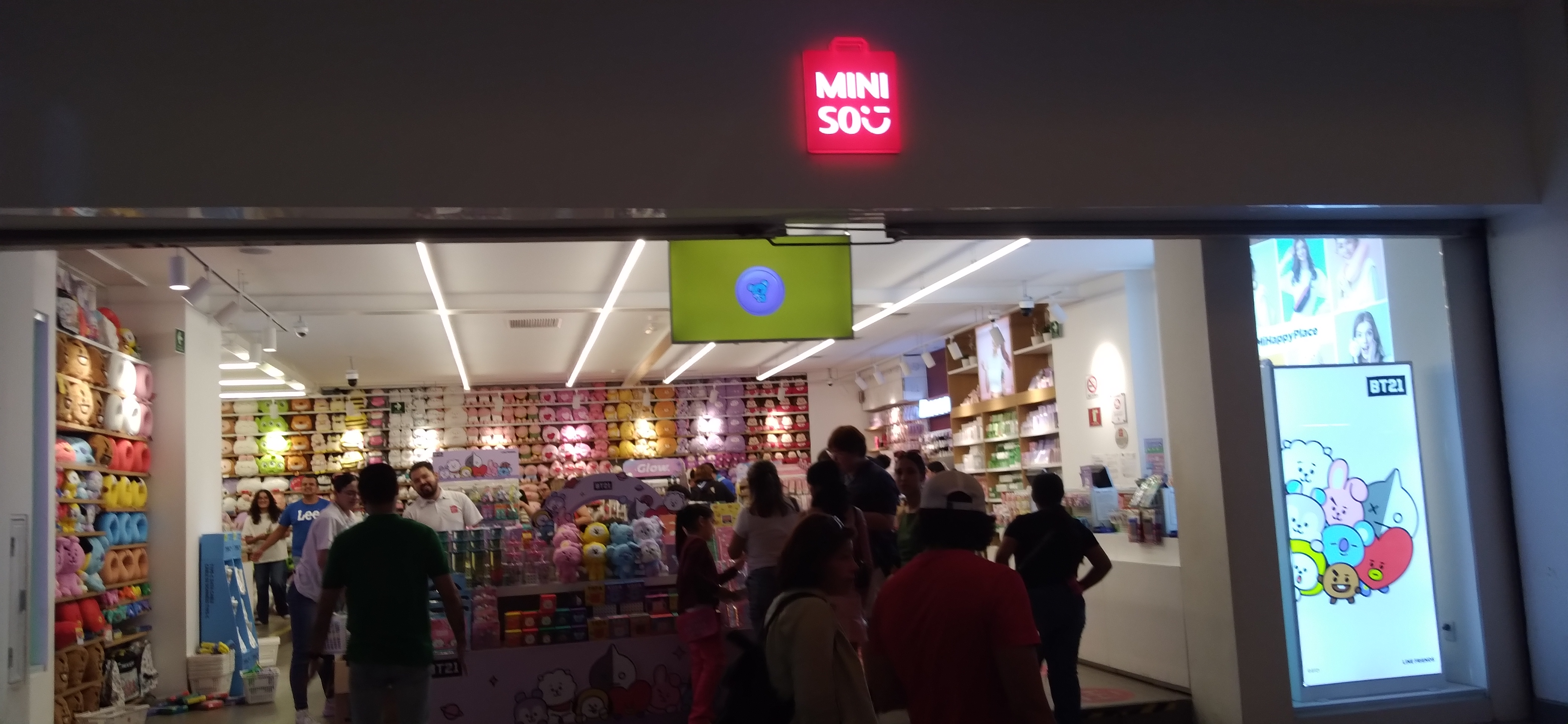
A MINISO retail store in Mazatlán, Mexico

In South America, MINISO opened its first retail store in Brazil in August 2017. Its second store followed in Chile in December 2017, where there are now 30 locations. In May 2018, MINISO opened its first retail store in Peru at Jockey Plaza Shopping Center. In Colombia, operations began with the simultaneous opening of two stores on August 30 in Bogotá, and by December 2018, they planned to have 15 stores in the country. In October 2018, MINISO opened its first store in Bolivia and reached its tenth store in that country by 2020.

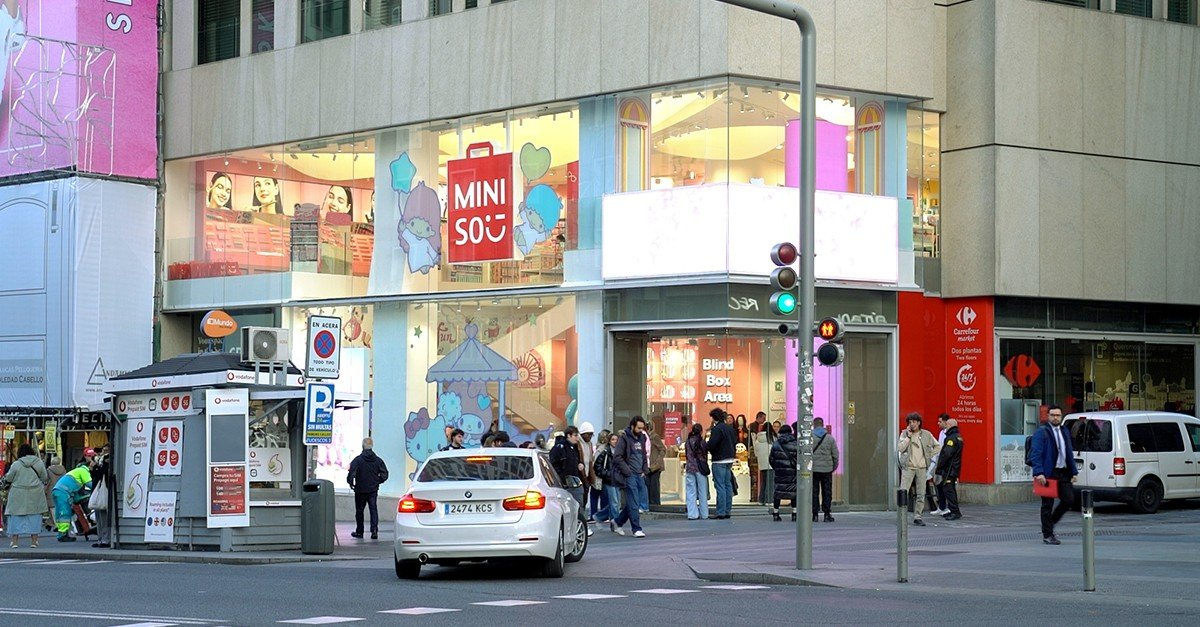
Miniso Spain's flagship store on Gran Via Boulevard in Madrid

In Europe, MINISO operates retail outlets in Spain, Germany, Italy, Poland, Estonia, Latvia, Bulgaria, Serbia, Armenia, Russia, the United Kingdom, France and Iceland.

In Africa, MINISO first entered Morocco in early 2017 with 15 stores in multiple cities around the kingdom, South Africa in August 2017 and Nigeria in West Africa one month later. There are also stores in Kenya and in Kampala, Uganda. As of January 2018, MINISO operated two stores in Egypt.

On August 1, 2018, MINISO opened its first store in Kuwait in the Avenues Mall Phase 4 (The Forum). On September 25, 2019, its second store was opened in The Avenues Mall Phase 1. On March 3, 2021, another store was opened in Marina Mall, and a fourth location opened on July 7, 2022, in Souq Sharq Mall.

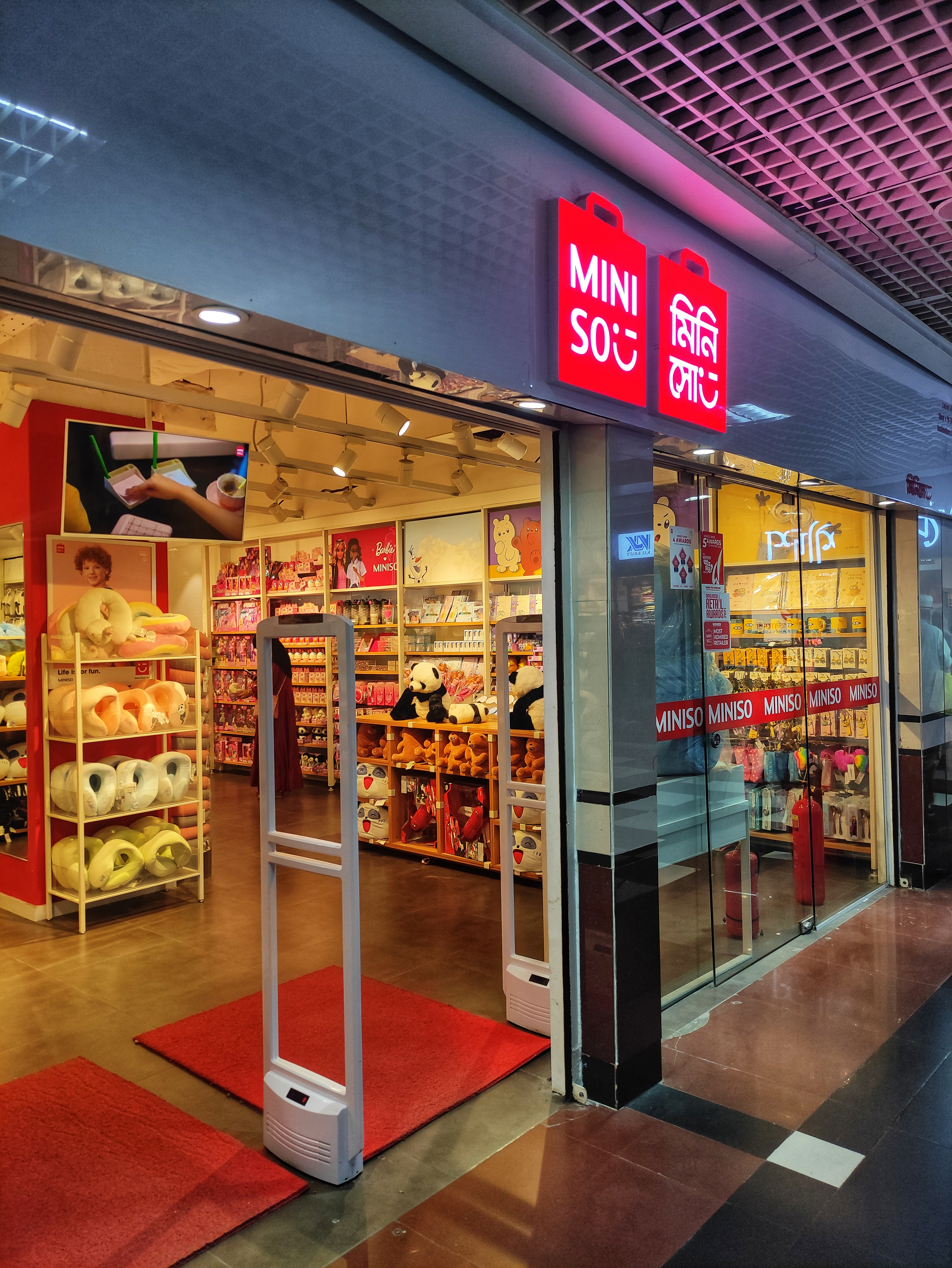
Miniso outlet at Bashundhara City shopping mall, Dhaka, Bangladesh

On September 1, 2018, MINISO opened two stores in Romania and plans to open 40 more stores nationwide. MINISO has opened more than 70 franchises in Pakistan during past three years. On January 12, 2018, MINISO opened its first store in Bangladesh, with 29 stores currently. In October 2018, MINISO opened its first store in New Zealand, at its peak around 8 stores operated around the country. All operations were liquidated in January 2026.

In June 2019, MINISO announced it would open six more stores in Israel bringing the total to 18 by the end of the year.

On 8 November 2019, MINISO opened its first store in the United Kingdom in Ealing, a West London suburb. They then proceeded to open more stores as of December 2023; including one in Wandsworth, South London and their Central London flagship store in Oxford Street on 10 November 2023, as well as a 'MINI MINISO' concept store near Chinatown, London on 29 September 2023. In February 2024, its largest UK store opened in Camden, London.

As of January 2020, MINISO had over 3,500 stores in 79 countries, with an approximate revenue of US$2.4 billion in 2019.

In January 2021, MINISO opened its first Portuguese store in Porto, Portugal, and announced plans to open 250 stores in Spain and Portugal. As of August 2021, MINISO had four stores in Oman, with three located in the capital city of Muscat and one store in Sohar.

In May 2023, MINISO opened its first flagship store in Times Square, New York City and one store inside the Mattel headquarters in El Segundo, California before its first live action movie (Barbie) was launched, specialized to sell Barbie-themed collaboration products. In December of the same year, its 100th U.S. store opened in Orlando, Florida. One year later, MINISO opened a pop-up store in Times Square, setting a new U.S. record for sales per square foot and ranking in the top three U.S. stores in terms of sales performance. On July 21, 2023, MINISO launches its Barbie-themed products on its flagship store and the Chinese Mattel's office, both in Changsha, to celebrate the releases of the live action movie of Barbie. More than 100 variants of Miniso-Barbie collaboration products were launched. On October 24, 2023, MINISO opened its first flagship store in Latin America at Costanera Center in Santiago, Chile.

In December 2023, MINISO opened its first Sanrio co-branded pop-up store, located in Margo City, a shopping mall in Depok, Indonesia. On March 30, 2024, MINISO opening its largest Barbie-themed store in Berjaya Times Square, Malaysia, partnered with Mattel. On 31 August 2024, the company opened its largest store globally at Central Park Jakarta, Indonesia.

In May 2024, MINISO expanded its presence in the New York metropolitan area with the opening of its first IP collection store in New Jersey. By the end of 2024, MINISO opened its 200th store in the United States. In June 2024, MINISO opened a flagship store on the Champs-Élysées in Paris, positioning the store as a global IP co-branded collection hub, launching more than 2,400 IP co-branded products, including Disney, Sanrio, BT21, Barbie, Harry Potter, Plants vs. Zombies, Minions, Pokémon and Peanuts. At the end of 2024, MINISO launched a flagship project, "MINISO LAND," in Madrid, Spain, aiming to enhance brand experience through themed spaces.

In January 2025, MINISO opened a flagship store at Asiatique The Riverfront in Thailand, further expanding its presence in Southeast Asia. Throughout 2023 and 2024, MINISO continued opening "IP-powered flagship stores" in key international markets, including Times Square in New York, Oxford Street in London, and the Champs-Élysées in Paris, showcasing collaborations with global IP brands and enhancing its international brand image. Also in June 2024, MINISO introduced its biggest flagship store at Plaza Hollywood in Hong Kong, making it the brand's largest store in the region.

== Intellectual property concerns ==
=== Copycat controversy ===
Since its opening, MINISO has focused on "Japanese style." Its logo, store image, and products are similar to those of Uniqlo, Muji, Daiso and even caused controversy over plagiarism due to being too similar. Their business methods are also known as "cottage-style" business methods. This is part of a trend that includes other chinese companies such as MUMUSO, Ximiso, and other Chinese brands designed to evoke South Korean and Japanese trends.

Laura Wen-Yu Young, a managing partner at San Francisco-based law firm Wang and Wang believes that there are no restrictions on creating a brand that simply sounds Japanese or Korean. She ultimately thinks that it will be up to the customers to decide whether such businesses "will succeed or fail based on normal market principle".

Simon Collins, founder of Fashion Culture Design Unconference and former Dean of Parsons School of Design, suggests that the criticism MINISO has been facing does not stand to a certain extent. He does not think that "Muji or Uniqlo represent Japanese cultural brand", given that they are "100% international".

MINISO allegedly started to remove Japanese elements from its stores and shopping bags in late 2019 across its 3,100 shops in China. MINISO's "de-Japanisation" process has allegedly been completed in March 2023.

=== Copyright infringement ===
Several products of MINISO were also accused of infringing copyrights rather than authorizing the use of characters designed by different cartoonists and illustrators. In mainland China, MINISO and its trademark owner Saiman Investment have been involved in many intellectual property infringement lawsuits, most of which ended with MINISO compensation.

The commodity director of MINISO said that their products "are similar to other famous brands because they are the original factory of the favorite brand products, so the similar appearance is reasonable."

== Finances ==
According to reports, the address, chairman, founder, and investment fund of Fenlibao, a P2P online lending platform, are all the same, and there are reports that the platform was established to support MINISO. However, after the Fenlibao platform collected funds from individual investors, MINISO guaranteed it, and then loaned to MINISO's franchisees at an annual interest rate as high as 18%, and the franchisees were asked to pay MINISO Chuangyoupin, this financing method has been questioned to transfer operating risks to franchisees to conduct "self-financing" (self-financing) behaviors that violate mainland Chinese laws and regulations, and is also suspected of violating regulations that prohibit providing "self-guarantees" to lenders. Its individual financing amount is also suspected of exceeding the upper limit. However, MINISO replied that its "industry-finance integration model" is not self-financing, and believes that doubters do not understand the operating nature of its P2P financing.

At the same time, according to the official announcement, the main assets of Fenlibao, an online loan investment docking platform, come from MINISO, and investors can get an annual interest rate of 6-11%, which is relatively "stable." This financing method allows MINISO to "transfuse blood" for franchisees and circulate assets internally to realize its business empire. Miniso stopped using the platform prior to its public listing. In August 2020, Fenlibao officially announced its closure, and other P2P businesses associated with Ye Guofu and Miniso (also known as Mingchuang Premium) were also wound down.

== Marketing ==
According to company co-founder Ye Guofu, the brand was initially registered in Japan and operates some stores there, contributing to its positioning as a "Japanese brand." However, this identity has been widely questioned, particularly due to its corporate headquarters and main operations being based in China.

In response to accusations of imitation, MINISO's Hong Kong general manager stated that the similarities with other Japanese-inspired brands were the result of employing a design team with diverse nationalities and a shared minimalist style. Critics have debated whether MINISO's branding is misleading or simply a strategic decision aligned with consumer preferences.

Legal experts interviewed by the South China Morning Post have argued that creating a brand name that sounds Japanese or Korean is not legally prohibited. Laura Wen-Yu Young, a managing partner at the U.S.-based law firm Wang & Wang, noted that market success is ultimately determined by consumer response rather than brand origin. Likewise, Simon Collins, founder of the Fashion Culture Design Unconference and former dean of Parsons School of Design, remarked that criticism toward MINISO may be overstated, emphasizing that even well-known Japanese-origin brands like Muji and Uniqlo are, in essence, globalized companies.

Nevertheless, because of MINISO's success in expanding its number of retail stores, AllianceBernstein, a global asset management company.

IP collaborations, word-of-mouth, celebrity endorsements and the ability to launch viral products are the basis of MINISO's success in China. Apart from collaborating with international brands, its store designs that attract customers and encourage social media engagement, it also uses blind boxes to increase sales, especially among young consumers.

In recent years, MINISO has expanded its overseas marketing activities by introducing IP-themed stores and pop-up events in various regions such as Southeast Asia, Australia, and the United States. These stores feature collaborations with globally recognized brands such as Harry Potter, Sanrio and Lilo & Stitch.

Additionally, MINISO has leveraged the global popularity of the blind box trend through initiatives like the "Blind Box Carnival," offering immersive unboxing experiences in stores worldwide. In 2023, MINISO reported global blind box sales exceeding 20 million units, further enhancing its brand engagement, particularly among younger demographics.

== Social responsibility ==
In February 2022, MINISO entered into partnership with Peruvian NGO ECOAN to plant a tree in the Andes mountains for each certain number of items it sold. The project was joined by entities from 37 countries and donated 115,000 plants. On June 22, 2022, MINISO launched a charity campaign - Penpen2PENPEN focused on supporting children around the world. MINISO alongside its customers and fans donated goods to children in 18 different countries. In September 2022, MINISO and the China Green Foundation jointly launched the #PlantForPanda# campaign to raise awareness for panda conservation and bamboo planting. The campaign resulted in planting over 50,000 clumps of bamboo for pandas. MINISO's 2023 ESG Report indicated that it supports women through its marriage and childbirth incentive programs and has established a fund of US$1.38 million. The proportion of women in senior management positions in China is 61.8%.

== Awards ==
In 2018 and 2019, MINISO won German iF Design Award for seven of its products including The Wave Pencil Box, "Water Cube" series water bottles, Kendama Gel Pen and portable lint rollers. In 2021, MINISO was awarded the Red Dot award for the simple and user-centric designs of the Ten Thousand Bristles Toothbrush and the double-sided makeup mirror. MINISO was named 2023 'International Retailer of the Year' and was awarded the 2023 and 2024 'Store Design of the Year' (Small) by Retail Asia Awards.

In 2024, MINISO won the gold award of 'Best Cause-Related Event' and bronze for 'Best Experiential Marketing' in Event Marketing Awards. MINISO won the "2024 Best Managed Companies" award by Deloitte China and received the title of "Most Intellectual Property Rights Merchandise" in The Malaysia Book of Records, in featuring 4,616 new products of 86 IPs. According to 2023 ESG report, MINISO is turning ""Waste" into Treasure by Using Recycled PET Bottles to Make Plush Toys". In 2024, MINISO won MUSE Design Awards for "the largest store in Indonesia", MUSE Design Awards for 200th store in the U.S. and MUSE Design Awards for its India store.

In addition to design awards, MINISO has been recognized for its corporate performance and leadership. In 2024, Ye Guofu, founder and CEO of MINISO, was named among Forbes China Best CEOs. The company was also honored by Institutional Investor as part of the 2024 Asia (Ex-Japan) Executive Team rankings.

Moreover, MINISO was listed among Forbes China's Top 30 Multinational Companies, and was ranked in the Hurun China 500 Most Valuable Private Companies 2023. In the same year, MINISO was awarded Forbes China's Best Employer 2024 — Most Popular Employer Among Employees.

== Gallery ==
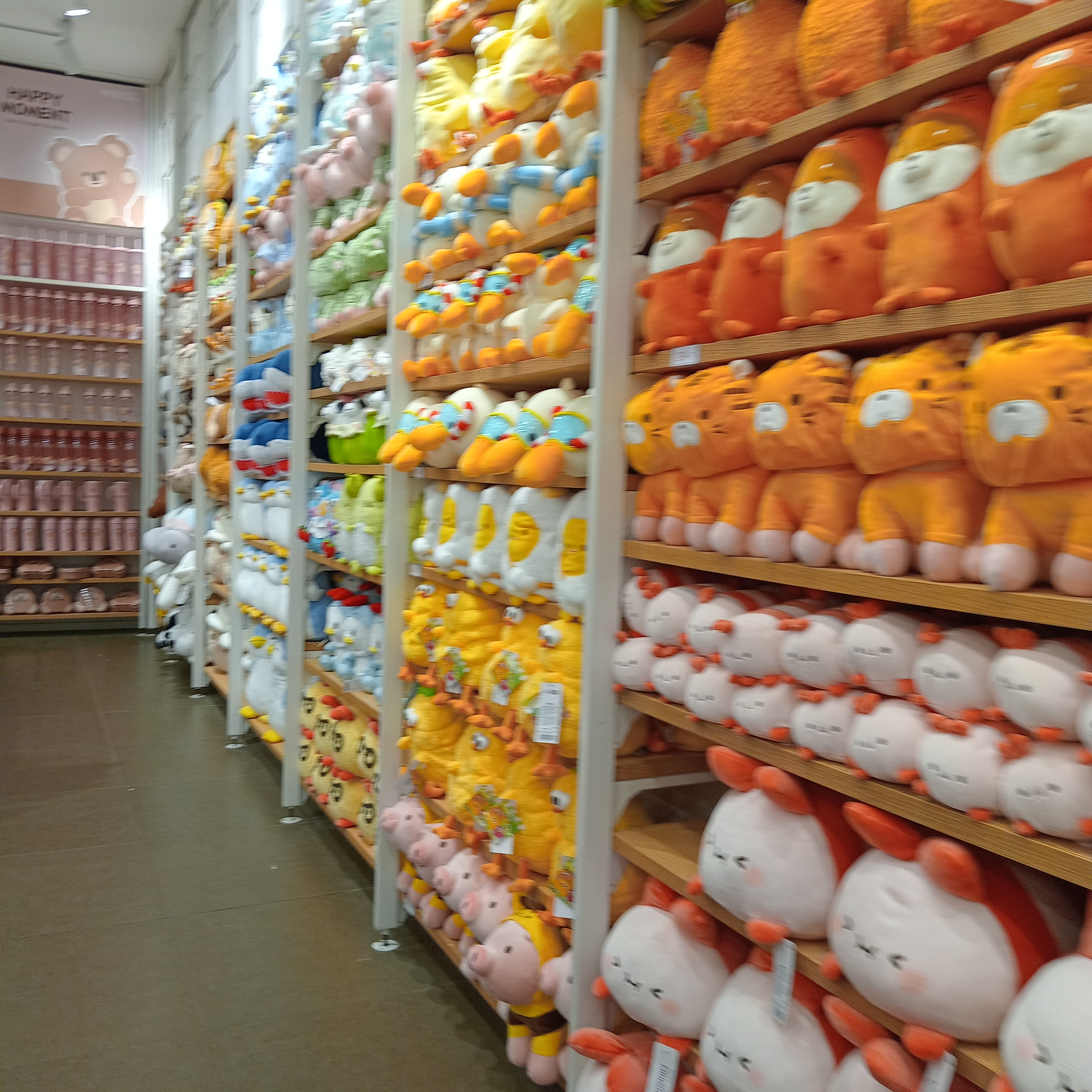
MINISO, SM Ormoc

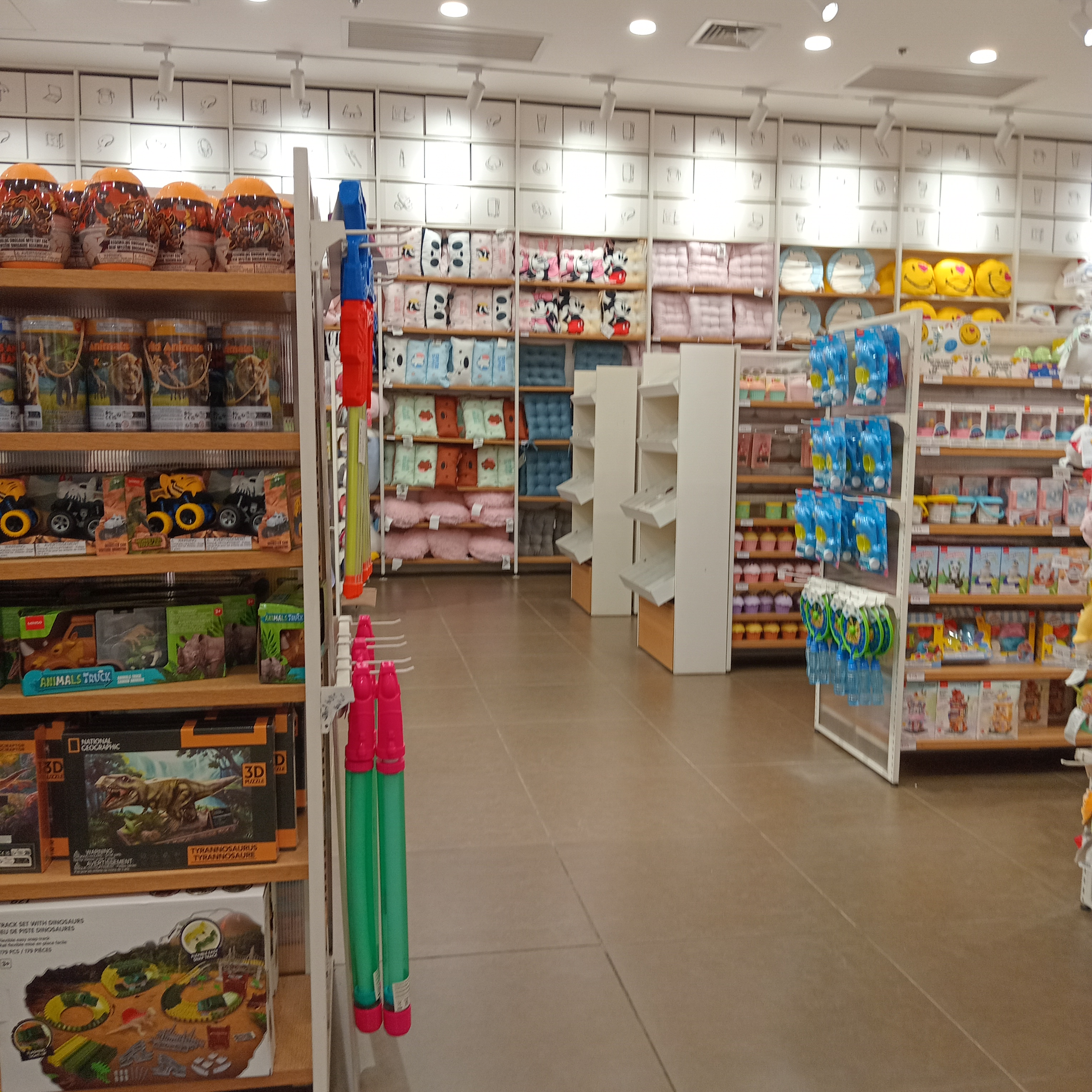
Shelves in MINISO, SM Ormoc

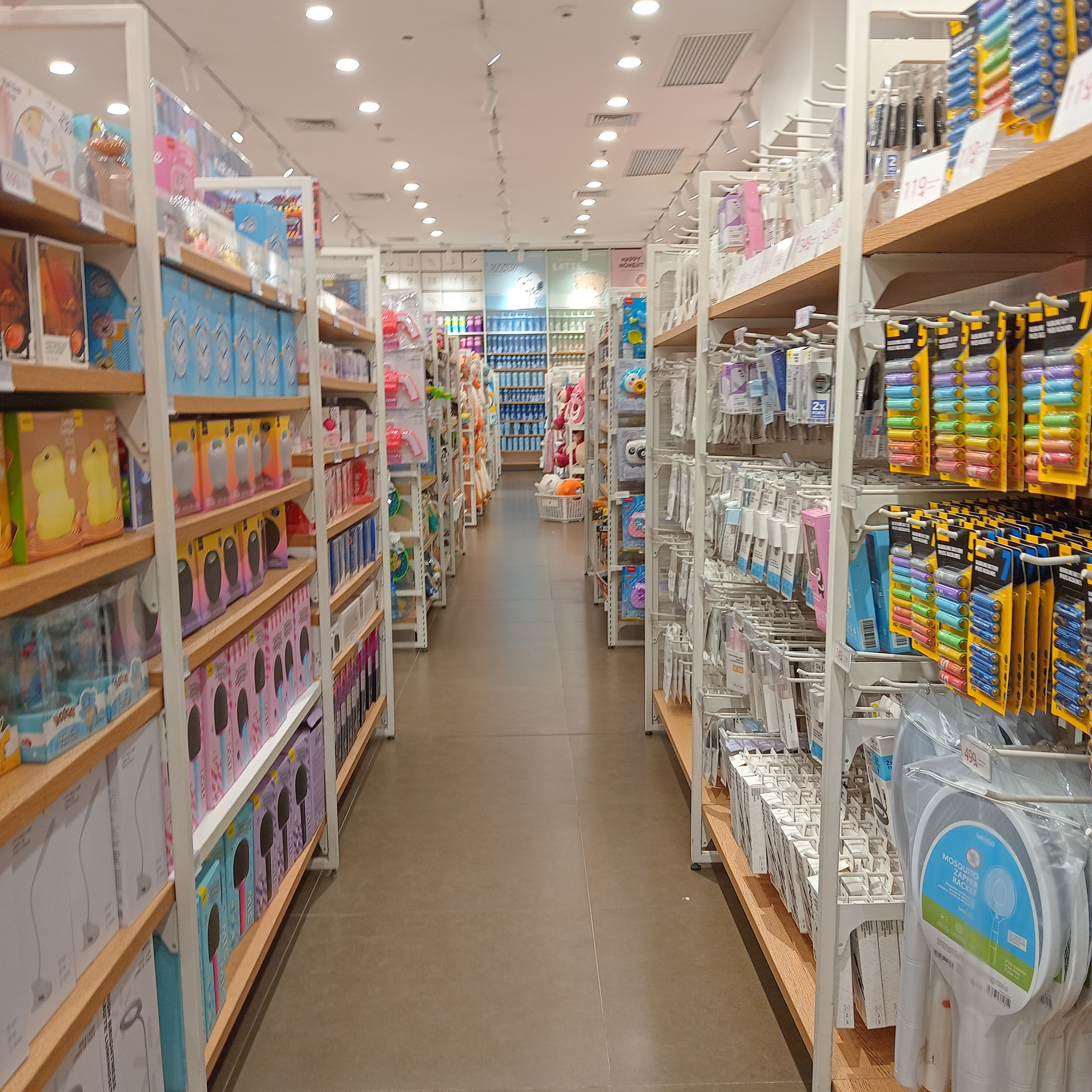
MINISO, SM Ormoc

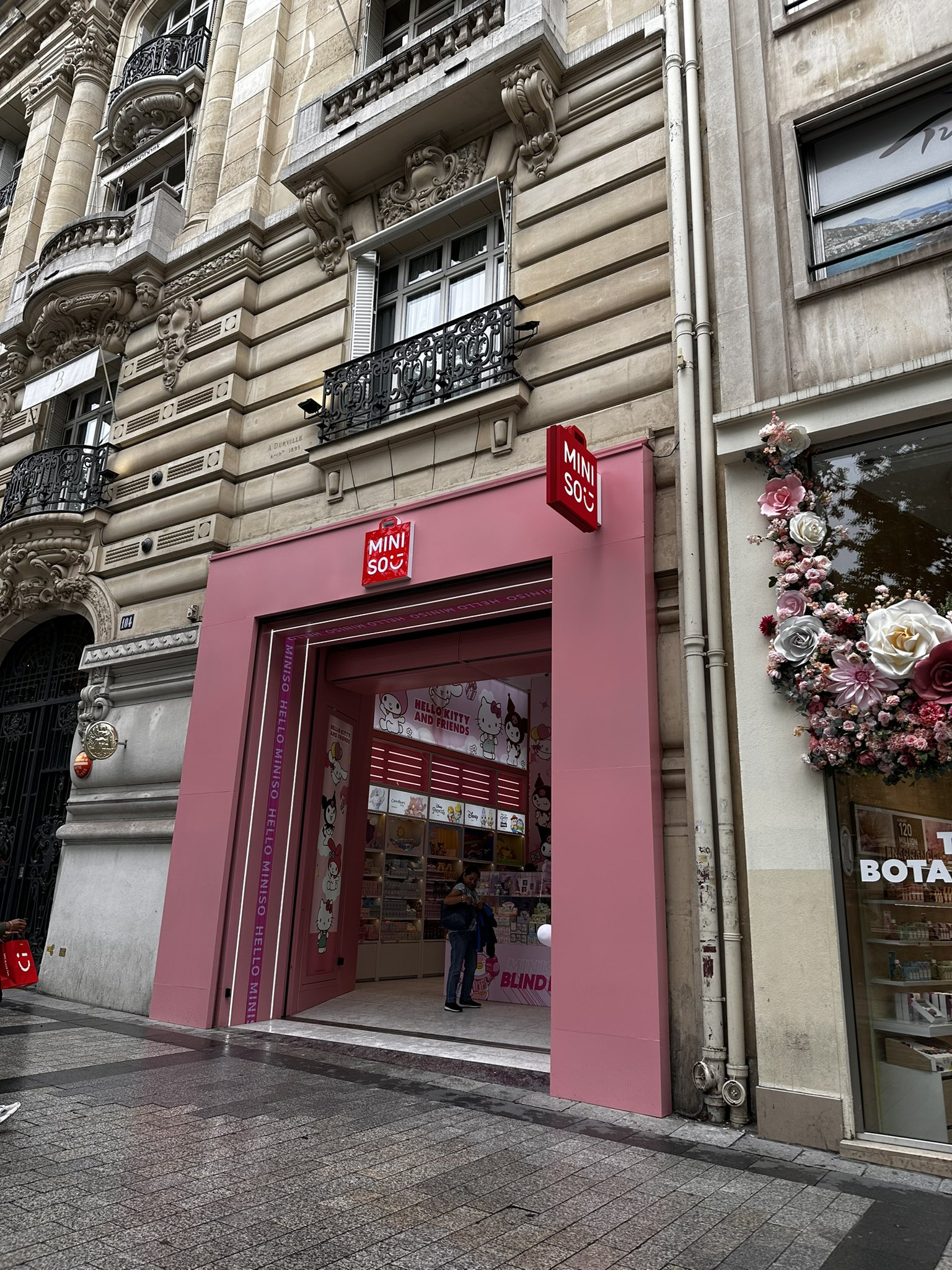
MINISO, Champs-Élysées

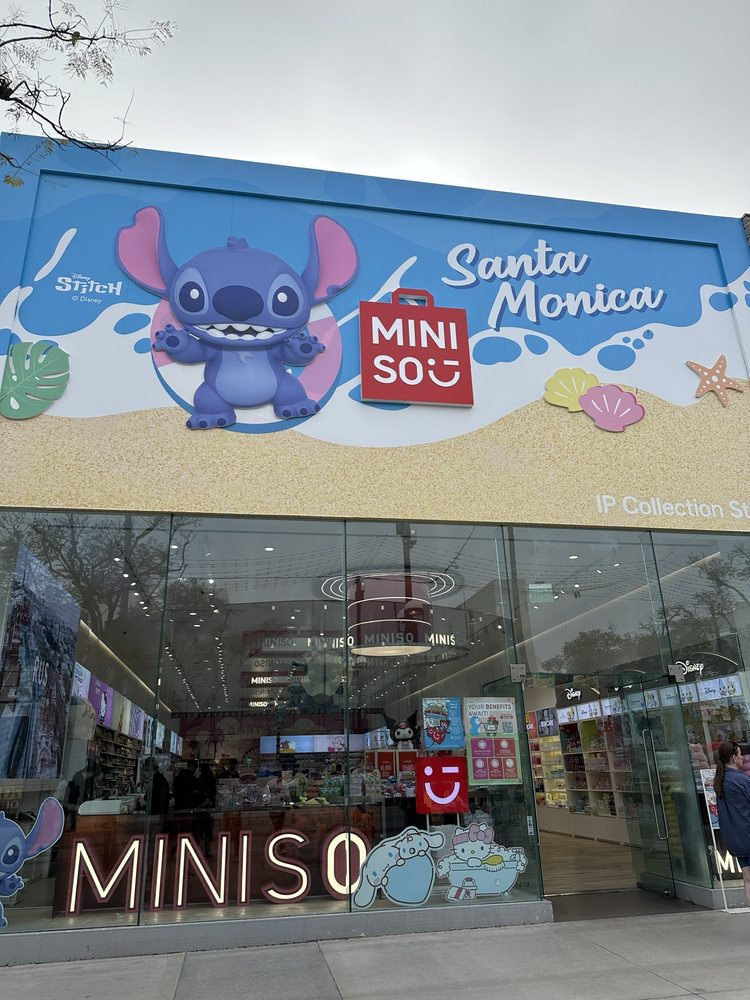
MINISO, Santa Monica

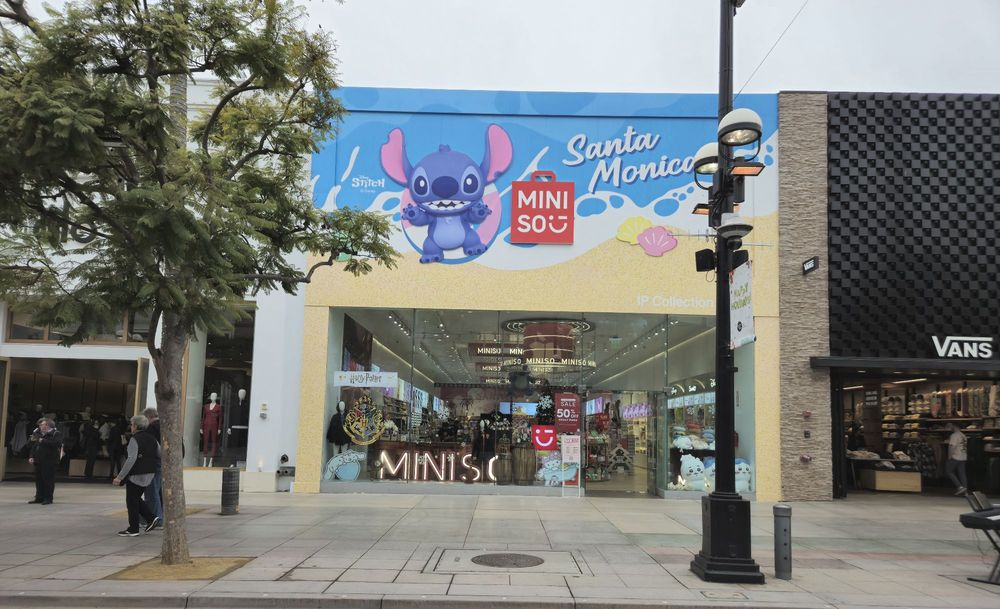
MINISO, Santa Monica

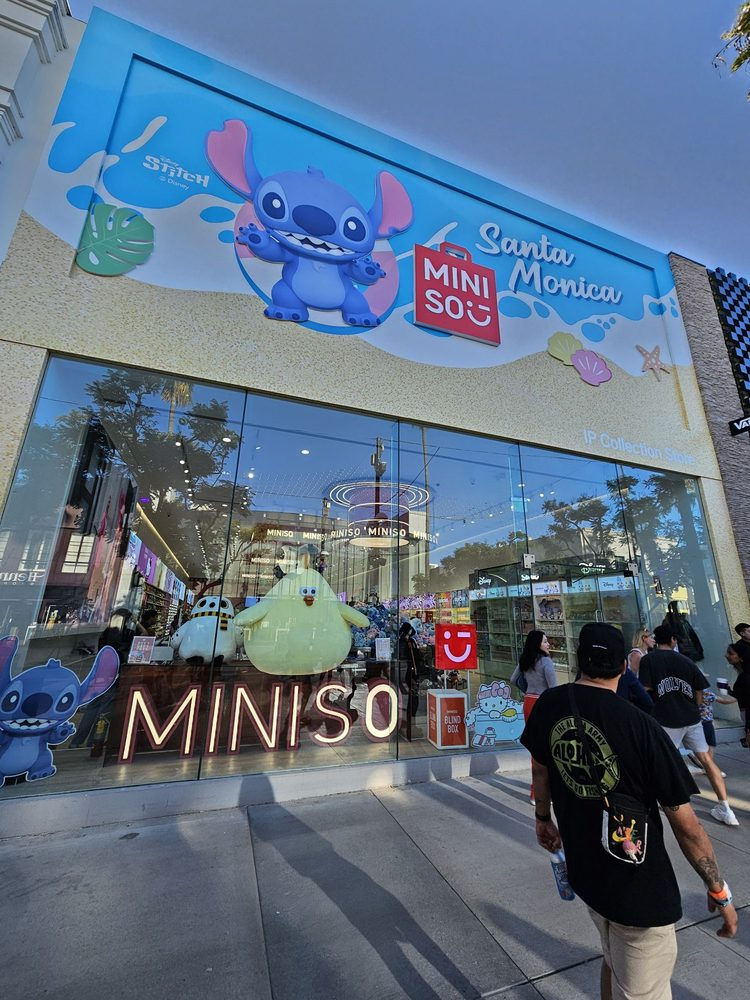
MINISO, Santa Monica

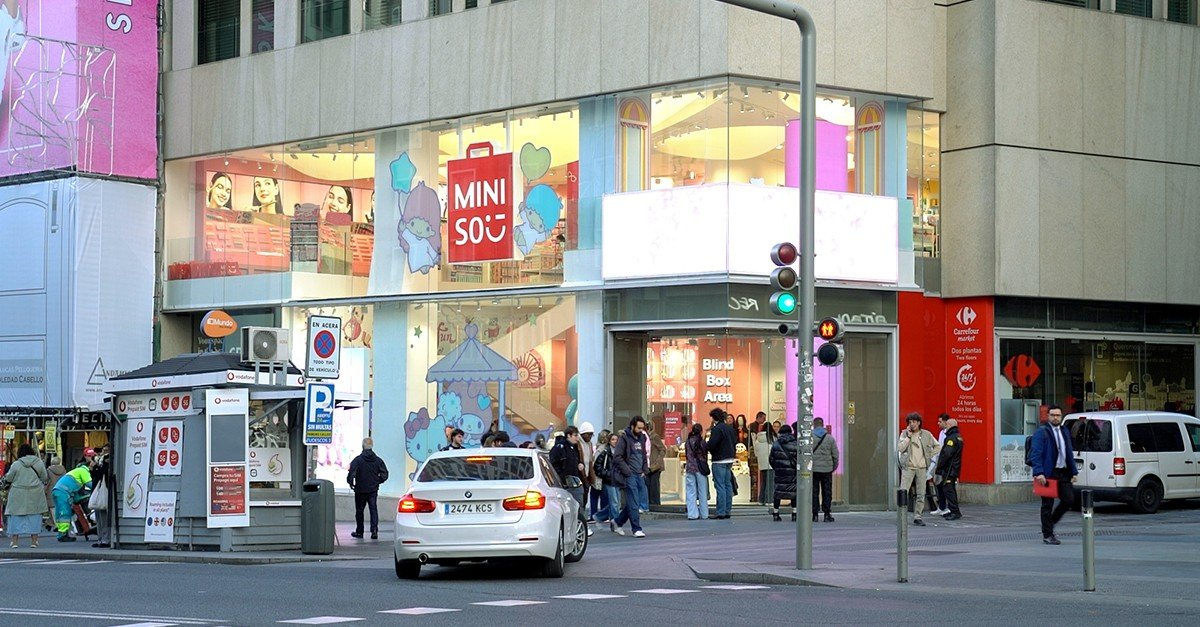
MINISO, Gran Via

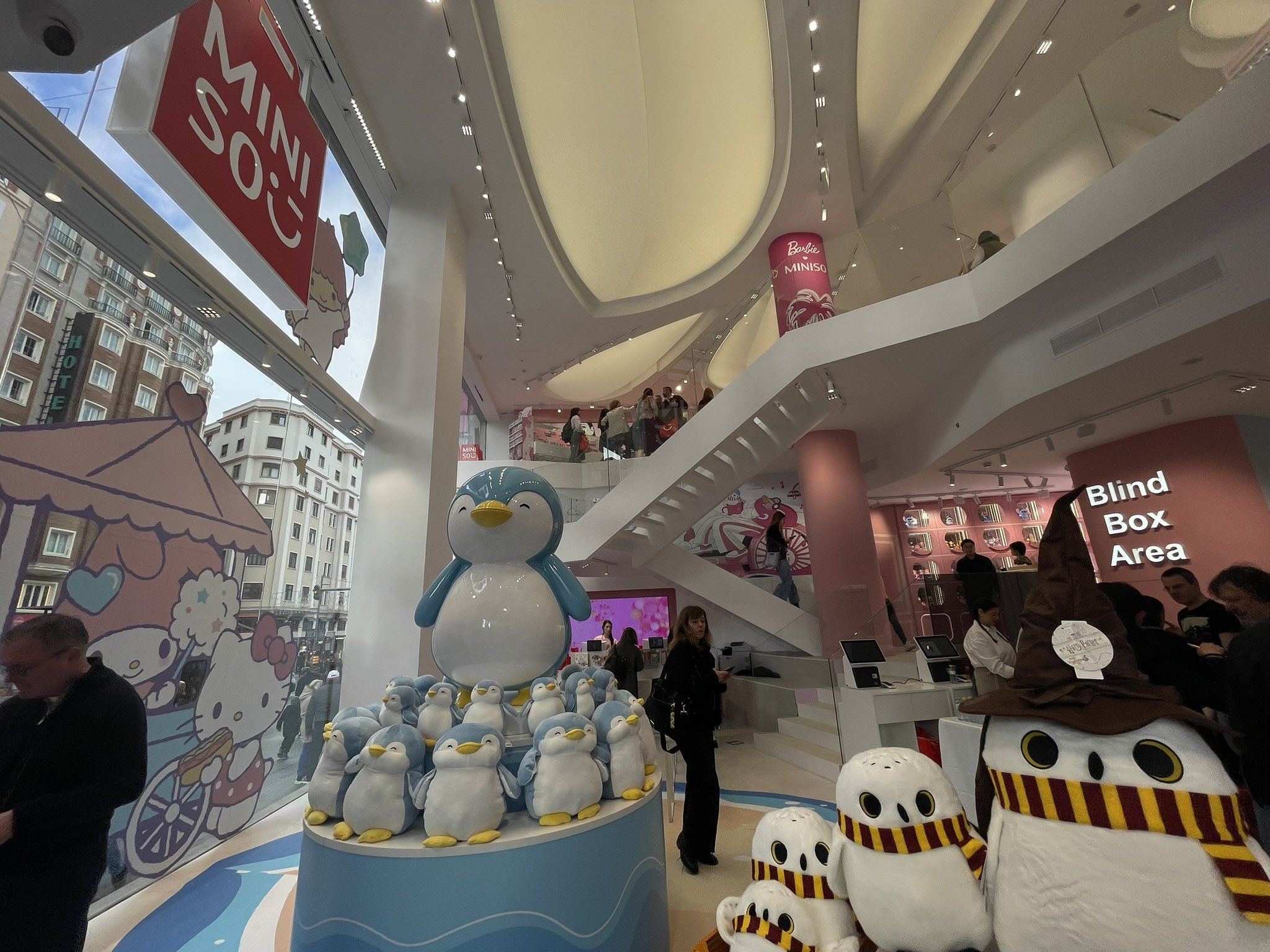
MINISO, Gran Via

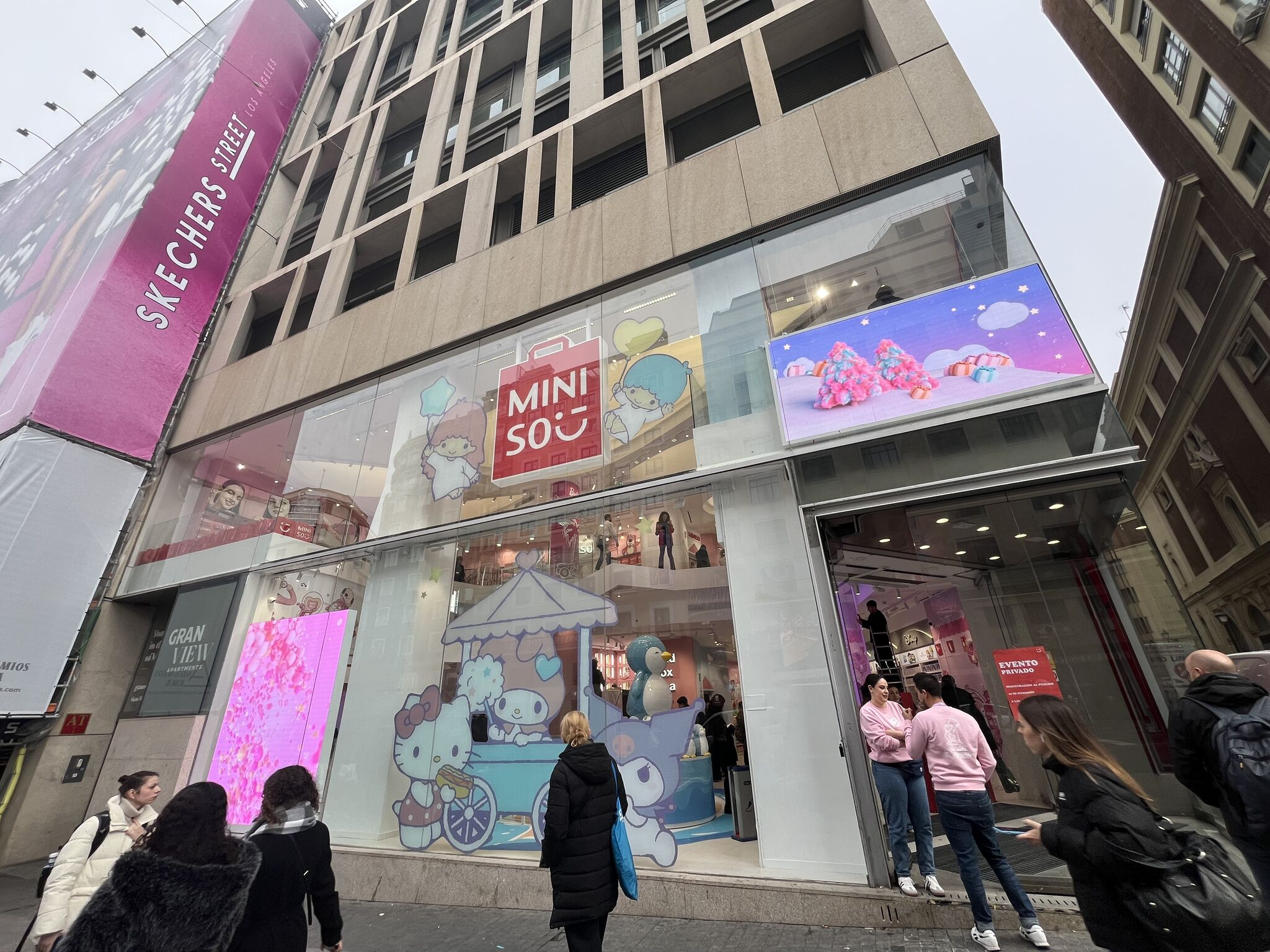
MINISO, Gran Via

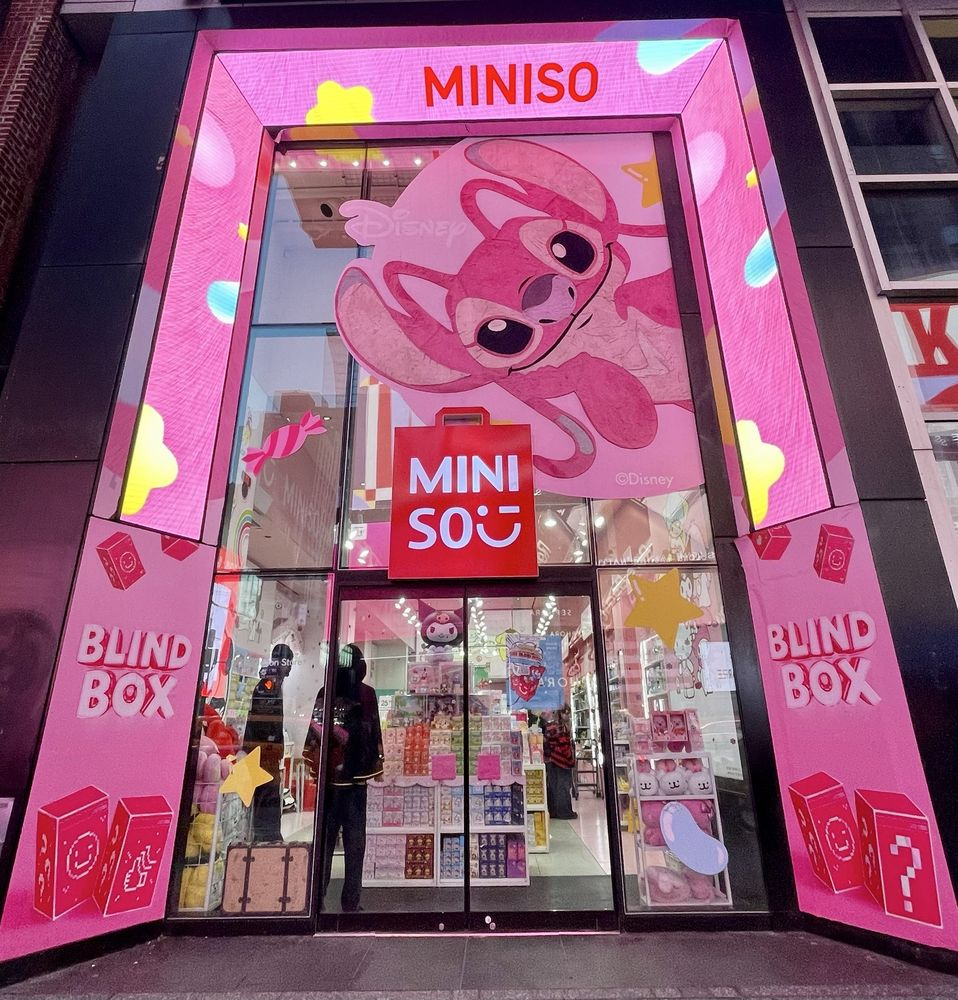
MINISO, Times Square

MINISO, Bristol
