= Juliette Brindak =

American businesswoman

Juliette Brindak Blake
- Born: Juliette Rosalie Brindak; 1989 (age 36–37); New York, New York, USA
- Education: Greenwich High School; Washington University
- Occupations: Co-Founder & CEO of Miss O and Friends, LLC

Juliette Brindak Blake is an American businesswoman and co-founder and Chief Executive Officer of the all-girl tween and teen social networking site, Miss O & Friends.

== Early life ==
Juliette Brindak was born in New York City, and was raised in Greenwich, Connecticut by Paul and Hermine Brindak. She is one of two children.

== Life and career ==
=== Miss O & Friends ===
Brindak runs Miss O & Friends, which she began as a hobby since 2005 when she was 16 years old. The company was inspired by drawings which Brindak did when she was ten. Miss O and Friends is a socialization site for tween and young teen girls. The content is created by the user community. In 2011, Miss O and Friends received 3 million monthly visitors and was ranked the third most-visited girls-only website, according to Alexa data. The site complies with the Children's Online Privacy Protection Act (COPPA).

As of 2012, the website's value was $15 million, according to Procter & Gamble which was an early investor. The company is based in Old Greenwich, Connecticut and has employees across the United States and Canada. Inc. Magazine named Miss O and Friend “Coolest College Start Ups.

In 2012, Brindak was a speaker at TEDx Bay Area. The same year, she launched Moms with Girls.

In 2017, she became an executive producer of a Youtube Premium original television series, Hyperlinked, based on her story (which includes a namesake character based on her).

In 2024, Miss O and Friends was changed to be a page advertising a new project called Moxies.

== Bibliography ==
Miss O & Friends: Write On! The Miss O & Friends Collection of Rockin' Fiction, Watson-Guptill, 2006, a compilation of stories submitted by users of the site.

== Personal life ==
On August 6, 2016 she married Christian Joseph Blake of Greenwich, Connecticut.

Brindak received her BA in anthropology and public health at Washington University in St. Louis.
