= Cultural depictions of Sally Hemings =

Sally Hemings has been represented in the media in popular culture due to her relationship with American Founding Father and president Thomas Jefferson. She has been portrayed in films and the inspiration for novels, plays and music.

== Literature ==
- 1853, William Wells Brown, known as the first African-American novelist, published his Clotel; or, The President's Daughter, a novel about a mixed-race daughter and based on the Jefferson-Hemings story.
- 1974, Fawn McKay Brodie published her psychobiography, Thomas Jefferson: An Intimate History, which seriously examined the evidence of Jefferson's relationship with Sally Hemings and was a bestseller. Together with articles about the issue and Jefferson-Hemings descendants in American Heritage magazine in 1974 and 1976, popular attention was attracted to the controversy, as her conclusion was vigorously resisted by mainline historians.
- 1979, Barbara Chase-Riboud's novel Sally Hemings became a bestseller. Hers was the first novel in which an author had portrayed Sally Hemings as a fully realized person. CBS began to adapt the popular novel as a miniseries, but prominent historians Virginius Dabney (a descendant of Jefferson's sister Martha) and Dumas Malone successfully campaigned against it with the network's president William S. Paley, and persuaded him to kill the project.
- 1993, Steve Erickson's novel Arc d'X features Sally Hemings as one of the main characters.
- 2016 Sally Hemings is a main character in the historical novel America's First Daughter by Stephanie Dray and Laura Kamoie. The novel draws heavily upon Jefferson's letters and includes his relationship with Hemmings starting in Paris.
- 2016, Stephen O'Connell's Thomas Jefferson Dreams of Sally Hemings depicts the relationship between Hemings and Jefferson.

== In television ==
- 1976, the opening episode of the third season of the TV series, The Jeffersons, was entitled "George and the President," and had a plot linked to the Jefferson–Hemings controversy.
- 1986, In an episode of Head of the Class, Darlene Merrimen (played by actress Robin Givens) learns that she is a descendant of Sally Hemings.
- 2000, Sally Hemings: An American Scandal, was a CBS television miniseries (air dates: February 13, 2000 and February 16, 2000; writer: Tina Andrews director: Charles Haid; with Carmen Ejogo as Hemings and Sam Neill as Thomas Jefferson). As PBS noted in a Frontline program, "Though many quarrelled with the portrayal of Hemings as unrealistically modern and heroic, no major historian challenged the series' premise that Hemings and Jefferson had a 38-year relationship that produced children."
- 2000, PBS Frontline had an extensive documentary program entitled Jefferson's Blood, about the issues of DNA, historical evidence related to Jefferson's likely paternity of Hemings' children, and the significance of the controversy and its issues in American history. Documentary material is on the website for this program.
- 2002, Saturday Night Live parodied the relationship of Hemings and Jefferson in a skit titled Thomas Jefferson Meets Sally Hemings in Season 28, Episode 8. Hemings was portrayed by Maya Rudolph and Jefferson by Robert De Niro.
- 2008, HBO's miniseries John Adams briefly shows Sally Hemings in its final episode, "Peacefield (1803 A.D. – 1826 A.D.)". Hemings, played by actress Lizan Mitchell, is shown comforting Jefferson, played by Stephen Dillane, as he dies at Monticello; and crying openly once he has died.
- 2013, Sleepy Hollow, a television series on Fox, the episode "Midnight Ride" references an affair between Thomas Jefferson and Sally Hemings, citing DNA evidence as proof to the lead character, Ichabod Crane, who knew Jefferson.
- 2025, Hemings is portrayed and discussed in the six-episode miniseries, Thomas Jefferson.

== In film ==
- 1995, The second half of the film Jefferson in Paris portrayed the early relationship between Sally Hemings (played by Thandiwe Newton) and Jefferson (Nick Nolte).

== In opera ==
- 2001: From the Diary of Sally Hemings, with a text by playwright and librettist Sandra Seaton, is a solo opera by the American composer William Bolcom; it was premiered at the Library of Congress. The Jefferson-Hemings descendants attended the premiere.
- 2005, Jefferson & Poe: A Lyric Opera portrays a dual love story, one between Jefferson and Hemings, and the other between Edgar Allan Poe and Jefferson's daughter.
- 2012, Tom and Sally in Paris is a two-act opera with libretto and music by William Lavonis; he explores Jefferson and Hemings' relationship during the French Revolution.
- 2016, Monticello Wakes is an opera with libretto by Tim Appelo and music by Garrett Fisher; it focuses on Sally Hemings, her lookalike sister Martha Jefferson, and Thomas Jefferson, and was produced at Loyola Marymount University Los Angeles and accompanied by Tori Ellison's bronze public sculpture "Self Evident (for Sally Hemings)," installed at City Hall, commissioned by the Mayor of Inglewood, California, who proclaimed the world's first Sally Hemings Day. The sculpture, a subject of Helen Lessick's paper "Growing Artists Public Projects" at the Dec. 3, 2025 inaugural World Public Art Conference at the United Nations, is near Frederick M. Roberts Park, named after Sally Hemings' descendant, who signed legislation to create UCLA as Thomas Jefferson had created the University of Virginia. In the premiere audience was LMU professor Rosalynde LeBlanc Loo, a descendant of Sally's sister Mary and LMU dance department chair and 2024 Peabody Award-winning producer/co-director of "Can You Bring It: Bill T. Jones and D-Man in the Waters."

== In theater ==
- 2003, Sally: A Solo Play, written by Sandra Seaton, directed by Langdon Brown and starring Zabryna Guevara premiered at the New York State Writer's Institute
- 2005, The musical "Sally and Tom (The American Way)" by Fred Newman and Annie Roboff, premiered off Broadway in New York City.
- 2010, the play "A Bed Made in Heaven", a historical play about the relationship between Sally Hemings and Thomas Jefferson, written by Sandra Seaton and directed by David Wolber, had its premier.
- 2015, In the musical Hamilton, Sally Hemings briefly appears and has a dance solo in "What'd I Miss", the opening to Act II.
- 2017, Thomas & Sally by Thomas Bradshaw depicted the relationship between Thomas Jefferson and Sally Hemings. This depiction was met with controversy over the question of consent.
- 2022, Suzan-Lori Parks's play Sally and Tom. involves a fictional playwright working on a play-within-a-play about Thomas Jefferson and Sally Hemings. Both the fictional playwright and Hemings in the play-in-a-play are played by the same actress.

== In music ==
- 2015: On the Hamilton cast album, Sally Hemings is mentioned very briefly on the track "What'd I Miss?".
- 2016: On The Hamilton Mixtape album, Sally Hemings is mentioned as a sly reference in the track "Cabinet Battle 3 (demo)."
- 2016: Composer and director Daniel Rowsey directs a 5-minute music video of a song in the style of the musical Hamilton entitled "They're Ready" described as "picking up where Hamilton left off" about a conversation between Jefferson and Hemings as whether it is wise to seek to ban the importation of slaves into the United States.

== In art ==
- American artist Titus Kaphar's 2014 piece Behind the Myth of Benevolence features a classical oil portrait of Thomas Jefferson, drawn back to reveal the painting of a naked slave woman beneath the canvas. Although the reference to Hemings is clear, by the artist's own admission the portrayal does not match her reported appearance (she was described as light-skinned with straight hair), instead presenting her with more African features to be a broader representation of enslaved women invisibilized by traditional American history.
- American artist Martin Puryear included a piece titled A Column for Sally Hemings in the 2019 Venice Bienniale.

== See also ==
- Cultural depictions of Thomas Jefferson
