= Alyson Cambridge =

American operatic soprano

- Born: Arlington, Virginia, United States
- Genres: Opera; classical music; jazz; American popular song
- Occupation: Operatic soprano
- Years active: 2003–present
- Website: alysoncambridge.com
- Education: Oberlin College and Conservatory; Curtis Institute of Music
- Awards: Metropolitan Opera National Council Auditions Grand Prize (2003); Licia Albanese-Puccini Foundation International Voice Competition First Prize (2003); George London Foundation Award (2004); Régine Crespin Award at the Elardo International Opera Competition (2008)

Alyson Cambridge is an American operatic soprano. In addition to opera, she sings classical song, jazz, American songbook and popular song.

In 2003 Cambridge won the Metropolitan Opera National Council Auditions, becoming the competition's youngest Grand Prize winner ever. She made her Metropolitan Opera debut the following year in Carmen. She was also awarded First Prize in the 2003 Licia Albanese-Puccini Foundation International Voice Competition, First Prize in the 2004 George London Foundation Award, and the Régine Crespin Award at the 2008 Elardo International Opera Competition.

In 2010, her debut recording, From the Diary of Sally Hemings, was released, and made its premier at Weill Recital Hall at Carnegie Hall. In 2016, Cambridge released her second solo album, with the jazz standards and American popular song-based Until Now. Her third album, Sisters in Song, with soprano Nicole Cabell and the Lake Forest Symphony, will be released in September 2018. She has served as brand ambassador for Swiss luxury watch and jewelry designer Chopard, as well as for fashion designers Vivianne Tam and Monika Chiang. In 2018, Cambridge is performing on Broadway, as one of the lead vocalists in Rocktopia, which fuses iconic 20th-century rock with classical masterpieces.

== Early and personal life ==
Cambridge was born and raised in Arlington, Virginia. Her father Richard, whose parents are from Guyana, immigrated to the United States for college at the age of 19 from Guyana on the Caribbean coast of South America, and is a principal economist at the World Bank. Her mother is from Minnesota, of Danish-Norwegian heritage, and works at the National Academy of Sciences. She grew up with diverse music being played in her home, as her mother played opera around the house, and was a big classical music (especially opera and symphonic music) fan, her father gravitated to Caribbean music, calypso, reggae, soca, disco, and jazz, and she loved Whitney Houston and Madonna.

Cambridge has gold-brown hair and green eyes. The Washington Post opined that her "25-inch waist and stunning features make her seem a natural for the catwalk, not for an opera house."

She started taking vocal lessons after a friend suggested that she do so, after hearing her jokingly pretend to sing opera. Cambridge's first voice lesson was at the Levine School of Music, at the age of 12, and she continued taking voice lessons at the school. She was a student at Sidwell Friends School in Washington, D.C. In high school, she was an athlete, played varsity soccer, participated in many popular extra-curricular activities, and she often hid the fact that she was studying classical singing, because she "didn't think it was cool."

Cambridge now lives in New York City, with her poodle-bichon named Lucy.

== University ==
Cambridge attended university at Oberlin College and Conservatory of Music, where she earned a double degree with honors in both—a B.M. in Voice Performance and a B.A. in sociology, with a concentration in pre-law. She decided in her senior year at Oberlin to pursue an operatic career full-time. She then continued her vocal studies at the Curtis Institute of Music in Philadelphia, studying for a master's degree in Opera for one year.

== Opera career ==
Cambridge began as a light lyric soprano, then developed into a full lyric soprano, and more recently begun to develop into a spinto soprano, a more powerful voice that can handle more dramatic climaxes.

In 2003 Cambridge won the Metropolitan Opera National Council Auditions, while still a student at The Curtis Institute of Music, becoming the competition's youngest Grand Prize winner ever. The Grand Prize gained her entrance into the Metropolitan Opera's Lindemann Young Artist Development Program, as well as $15,000 to further her education and career. That year she appeared in Washington for the first time as a professional, as Adina in L'elisir d'amore with the Wolf Trap Opera Company. The Washington Post wrote:

Cambridge ... was radiant, vocally assured, dramatically subtle and compelling and artistically imaginative. Even amid a stage full of singing and dancing, she could sit off to the side reading quietly and be the most interesting person there. She was able to imbue long, pregnant pauses in her lines with the same intensity that accompanied her coloratura passages and, even when the chorus was most out of sync with the orchestra ... she was absolutely on the beat.

In 2004 Cambridge made her Met debut as Frasquita in Georges Bizet's Carmen, and was noted by Anne Midgette of The New York Times for her "powerful, clear voice". She has since appeared in several roles with that company, including Giannetta in L'elisir d'amore, a Flower Maiden in Parsifal, Karolka in Jenůfa, Crobyle in Thaïs, and Bianca in La Rondine. She also played Giulietta in The Tales of Hoffmann with the Lyric Opera of Chicago, and Juliette in Romeo et Juliette at the Opera Theatre of Saint Louis. In the 2009–10 season she portrayed Musetta in La Bohème at the Portland Opera, Clara in Porgy and Bess at the Washington National Opera, and Donna Elvira in Don Giovanni with Opera Cleveland. In 2010-11 she debuted as Violetta with the Polish National Opera and as Donna Elvira with the Savonlinna Opera Festival.

In the 2011–12 season she debuted as Donna Elvira with Deutsche Oper Berlin, as Giulietta in The Tales of Hoffmann' and as Julie in Show Boat with Lyric Opera of Chicago, and as Mimi in La Bohème with the Hungarian National Opera. In 2013, she starred as Julie in the Washington National Opera production of Showboat. She has also performed with Boston Lyric Opera, Opera Cleveland, Atlanta Opera, Palm Beach Opera, and Lyric Opera of Kansas City.

In 2003 she was also awarded First Prize in the Licia Albanese-Puccini Foundation International Voice Competition. In 2004 she received the George London Foundation Award, and in 2008 she received the Régine Crespin Award at the Elardo International Opera Competition.

== Non-opera music career ==
In 2014 she performed on the "Soul Train Music Awards" on BET, in the "2014 Christmas Concert for the Troops" at the Kennedy Center, and before the United States Supreme Court in a recital sponsored by Justice Ruth Bader Ginsburg.

Her concert performances include Gustav Mahler's Symphony No. 4 with conductor Sir Simon Rattle and the Oberlin Chamber Orchestra; a program of songs and arias with the San Francisco Symphony, Joseph Canteloube's Chants d'Auvergne with the Chautauqua Symphony Orchestra and the Baton Rouge Symphony Orchestra; Johannes Brahms' A German Requiem and Bachianas Brasileiras No. 5 with the Roanoke Symphony Orchestra; Felix Mendelsohn's Elijah with the Baton Rouge Symphony Orchestra; Samuel Barber's Knoxville: Summer of 1915 with the Stamford Symphony; and the Porgy and Bess Suite with Peter Nero and the Detroit Symphony Orchestra and Omaha Symphony. She has also appeared in solo recitals and concerts in New York, Washington, D.C., Barbados, and Hawaii.

In March and April 2018, she is performing on Broadway, featured in Rocktopia, which fuses iconic 20th-century rock with world-renowned classical masterpieces, at the Broadway Theatre. Reviewer Sarah Downs wrote in New York Theatre Guide: "Cambridge ... possesses a stunning, richly hued voice that she has to stifle at times to match the performance level of the other singers," while theater critic Charles Isherwood wrote in Broadway News that her "vibrant soprano is lovely to hear — and, swathed in a rather complicated sexy-glam gown ... she also looks gorgeous."

== Recording career ==
In February 2010, her debut recording with pianist Lydia Brown, From the Diary of Sally Hemings (about the slave who was thought to be the mistress of Thomas Jefferson) was released on the White Pine Music label. The song cycle was composed by William Bolcom, with text by playwright Sandra Seaton.

In 2016, Cambridge released her second solo album with the jazz standards and American popular song-based Until Now.

In September 2018, her third album, Sisters in Song, with soprano Nicole Cabell and the Lake Forest Symphony, will be released by Cedille Records. It will be a combination of opera, art song and African-American spirituals.

== Outside of music ==
Cambridge is a brand ambassador for Swiss luxury watch and jewelry designer Chopard, as well as for fashion designer Monika Chiang.

She has modeled for Sculpsure, Monika Chiang, Chopard, The Today Show and other various fashion, lifestyle and fashion brands.

She has donated her time to charities, including The Fresh Air Fund, The Humane Society, K9s for Warriors, Sing For Hope, the American Red Cross, and Hope For Hearts Foundation.
