= Michael Frankenberger =

Austrian film composer and musician

Michael Frankenberger (born 3 January 1999) is an Austrian film composer and musician. His composing credits include the documentary series Kennedy, Stable – The Boxing Game and Mind over Matter. He has also contributed additional music and arrangements to productions including Gran Turismo, Life on Our Planet, His Dark Materials, Man vs. Bee and We Are Storror.

In 2020, Frankenberger was selected for the German-language edition of Forbes' 30 Under 30 list.

== Early life and education ==
Frankenberger was born on 3 January 1999 in Salzburg, Austria. He studied composition and music theory at Mozarteum University Salzburg. In 2018, Frankenberger completed an internship at Remote Control Productions, Hans Zimmer's film music company in Los Angeles, and later worked as a freelance composer for Zimmer's film and television music studios.

In 2019, he recorded his album In Silentio with the Film Orchestra Babelsberg and conducted the orchestral recording sessions.

== Career ==
One of Frankenberger's early film scores was the 2019 Holocaust documentary We Shall Not Die Now. He co-composed the score with director Ashton Gleckman, while Benjamin Wallfisch contributed the film's main theme. The film premiered at the Heartland International Film Festival in October 2019.

In 2023, Frankenberger co-composed the music for Kennedy, an eight-part documentary series about John F. Kennedy, with Ashton Gleckman and Cameron Moody. Produced in association with RadicalMedia, the series aired on the History Channel in November 2023 and was later released on Hulu.

Frankenberger composed the music for the four-part documentary series Stable – The Boxing Game, with the main theme composed by Lorne Balfe. Directed by Gavin Fitzgerald and produced by Lorton Entertainment, the series was acquired by the BBC. In 2026, he composed the music for Mind over Matter, a two-part documentary series about Austrian alpine skier Max Franz.

In addition to his work as a lead composer, Frankenberger has contributed additional music and arrangements to film and television productions. He has worked with composers including Lorne Balfe, Kevin Matley, Andrew Kawczynski, Shashwat Sachdev, Alfie Godfrey and Taran Mitchell. These credits include Gran Turismo, Life on Our Planet, His Dark Materials, Man vs. Bee and We Are Storror.

== Awards and nominations ==
- 2020: Forbes 30 Under 30 – German-language edition
- 2026: Hollywood Music in Media Awards – Nominated in the category Score – Documentary Series – TV/Digital for Mind over Matter.

== Selected filmography ==
=== As composer ===
- We Shall Not Die Now (2019) – documentary film; with Ashton Gleckman; main theme by Benjamin Wallfisch
- The Hills I Call Home (2021) – documentary film; with Ashton Gleckman
- Salzburg. Eine Kunstgeschichte (2021) – documentary film
- Bang on Time (2021) – documentary film
- Kennedy (2023) – eight-part documentary series; with Ashton Gleckman and Cameron Moody
- Wege der Kunst – Der Kunstsammler Reinhold Würth (2023) – documentary film
- Stable – The Boxing Game (2024) – four-part documentary series; main theme by Lorne Balfe
- Mind over Matter (2026) – two-part documentary series

=== Additional music and arrangements ===
- His Dark Materials (2022) – additional music
- Man vs. Bee (2022) – additional arrangements
- Gran Turismo (2023) – additional arrangements
- Life on Our Planet (2023) – additional music
- We Are Storror (2025) – additional music
- The War Between the Land and the Sea (2025) – additional music
- The Dinosaurs (2026) – additional music
