= Cultural critic =

Professional who reasonably judges the norms and behaviors of a society

A cultural critic is a critic of a given culture, usually as a whole. Cultural criticism has significant overlap with social and cultural theory. While such criticism is simply part of the self-consciousness of the culture, the social positions of the critics and the medium they use vary widely. The conceptual and political grounding of criticism also changes over time.

== Terminology ==
Contemporary usage has tended to include all types of criticism directed at culture.

The term "cultural criticism" itself has been claimed by Jacques Barzun: No such thing was recognized or in favour when we [i.e. Barzun and Trilling] began—more by intuition than design—in the autumn of 1934. It has been argued that in the inter-war period, the language of literary criticism was adequate for the needs of cultural critics; but that later it mainly served academia. Alan Trachtenberg's Critics of Culture (1976) concentrated on American intellectuals of the 1920s who were "nonacademic" (including H. L. Mencken and Lewis Mumford), where the 1995 collection American Cultural Critics covered mainly later figures, such as F. O. Matthiessen and Susan Sontag, involved in debates on American culture as national.

In contrast, a work such as Richard Wolin's 1995 The Terms of Cultural Criticism: The Frankfurt School, Existentialism, Poststructuralism (1995) uses it as a broad-brush description.

== Victorian sages as critics ==
Cultural critics came to the scene in the nineteenth century. Matthew Arnold and Thomas Carlyle are leading examples of a cultural critic of the Victorian age; in Arnold there is also a concern for religion. John Ruskin was another. Because of an equation made between ugliness of material surroundings and an impoverished life, aesthetes and others might be considered implicitly to be engaging in cultural criticism, but the actual articulation is what makes a critic. In France, Charles Baudelaire was a cultural critic, as was Søren Kierkegaard in Denmark and Friedrich Nietzsche in Germany.

== Twentieth century ==
In the twentieth century Irving Babbitt on the right, and Walter Benjamin on the left, might be considered major cultural critics. The field of play has changed considerably, in that the humanities have broadened to include cultural studies of all kinds, which are grounded in critical theory. This trend is not without its dissidents, however; James Seaton has written extensively in defense of the continued importance of the Humanistic Tradition Irving Babbitt and his heirs championed, while criticizing the dominance of critical theory in the teaching of literature. Theory's Empire: An Anthology of Dissent features a collection of essays from prominent English professors, writers and critics stating their disagreement with the prominent role given to critical theory in English departments.

== Notable contemporary critics ==
- Allan Bloom
- Theodore Dalrymple
- Guy Debord
- Henry Louis Gates Jr.
- Mark Kingwell
- Neil Postman
- Daniel Quinn
- Richard Rorty
- Pierre Schaeffer
- James Seaton
- Fran Lebowitz
- Slavoj Žižek

== See also ==
- Criticism of multiculturalism
- Cultural pessimism
- Counterculture
- Semiotics of culture
- Social criticism
