= Cultural depictions of Thomas Jefferson =

Since his death, Founding Father and third U.S. president Thomas Jefferson has been an iconic American figure depicted in many forms. Jefferson has often been portrayed by Hollywood, and has been depicted in a wide range of forms including alternative timelines, animation, documentary, small cameos, and fictionalized interpretations.

== Currency ==
Since 1869, Jefferson appears on the United States two-dollar bill. In January 1938, the United States Mint announced an open competition for a new design for the American nickel, to replace the Buffalo nickel, to feature early Jefferson on the obverse, and Jefferson's home, Monticello on the reverse. Jefferson has since appeared on these coins, deemed the Jefferson nickel.

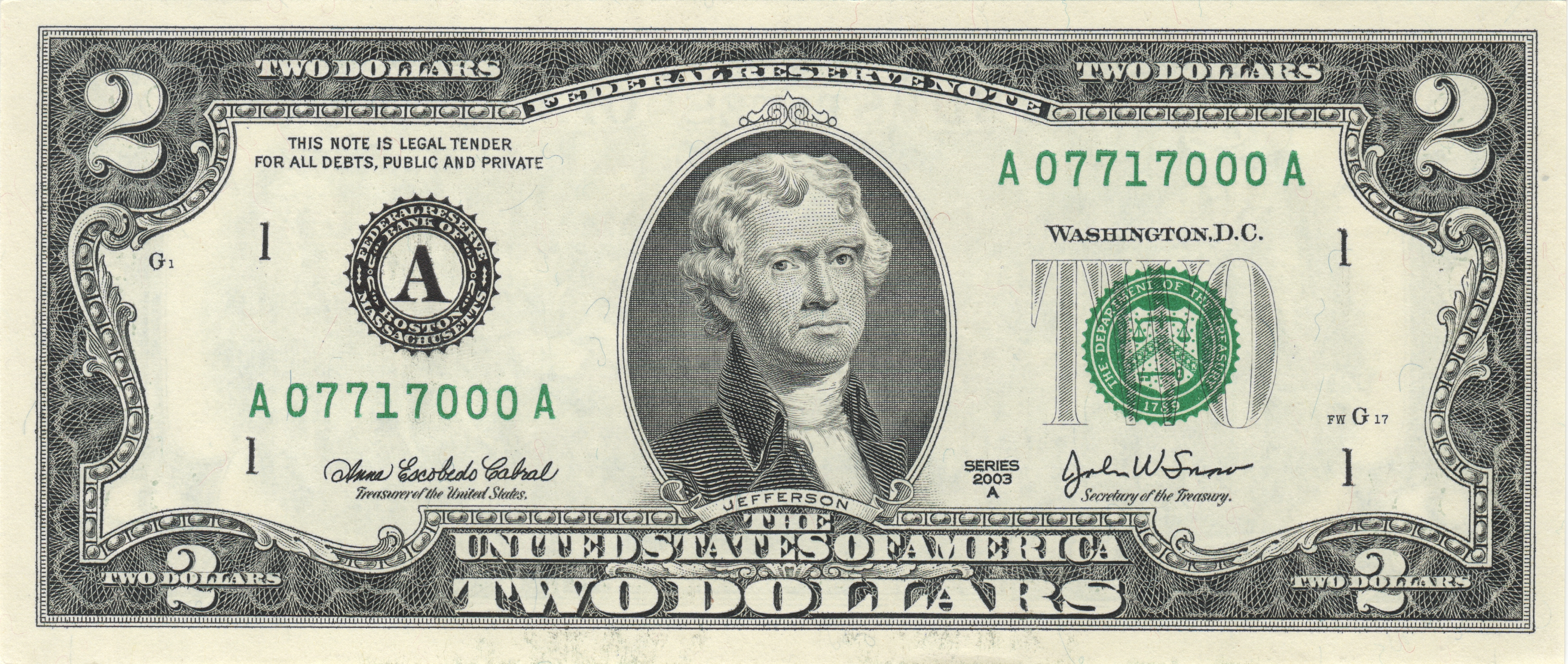
US $2 bill features Thomas Jefferson's portrait.

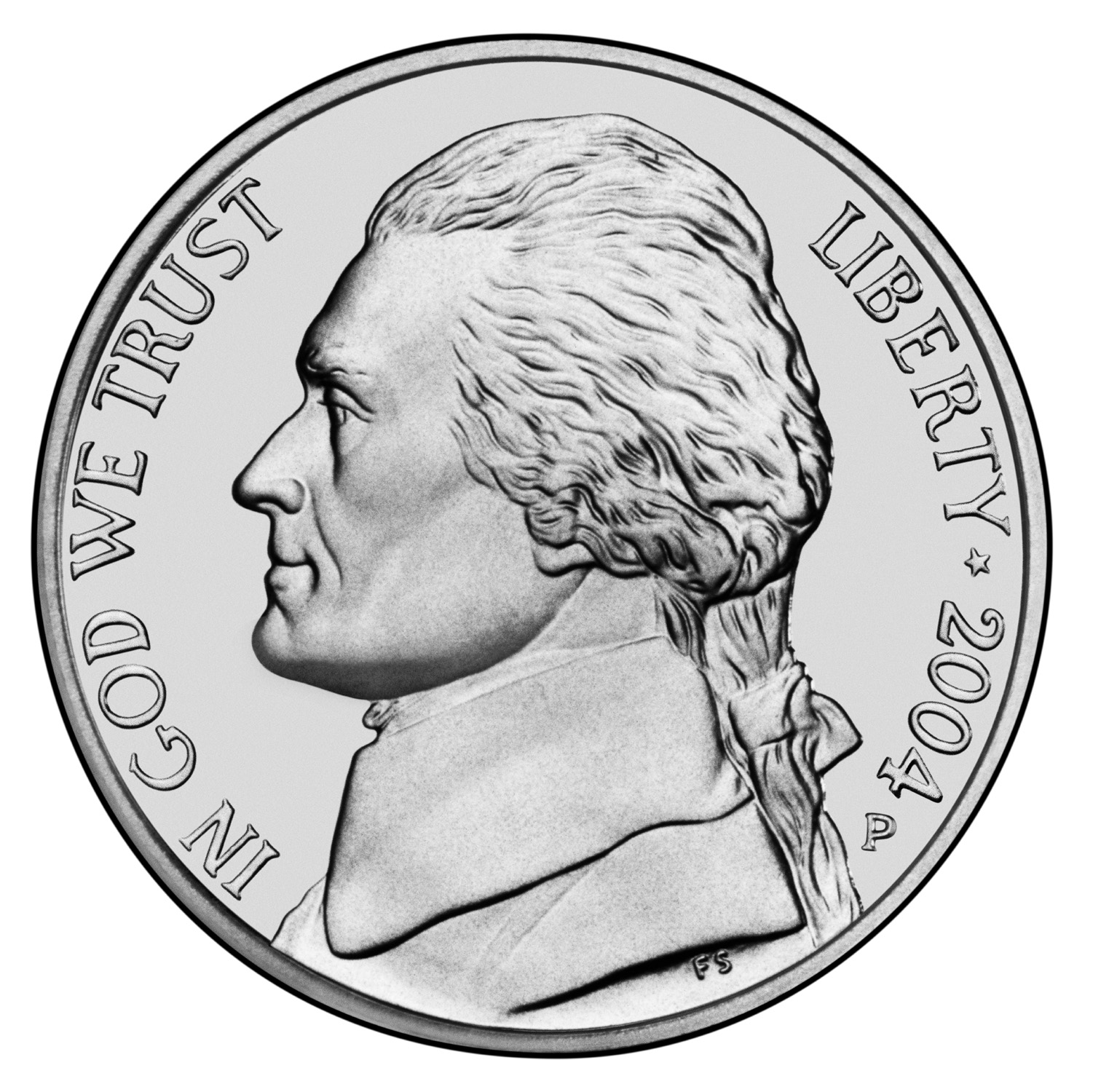
The Jefferson nickel obverse as struck from 1938 to 2004. Coins from pre-1966 lack the designer's initials.

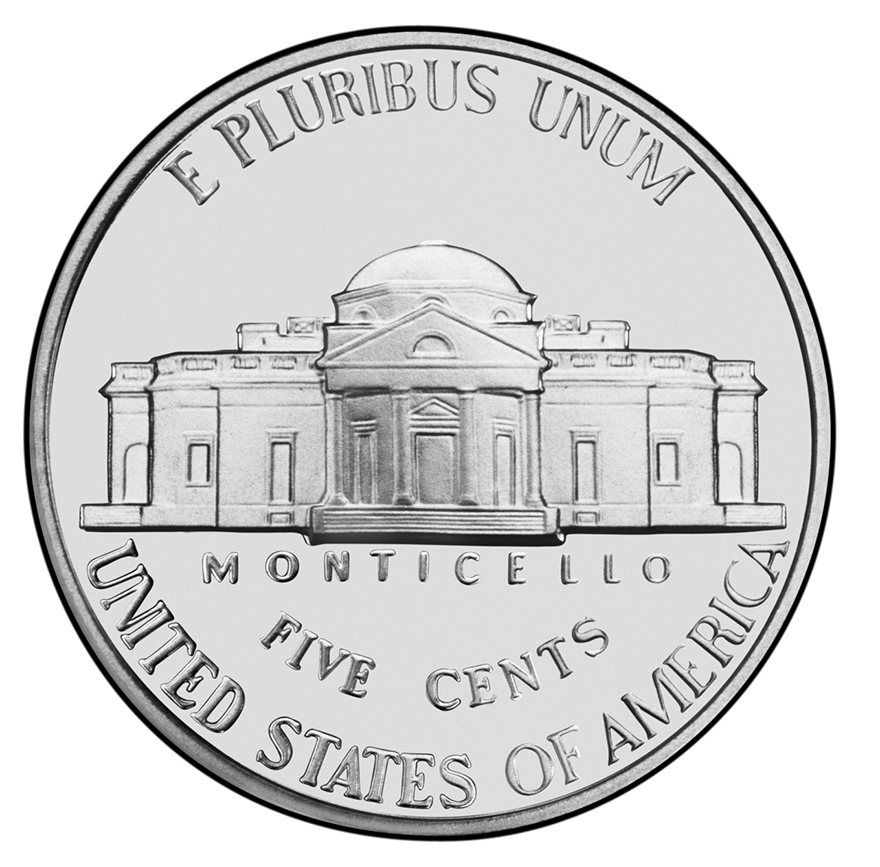
The Jefferson nickel reverse, as struck from 1938 to 2003, features Monticello, Jefferson's home.

== Postage stamps ==
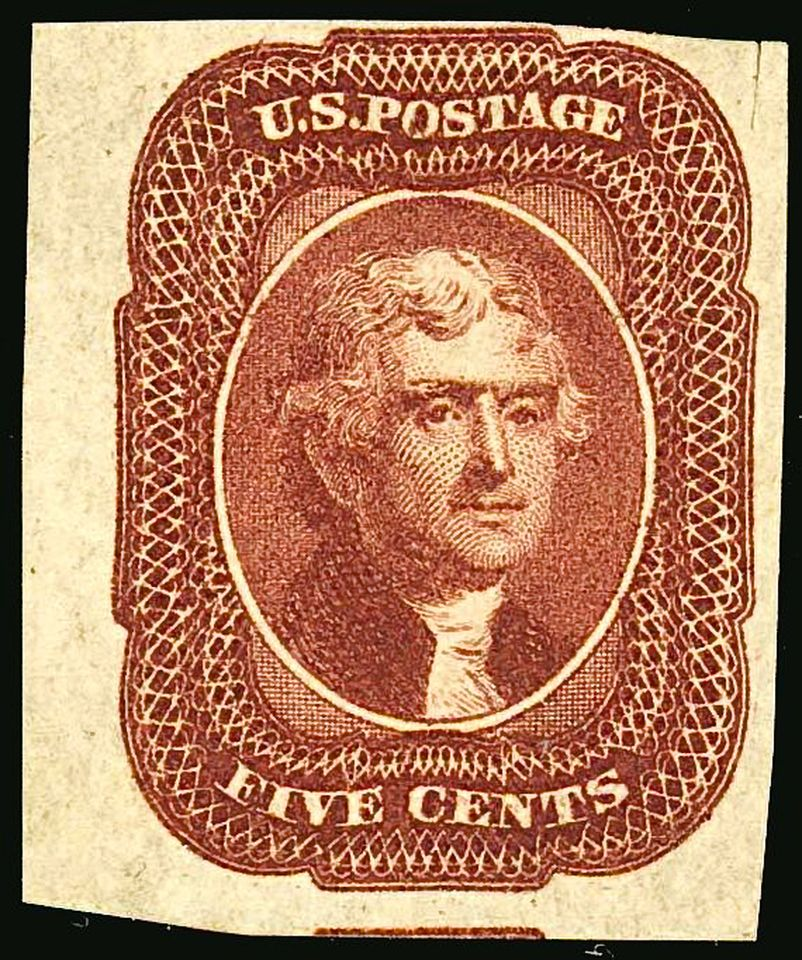
Thomas Jefferson Issue of 1856

Jefferson's likeness over the years has been finely depicted on the face of the various postage issues that honored him. The first issue to depict Jefferson was issued in 1856, nine years after the Post Office issued its first two stamps of Washington and Franklin in 1847. Almost as popular and famous as George Washington, Jefferson appears comparatively less often on U.S. postage issues, and unlike Washington and Franklin, appears on just two commemorative issues, one in 1904, the other on the AMERIPEX presidential issue of 1986. His remaining depictions are confined to regular issues.

On August 19, 1861, while the American Civil War was wreaking havoc across Virginia and elsewhere, the Post Office issued a 5-cent buff (yellow-brown) colored stamp that honored Thomas Jefferson. The engraving used to produce the image was modeled after a portrait by Gilbert Stuart. The engraver for this issue was William Marshall, who also engraved Washington's image for several issues of this period. This Jefferson issue occurs in several distinct shades of brown. This image was again reprinted on February 3, 1863, in a dark brown color. Also in 1861, Jefferson became the first U.S. president to appear on a Confederate stamp: a 10¢ value in blue, reissued in 1862 with its color changed to rose-pink.

== Statues ==
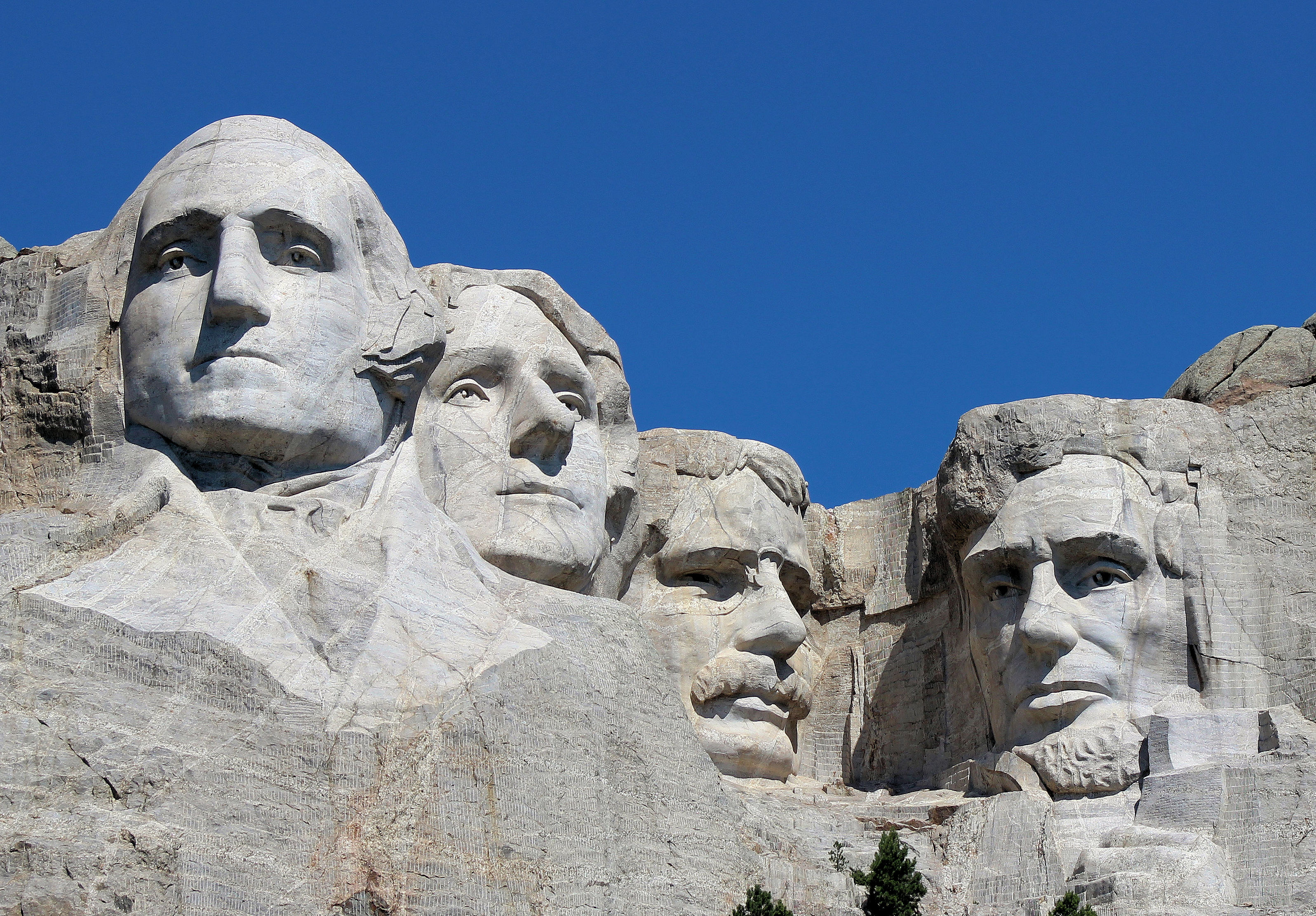
Jefferson is second from the left on Gutzon Borglum's sculpture Shrine of Democracy, commonly known as Mount Rushmore

Statues of Thomas Jefferson can be found in the United States and in other countries.

- List of statues of Thomas Jefferson, including:
  - Thomas Jefferson (Bitter), a 1915 sculpture by Karl Bitter in Portland, Oregon
  - Statue of Thomas Jefferson (Columbia University), a 1914 sculpture by William Ordway Partridge in Manhattan, New York
  - Thomas Jefferson (University of Virginia), a statue in front of the Rotunda

Jefferson is one of the four presidential portrait sculptures carved into Mount Rushmore in South Dakota from 1927 to 1941. It was designed and supervised by sculptor Gutzon Borglum, who called his work the Shrine of Democracy.

== Film, drama, and fiction ==
Clotel; or, The President's Daughter: A Narrative of Slave Life in the United States is an 1853 novel by United States author and playwright William Wells Brown about Clotel and her sister, fictional slave daughters of Thomas Jefferson. Brown, who escaped from slavery in 1834 at the age of 20, published the book in London. He was staying after a lecture tour to evade possible recapture due to the 1850 Fugitive Slave Act. Set in the early nineteenth century, it is considered the first novel published by an African American, and is set in the United States. Three additional versions were published through 1867.

The novel explores slavery's destructive effects on African-American families, the difficult lives of American mulattoes or mixed-race people, and the "degraded and immoral condition of the relation of master and slave in the United States of America". Featuring an enslaved mixed-race woman named Currer and her daughters Althesa and Clotel, fathered by Thomas Jefferson, it is considered a tragic mulatto story. The women's relatively comfortable lives end after Jefferson's death. They confront many hardships, with the women taking heroic action to preserve their families.

- John Litel plays Jefferson in the 1938 film Declaration of Independence, directed by Crane Wilbur
- Ben and Me, a 1953 American animated two-reel short subject produced by Walt Disney Productions, with Hans Conried voicing Thomas Jefferson.
- Herbert Heyes portrayed then President Jefferson in The Far Horizons, a 1955 American historical Western film directed by Rudolph Maté about the Lewis and Clark Expedition.
- 1776 was a 1969 musical with music and lyrics by Sherman Edwards and a book by Peter Stone. Based on the events leading up to the signing of the Declaration of Independence, Jefferson is a major character. The show premiered on Broadway, earning warm reviews, and ran for 1,217 performances. The production won three Tony Awards, including Best Musical. In 1972, it was made into a film adaptation. Actor Ken Howard played Jefferson in both the stage debut and the screen adaptation.
- Day of the Tentacle, a 1993 LucasArts adventure videogame, features time travel as major plot point and Jefferson as a side character.
- Jefferson in Paris, the 1995 film, set in the period 1784–1789, portrays Jefferson when he was US minister to France at Versailles before the French Revolution. The film focuses largely on Jefferson's relationship with Sally Hemings.
- Thomas Jefferson (1997 film). This 1997 two-part American documentary film, directed and produced by Ken Burns, covers the Jefferson's life and times, portraying him as a renaissance man. Not only was he a dedicated public servant, but was also a writer, an inventor, and a noted architect. Burns captures both the public and private person.
- Liberty! (1997 documentary series). Focused on the American Revolutionary War and its instigating factors, this series of six hour-long episodes included stage and screen actors in appropriate period costume reading as figures of the time, including Campbell Scott as Jefferson.
- Liberty's Kids (2002 animated series)
- Thomas Jefferson: Author of America, a short 2005 biography by Christopher Hitchens
- John Adams (2008 miniseries). Jefferson is portrayed by Stephen Dillane
- Fallout 3, released in 2008, features the Jefferson Memorial as a plot point. The memorial is used as home of Project Purity, an attempt to clean water in the Capital Wasteland.
- Jefferson's Garden (2015 play)
- In Hamilton, in both the 2015 musical and the 2020 film, Jefferson is played in a role originated by Daveed Diggs.
- Washington (2020 miniseries); Jefferson is portrayed by Nicholas Audsley.
- Thomas Jefferson, a 2025 six-episode miniseries.

== Other ==
- Wine bottles controversy, in which bottles of wine claimed to have once belonged to Jefferson were sold at auction in 1985, leading to decades of litigation.

== See also ==
- Cultural depictions of Sally Hemings
