= Burning Ambition =

Burning Ambition may refer to:

- Burning Ambition (album), an album by The Generators
- Iron Maiden: Burning Ambition, a music documentary about the band Iron Maiden
