= Casa Xochiquetzal =

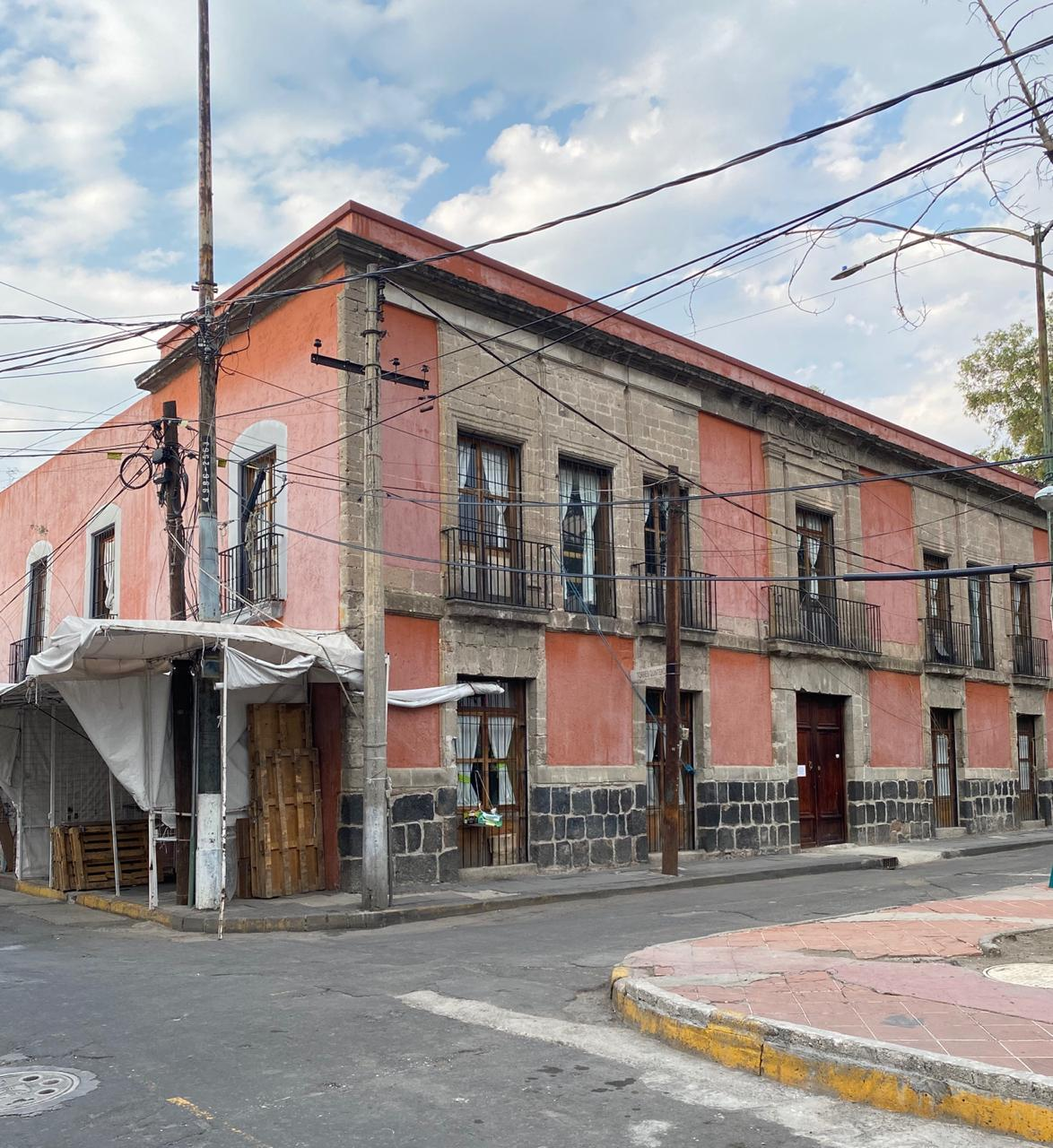
The building that houses Casa Xochiquetzal.

Location of Casa X: Pl. Gregorio Torres Quintero 101, Centro, Cuauhtémoc, 06000 Centro, CDMX, Mexico

Casa Xochiquetzal is a shelter for elderly sex workers located in downtown Mexico City, Mexico. Founded in 2006, it provides residents with meals and mental and physical health resources, with a goal of allowing them to "age with dignity". No other house like Casa Xochiquetzal exists in the Americas, and due to this, it has been featured in many books and documentaries. Since its founding, over 300 women have resided there.

== Founding ==
In the early 2000s, Carmen Muñoz, a retired sex worker, realized many of her fellow sex workers were living on the streets in Mexico City. Saddened by this, she set out to put roofs over their heads. Prominent figures, such as Jesusa Rodríguez, a theater artist, and feminists Marta Lamas and Elena Poniatowska, got involved. In 2003, Rodríguez met with 70 sex workers to discuss sex workers' rights. The elderly women there, many of whom were unhoused, wanted a communal place to live. They then met with Mexico City's mayor at the time, Andrés Manuel López Obrador, who donated an abandoned boxing museum to them. It is located between the neighborhoods of La Merced and Tepito, which have been known for crime, stolen goods, and sex work. Tepito is also known for Santa Muerte. The name Casa Xochiquetzal was adopted from an Aztec goddess known for female sexual power and beauty.

Renovations on Casa Xochiquetzal began in 2005. A year later, the home opened in 2006, originally hosting 30 to 40 women. Since then, the number of women has decreased to around 20. Casa X provides residents with three meals a day, a bed of their own, and bathrooms.

== Residential requirements ==
Originally, Casa Xochiquetzal had three rules for residents: They had to be retired from sex work, older than 65, and not receiving any other support. The rules have since changed. In 2023, Casa Xochiquetzal's youngest resident was 49 years old. The women are also now allowed to continue sex work. To keep the house clean and running, residents must cook and clean for themselves, and attend cooking and crafting workshops daily.

== Resources for residents ==
Some of the residents began sex work at a young age, and by the time they reach Casa X, many have been victims of verbal, physical, and sexual abuse. Many experience mental illness, isolation, and some are suicidal. Some are alienated from their family members, while others have tensions with other residents with whom they compete for clients. To deal with these struggles, many of the residents find comfort in practicing religion.

In addition to providing daily food and a bed, Casa Xochiquetzal provides women with mental health counseling, including visits from psychologists and psychiatrists, and medical care through regularly scheduled doctor's visits. These services are funded by donations from independent organizations and by support from the Mexican government. Casa Xochiquetzal also helps residents obtain social security cards, which give them discounts on services.

In addition to healthcare services, Casa Xochiquetzal offers residents visits from the Beauty Brigade (La Brigada Itinerante de Belleza), which provides free grooming services for people who may not have access to beauty products or salon services. These visits are opportunities for leisure and social interaction, with some brigadistas, Beauty Brigade volunteers, even offering classes, schooling, and photo opportunities.

== Media representation ==
Casa Xochiquetzal has been represented in several books and documentaries, including the following:

=== Books ===
- The Women of Casa X (2013)
  - Malcolm Venville spent a month at Casa X photographing the women and hearing their stories, with many describing prior abuses they endured.
- Las Amorosas Más Bravas (2014)
  - This book is the result of eight years of in-depth journalism by Bénédicte Desrus, a french documentary photographer and Celia Gómez Ramos, a Mexican writer. Las amorosas más bravas (“Tough Love”) presents intimate portraits of the women residing at Casa Xochiquetzal.

=== Documentaries ===
- La Muñeca Fea (2016)
  - This documentary details the community built within Casa X. It shows residents who range from 60 to 95 years old, many of whom are still working, and the struggles they face.
- La Plaza de Soledad (2016)
  - Created by Maya Goded, this film emphasizes the friendships and connections between women at Casa X. Their struggles are still present, "but tragedy never fully settles into the defining narrative of the film".
