= Storror =

British freerunning group

STORROR
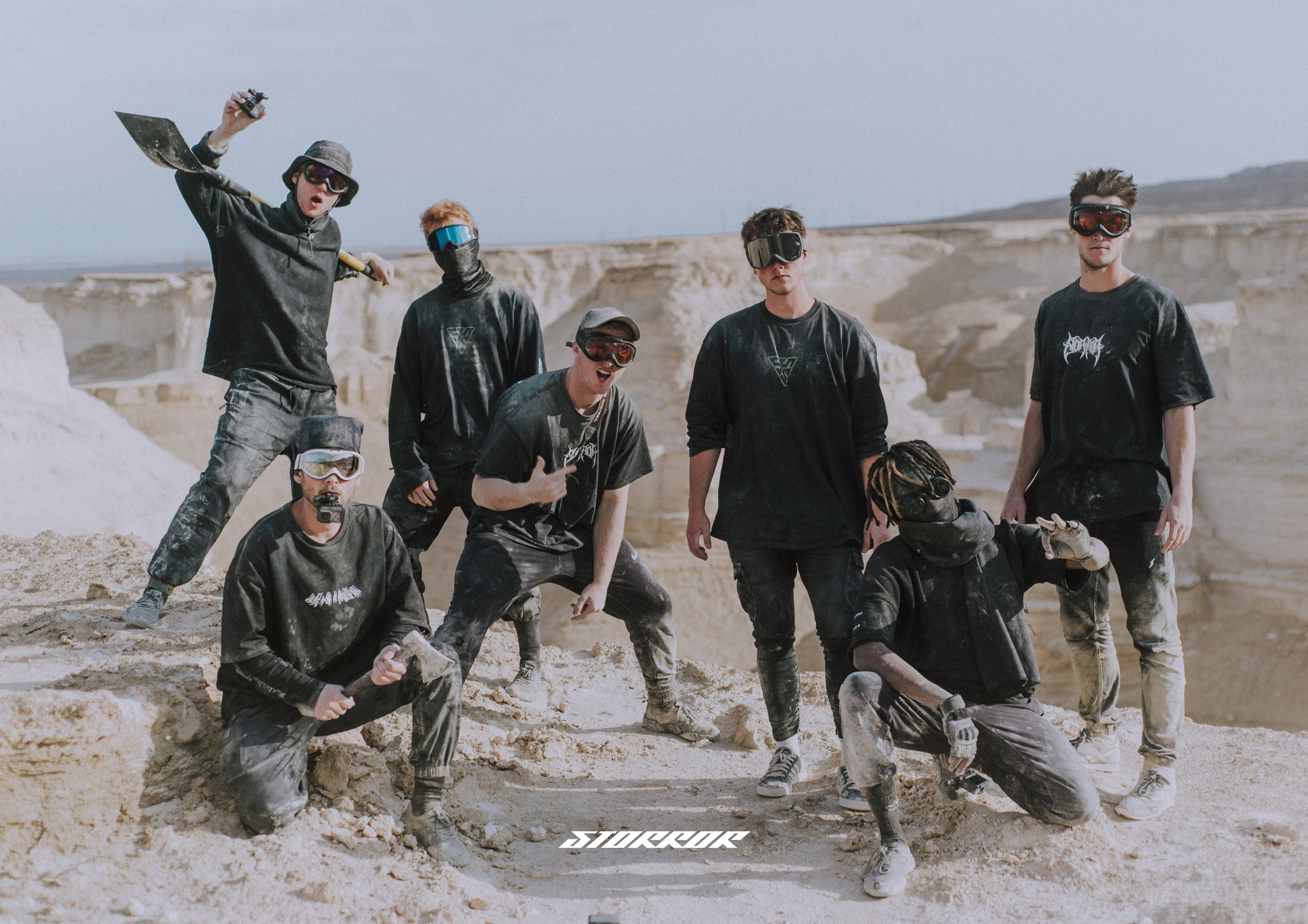
- All 7 original Storror members in the Masada desert, 2019. Front left to right: Max Cave, Josh Burnett-Blake; standing: Benj Cave, Toby Segar, Drew Taylor, Sacha Powell, Callum Powell

YouTube information
- Channel: STORROR
- Years active: 2010–present
- Genres: Parkour; freerunning
- Subscribers: 11 million
- Views: 3.43 billion
- Last updated: May 2026
- Website: www.storror.com

Storror (stylized as STORROR) is a group of parkour and freerunning athletes from the United Kingdom. They run a YouTube channel. Storror was established in 2010 by brothers Max Cave and Benj Cave, as well as Drew Taylor. They were later joined by Toby Segar, Callum Powell, Sacha Powell, and Josh Burnett-Blake. Storror have made the documentaries SuperTramps: Thailand (2015) and Roof Culture Asia (2017). They made their feature film debut in Netflix's 6 Underground (2019).

== History ==
Storror was established in 2010 by seven parkour athletes from Horsham (West Sussex), and Peacehaven (East Sussex) who met as teenagers. The team started with the Cave brothers and Drew Taylor, who were inspired by Jump London (2003) and Jump Britain (2005) documentaries. They began uploading videos to their YouTube channel, originally called StorrorBlog. They later met other members of British parkour communities and in 2010 established the Storror group and YouTube channel.

In 2011 and 2012, the team filmed two cliff jumping videos in Malta that included jumps from the Azure Window. In 2016, team member Max Cave leaped between the roofs of two Hong Kong skyscrapers and uploaded it to Instagram. They also filmed several other videos in Hong Kong which were published later.

In May 2017, Storror apologized for stunts performed at Joshua Tree National Park.

In September 2017, the team released their second documentary (the first being SuperTramps: Thailand) Roof Culture Asia, which features stunts made on the rooftops of Hong Kong, Tokyo and Seoul. They monetized this video through Vimeo. Storror made their feature film debut in Netflix's 6 Underground, released on 13 December 2019. They worked closely with director Michael Bay to perform parkour stunts on famous sites, such as the Florence Cathedral in Italy. In 2025, the group announced We Are Storror, a documentary film centered on the team that is directed by Michael Bay.

In 2026, three of the team's core seven members (Drew, Callum, Josh) left the team for various reasons.

Alongside the documentary, Storror has expanded into the gaming industry with Storror Parkour Pro.

== Team members ==
As of August 2026, the active Storror team consists of:

- Max Cave
- Benj Cave
- Toby Segar – Ninja Warrior UK finalist in 2015 and 2016
- Sacha Powell

Former and inactive members are:

- Drew Taylor – Guinness world record holder, who amicably parted ways with Storror in August of 2026 to focus on his own projects
- Josh Burnett-Blake - Removed from the team in mid-2026.
- Callum Powell - Removed from the team in mid-2026 after pleading guilty to charges of possessing indecent images of children.
