= Theodore Roosevelt (miniseries) =

Television miniseries

- Promotional poster
- Genre: Historical drama
- Based on: The Bully Pulpit by Doris Kearns Goodwin
- Directed by: Malcolm Venville
- Starring: Rufus Jones; Aubrey Shelton; Mark Elderkin
- Composer: Giovanni Rios
- Country of origin: United States
- Original language: English
- No. of episodes: 2

Production
- Executive producers: Doris Kearns Goodwin; Martin Scorsese; Jennifer Davisson; Leonardo DiCaprio; Mary Donahue; Zara Duffy; Beth Laski; Eli Lehrer; Jennifer Wagnan; Knute Walker
- Cinematography: Luis David Sansans
- Editors: Emmet Adier; Dave Marcus; David Mehlman; Joshua Pearson; Thomas Vengris
- Production companies: RadicalMedia; Appian Way Productions; Lionsgate Television

Original release
- Network: History
- Release: May 30 – May 31, 2022

Theodore Roosevelt is a 2022 American television documentary miniseries directed by Malcolm Venville. The two-part miniseries chronicles the life of Theodore Roosevelt, the twenty-sixth President of the United States and premiered on May 30, 2022, on History.

== Episodes ==
No.	Title	Directed by	Written by	Original release date	U.S. viewers (millions)
1	"The Great Adventure"	Malcolm Venville	Scott Bloom; Elizabeth Bull	May 30, 2022	N/A
After seeing the President Lincoln's funeral procession go by, a young sickly "TR" Theodore Roosevelt must be strong for America on the brink of global expansion. Born into wealth and privilege, Roosevelt learns from his late philanthropic father's teachings to make his mark in the world. He becomes an assemblyman and fought for the lower classes who were living in unhealthy tenements. After the deaths of his beloved wife and mother on the same day in 1884, he sets out into the Badlands to escape the city and toughen up in the rugged frontier. When he returns, he sees the best way to help the less fortunate was continuing with politics and fixing problems by law. He marries his childhood sweetheart Edith Kermit Carow, gets a job in civil service, and moves to Washington, D.C. They live in the capital for six years, growing his family until he itches to clean up the corruption in his hometown, becoming the New York Police Commissioner. Then he campaigns for William McKinley, who gives him the job of assistant secretary of the Navy, strengthening it by the late 1890s. When the Cubans revolt against Spanish colonialism, TR stresses America help the oppressed after the U.S.S. Maine sinks and incites the Spanish-American War in 1898. TR forms the first volunteer cavalry, the Rough Riders under his leadership of colonel. They capture San Juan Hill, winning the war and making him a hero. After he campaigned across the state and won the election of New York's governor. He created better working environments, and franchises had to pay a special tax, causing the Republicans to see him as a reformer. In order to repress his ideas, they offer him the vice presidency, but their plan soon backfires when McKinley is assassinated.
2	"The Man in the Arena"	Malcolm Venville	Scott Bloom; Elizabeth Bull	May 31, 2022	N/A
After his predecessor died, Theodore Roosevelt, at 42-years-old becomes the youngest president of the United States, ushering in the industrial age in 1901. He moves into the Executive Mansion, nicknaming it the White House with six energetic kids like himself, becoming the first celebrity president. But America still has a turbulent history, especially with racial tension in the South. In his first term, TR violates the racial etiquette when he invites Booker T. Washington to dinner, upsetting white supremacists. Then he turns his attention to capitalists like J.P. Morgan's railroad monopoly by taxing them and helps resolve the coal miners strike, establishing a worker's union before people run out of coal for the winter. Through the press, TR also takes on J.D. Rockefeller who has the power and money to influence members of Congress. He builds the Panama Canal to establish quicker trade routes. For his second term, TR uses the bully pulpit to propose his Square Deal for equality for everyone. He exposes the unsanitary meat industry and saves millions of acres of forest reserve by creating national parks. After not wanting to run for a third term in 1908, TR hand-picks William H. Taft to be his successor if he sticks to his policies. At age 50, TR travels to Africa and Europe, but when he comes home in 1910, he misses the power of the presidency as Taft is doing a terrible job. TR becomes a radical progressive with reforms on 8-hour workdays, medical insurance, and supporting women's suffrage. After seeing the Oval Office built, he decides to run again in 1912, this time with the people's support. But when he didn't get the Republican nomination, he formed the Progressive Party or the Bull Moose Party, made up of middle class and feminists. TR gave an 84-minute speech after getting shot in the chest by an assailant, with only his steel eyeglass case saving his life. But Democrat Woodrow Wilson ran as a more extreme progressive and won by a landslide. After his loss, TR visits Brazil to go on an expedition to navigate the River of Doubt where he almost dies of malaria. He comes home to the crisis of World War I and after he is denied, his four sons join up to fight—his youngest, Quentin was shot down in a dogfight in 1918. When these soldiers came home, TR demanded pensions and disability for them, wanting to run for president in 1920. However, his body was in miserable shape, Roosevelt dies in his sleep of an aneurysm at his home on January 6, 1919 at 60 years old. He had gone out as a president who defined America and helped the country go in a different direction for the common good.

== Main cast ==
- Rufus Jones as Theodore Roosevelt
- Aubrey Shelton as William McKinley
- Mark Elderkin as Leonard Wood

== See also ==
- Washington (2020 History Channel miniseries)
- Grant (2020 History Channel miniseries)
- Abraham Lincoln (2022 History Channel miniseries)
- FDR (2023 History Channel miniseries)
- Kennedy (2023 History Channel miniseries)
- Thomas Jefferson (2025 History Channel miniseries)
