= Abraham Lincoln (miniseries) =

Television miniseries

- Promotional poster
- Genre: War drama Historical drama
- Directed by: Malcolm Venville
- Starring: Graham Sibley; Justin Salinger; Colin Moss; Jenny Stead
- Composer: Kurt Farquhar
- Country of origin: United States
- Original language: English
- No. of episodes: 3

Production
- Executive producer: Doris Kearns Goodwin
- Producer: Patrick Altema

Original release
- Network: History
- Release: February 20 – February 22, 2022

Abraham Lincoln is a 2022 American television miniseries directed by Malcolm Venville. The three-part miniseries chronicles the life of Abraham Lincoln, the sixteenth President of the United States and premiered on February 20, 2022, on History. The miniseries was released as a 5-hour and 21-minute DVD.

== Overview ==
Executive produced by historian Doris Kearns Goodwin, the series was based on Goodwin's 2018 book, Leadership in Turbulent Times. Goodwin also provided on-camera, expert analyses for the series of key moments in Lincoln's life and presidency. In addition, the series' three episodes featured analyses by other prominent historians who providing insights into Lincoln's life and the history of America before and during the American Civil War. Contributing historians included: Catherine Clinton, Christy S. Coleman, Allen C. Guelzo, Harold Holzer, Caroline Janney, and Edna Greene Medford, as well as other prominent Americans including former U.S. President Barack Obama and former U.S. Army General Stanley A. McChrystal.

== Main cast ==
- Graham Sibley as Abraham Lincoln
- Justin Salinger as Ulysses S. Grant
- Colin Moss as William H. Seward
- Jenny Stead as Mary Todd Lincoln
- Wayne Harrison as Edwin Stanton
- Stefan Adegbola as Frederick Douglass

== Episodes ==
This 2022 miniseries presented more than five hours of programming during its three-episode run, and, as of 2024, was still being made available on streaming video services. The three episodes were:

No.	Title	Directed by	Written by	Original release date	U.S. viewers (millions)
1	"The Railsplitter"	Malcolm Venville	Frederick Rendina	February 20, 2022	N/A
Through a poverty-ridden childhood on the American frontier, Abraham Lincoln is determined to leave his mark on the world.
2	"A President at War"	Malcolm Venville	Frederick Rendina and Sundi Lofty	February 21, 2022	N/A
With the Civil War fully underway, Abraham Lincoln is forced to quickly learn how to manage a military as commander in chief.
3	"Saving the Union"	Malcolm Venville	Frederick Rendina and Rebecca Sue Haber	February 22, 2022	N/A
As casualties mount in the raging Civil War, Abraham Lincoln seeks a general who can end it once and for all. When the end draws near, he begins to think about what comes next for the nation and its former slaves.

== See also ==
- Washington (2020 History Channel miniseries)
- Grant (2020 History Channel miniseries)
- Theodore Roosevelt (2022 History Channel miniseries)
- FDR (2023 History Channel miniseries)
- Kennedy (2023 History Channel miniseries)
- Thomas Jefferson (2025 History Channel miniseries)
