= Grant (miniseries) =

American television miniseries

- Promotional poster
- Genre: War drama Historical drama
- Based on: Grant by Ron Chernow
- Screenplay by: Nicholas Greene; Frederick Rendina
- Directed by: Malcolm Venville
- Starring: Justin Salinger; Carel Nel; Dianne Simpson; Craig Jackson; Brian Heydenrych; Daniel Fox
- Composer: Jacob Shea
- Country of origin: United States
- Original language: English
- No. of episodes: 3

Production
- Executive producers: Leonardo DiCaprio; Jennifer Davisson; Dave Sirulnick; Jon Kamen; Justin Wilkes; Fisher Stevens; Ron Chernow; Phillip Watson; Michael Hampton; Knute Walker
- Producer: Alexander H. Browne
- Cinematography: Luis David Sansans
- Editor: Joshua L. Pearson
- Production companies: RadicalMedia; Appian Way Productions; Lionsgate Television

Original release
- Network: History
- Release: May 25 – May 27, 2020

Grant is a 2020 American television miniseries directed by Malcolm Venville. Based on Ron Chernow's bestselling 2017 non-fiction book, the three-part series chronicles the life of Ulysses S. Grant, the eighteenth President of the United States. It premiered on May 25, 2020 on the History channel.

== Main cast ==
- Justin Salinger as Ulysses S. Grant
- Carel Nel as Abraham Lincoln
- Dianne Simpson as Julia Grant
- Craig Jackson as General Henry Halleck
- Francis Chouler as John Rawlins
- Jason K. Ralph as General William Sherman
- Brian Heydenrych as Robert E. Lee
- Daniel Fox as Colonel Charles Marshall

== Episodes ==
No.	Title	Directed by	Written by	Original release date	U.S. viewers (millions)
1	"Unlikely Hero"	Malcolm Venville	Nicholas Greene & Frederick Rendina	May 25, 2020	2.97
In one of the unlikeliest stories in American history, Ulysses S. Grant rises from his humble beginnings to the most successful general in the Civil War. As a child in Ohio, he helps his father with his tanning business. Then is sent off to military school, becoming an underachieving cadet at West Point. Grant serves as a quartermaster in the Mexican-American War, and marries Julia Dent, the daughter of a slave-owner in White Haven, Missouri. He is then stationed at Fort Humboldt where he is melancholic without his wife and two sons, and starts to drink heavily. After resigning from the U.S. Army, he adjusts to civilian life in Illinois where he learns of a lawyer named Abraham Lincoln who is running for president to end slavery. When the southern states secede from the Union, Grant is thrust into war once again, first in the messy Battle of Belmont. He then takes out Fort Henry and Fort Donelson with Commander Foote and his Navy gun boats, and finally wins the long, bloody Battle of Shiloh in Tennessee alongside General Sherman in 1862.
2	"Lincoln's General"	Malcolm Venville	Nicholas Greene & Frederick Rendina	May 26, 2020	2.81
Seven weeks after the bloodbath of Shiloh, Major General Ulysses S. Grant is sidelined by his superior General Halleck in Corinth where the Rebels had evacuated. Instead, Grant sets his sights on Vicksburg and takes incredible risks in crossing the mighty Mississippi River. He first wins the Battle of Jackson and then the Siege of Vicksburg where he gets a glimpse of freed slaves wanting to fight alongside his soldiers. President Lincoln creates the Emancipation Proclamation in 1863 to call all black people to arms and put them in Union blue uniforms. He combines three armies into a single conflict in Chattanooga, proclaiming victory on Missionary Ridge. Grant finally meets Abraham Lincoln in person at the White House where the president makes him his favorite, promoting him to lieutenant general, commander of the entire Union army. Then Grant prepares for an epic clash with Confederate General Robert E. Lee at the exhausting Battle of the Wilderness of Spotsylvania County in Lee's home state of Virginia in 1864.
3	"Freedom's Champion"	Malcolm Venville	Nicholas Greene & Frederick Rendina	May 27, 2020	2.78
Ulysses S. Grant focuses on defeating Robert E. Lee in Richmond, the capital of the Confederacy. But it's not easily accomplished as Grant's failed campaign in the Battle of Cold Harbor gives him the alias "The Butcher". Then Grant's commanders put the wrong man, James Ledlie, in charge, causing major casualties in the Battle of the Crater at Petersburg when a mine explosion created a deep crater in the ground and he plunders his battalion into the onslaught. By 1864, Grant's grand plan is set into motion when General Sherman captures Atlanta before the re-election of Lincoln. Grant defeats Lee in Jetersville. And on April 9, 1865, Grant meets Lee at the Wilbur McLean House in Appomattox where he surrenders, thus winning the Civil War. A week later, Lincoln is assassinated by John Wilkes Booth at Ford's Theater. After Andrew Johnson makes a mess of the aftermath, General in Chief Grant is called to serve as the 18th president of the United States during one of the most difficult times in America's history; the Reconstruction era, the black codes conflicts, the New Orleans massacre of 1866 and taking on the newly-formed Ku Klux Klan in the South. Grant finishes two terms, travels the world with Julia, writes his manuscript with Mark Twain, and contracts throat cancer. In 1885, he dies a hero's death as the "savior of America".

== See also ==
- Ulysses S. Grant (2002 documentary)
- Washington (2020 History Channel miniseries)
- Abraham Lincoln (2022 History Channel miniseries)
- Theodore Roosevelt (2022 History Channel miniseries)
- FDR (2023 History Channel miniseries)
- Kennedy (2023 History Channel miniseries)
- Thomas Jefferson (2025 History Channel miniseries)
