= Kennedy (2023 miniseries) =

Television miniseries

- Promotional poster
- Genre: Historical drama
- Created by: Ashton Gleckman
- Narrated by: Peter Coyote
- Composers: Ashton Gleckman; Michael Frankenberger; Cameron Moody
- Country of origin: United States
- Original language: English
- No. of episodes: 8

Production
- Executive producers: Jon Kamen; Dave Sirulnick; Ashton Gleckman; Eli Lehrer; Mary E. Donahue; Zachary G. Behr
- Production company: RadicalMedia

Original release
- Network: History
- Release: November 18 – November 20, 2023

Kennedy is a 2023 American television documentary miniseries. The eight-part miniseries chronicles the life of John F. Kennedy, the thirty-fifth President of the United States and premiered on November 18, 2023, on History.

== Episodes ==
No.	Title	Directed by	Written by	Original release date	U.S. viewers (millions)
1	"Jack (1917–1940)"	Unknown	Unknown	November 18, 2023	N/A
2	"The World at War (1940–1946)"	Unknown	Unknown	November 18, 2023	N/A
3	"Into the Political Jungle (1946–1956)"	Unknown	Unknown	November 18, 2023	N/A
4	"The Kennedy Machine (1956–1960)"	Unknown	Unknown	November 19, 2023	N/A
5	"The Torch Has Passed (January 1961 – December 1961)"	Unknown	Unknown	November 19, 2023	N/A
6	"Crisis (January 1962 – October 1962)"	Unknown	Unknown	November 19, 2023	N/A
7	"The Brink of War (October 1962 – June 1963)"	Unknown	Unknown	November 20, 2023	N/A
8	"A Legacy (June 1963 – November 1963)"	Unknown	Unknown	November 20, 2023	N/A

== See also ==
- Washington (2020 History Channel miniseries)
- Grant (2020 History Channel miniseries)
- Abraham Lincoln (2022 History Channel miniseries)
- Theodore Roosevelt (2022 History Channel miniseries)
- FDR (2023 History Channel miniseries)
- Thomas Jefferson (2025 History Channel miniseries)
