= Remote control (disambiguation) =

A remote control is any device used to control a remote operation.

Remote control may also refer to:

== Film, television and theatre ==
- Remote Control (1930 film), a film starring William Haines
- Remote Control (1988 film), a film starring Kevin Dillon
- Remote Control (1992 film), an Icelandic movie
- Remote Control, a 1972 film from Hollis Frampton's Hapax Legomena cycle
- Remote Control (game show), a 1987–1990 American game show
- Remote Control, an Indian TV series featuring Mansi Parekh
- "Remote Control" (Flashpoint), a 2009 episode of Flashpoint
- "Remote Control" (The Zeta Project), an episode of The Zeta Project
- "Remote Control", an episode of LazyTown
- "Remote Control", an episode of Modern Marvels
- Remote Control, a musical by Robert Steadman
- "The Remote Control", an episode of Pocoyo

== Literature ==
- Remote Control (McNab novel), a 1997 novel by Andy McNab starting the Nick Stone Missions novel series
- Remote Control (Heath novel), 2007 by Jack Heath
- Remote Control (Isaka novel), 2011 by Kōtarō Isaka
- Remote Control (novella), a 2021 novella by Nnedi Okorafor

== Music ==
=== Albums ===
- Remote Control (The Tubes album), 1979
- Remote Control (TVT album), the 7th volume of the Television's Greatest Hits series of compilation albums by TVT Records

=== Songs ===
- "Remote Control" (Beastie Boys song), 1999
- "Remote Control" (Kanye West song), 2021
- "Remote Control" (The Clash song), 1977
- "Remote Control" (The Reddings song), 1980
- "Remote Control", a song by Age of Electric
- "Remote Control", a song by Suzi Quatro from Main Attraction
- "Remote Control (Me)", a song by Electric Six from Fire

== Video games ==
- Remote Control (video game), a game for the NES produced by Hi Tech Expressions

== Companies ==
- Remote Control Productions (American company), a film music company run by Hans Zimmer
- Remote Control Productions (German company), a video game studio
- Remote Control Records, an Australian record label

== See also ==
- Remote control software or remote desktop software
- Remote control vehicle
- Remote keyless system
- Remotely Controlled, an album by Christian humorist Mark Lowry
- Universal remote
- Radio control
- Teleoperation, controlling something remotely
