= 6 Underground (film) =

2019 film by Michael Bay

- Release poster
- Directed by: Michael Bay
- Written by: Paul Wernick; Rhett Reese
- Produced by: Ian Bryce; Michael Bay; David Ellison; Dana Goldberg; Don Granger
- Starring: Ryan Reynolds; Mélanie Laurent; Adria Arjona; Corey Hawkins; Manuel Garcia-Rulfo; Ben Hardy; Dave Franco; Payman Maadi
- Cinematography: Bojan Bazelli
- Edited by: Roger Barton; William Goldenberg; Calvin Wimmer
- Music by: Lorne Balfe
- Production companies: Skydance; Bay Films; Reese Wernick Productions; Ian Bryce Productions
- Distributed by: Netflix
- Release dates: December 10, 2019 (The Shed); December 13, 2019 (United States)
- Running time: 128 minutes
- Country: United States
- Language: English
- Budget: $150 million

6 Underground is a 2019 American action film directed by Michael Bay and written by Paul Wernick and Rhett Reese. The film stars Ryan Reynolds, Mélanie Laurent, Manuel Garcia-Rulfo, Adria Arjona, Corey Hawkins, Ben Hardy, and Dave Franco. Bay produced the film with his longtime business partner Ian Bryce and Skydance's David Ellison, Dana Goldberg and Don Granger. It follows a group of people who fake their deaths and decide to form a vigilante team in order to stage a coup d'état against a ruthless dictator.

With a budget of $150 million, 6 Underground is one of the most expensive Netflix original films ever. The film premiered at The Shed in New York City on December 10, 2019, and was released on Netflix on December 13, 2019. It received mixed reviews, with criticism for Bay's direction.

== Plot ==
Four years after witnessing the horrors of a brutal regime in the fictional Central Asian nation of Turgistan, American billionaire and philanthropist Magnet S. Johnson, who made his fortune from inventing neodymium magnets, fakes his own death to form an anonymous vigilante squad to take down criminals and terrorists which the world as a whole either cannot or will not pursue. Known as One, he recruits five others to abandon their pasts and join his cause, each given a numbered nickname similar to his own: Two, a spy; Three, a hitman; Four, a parkour runner and thief; Five, a doctor; and Six, a driver. They refer to themselves collectively as ghosts.

On their first mission in Florence, Italy, the team interrogates the lawyer of Turgistan's four highest-ranking generals for information on those generals before driving across the city in a dayglow green Alfa Romeo Giulia Quadrifoglio while chased by the Mafia and the Italian police. Six is killed just as they get away.

Days later, One recruits Blaine, a former sniper from Delta Force suffering from survivor guilt as he was ordered not to save his team in Afghanistan. He is convinced to fake his suicide and is renamed Seven. One plans to stage a coup d'état to topple the government of Turgistan dictator Rovach Alimov and install Alimov's imprisoned brother, Murat—a staunch supporter of democracy—as the country's new leader. It is revealed that in the past, then–CIA spy Two had reluctantly captured Murat and handed him back to Rovach.

The ghosts assassinate Rovach's generals in Las Vegas, learn of Murat's location, and successfully extract Murat from his penthouse imprisonment in Hong Kong. During the extraction, Four is caught by one of Rovach's men, who begins severely beating him. Seven is unwilling to subscribe to One's philosophy that "the mission always comes first," instead following his personal philosophy to never leave a teammate behind. Ignoring One's protests, Seven manages to save Four. Afterward, Seven convinces all but One to reveal their real names.

In Turgistan, One sets his plan in motion by hacking the state-run television station during Rovach's public address to the nation and giving Murat the platform he needs to spread his message of democracy. Murat's impromptu speech inspires a citizen revolt, and strategic explosions in the city force Rovach to evacuate to his private yacht. The ghosts storm the yacht and One activates a magnetic pulse invention to incapacitate the guards. When the yacht is immobilized in the middle of the ocean and Four is once again in mortal danger, One chooses to save Four instead of capturing Rovach. Rovach flees by helicopter only to discover it to be commandeered by Murat and the ghosts, who drop him helpless in a refugee camp where he is beaten to death by an angry mob.

In the aftermath of the revolution, Murat becomes Turgistan's new president and the ghosts part ways until their next mission is determined. Two and Three begin a relationship. Four and Five go climbing together. One and Seven travel to New York City. Seven tosses his gun into a nearby river but keeps the last remaining bullet, and One watches from a distance as the woman he loved before his faked death plays with her young son, who is implied to be One's son as well.

== Cast ==
- Ryan Reynolds as One / Magnet S. Johnson (The Billionaire)
- Mélanie Laurent as Two / Camille (C.I.A. Spook)
- Manuel Garcia-Rulfo as Three / Javier (The Hitman)
- Ben Hardy as Four / Billy (The Skywalker)
- Adria Arjona as Five / Amelia (The Doctor)
- Dave Franco as Six / David (The Driver)
- Corey Hawkins as Seven / Blaine
- Lior Raz as Rovach Alimov
- Payman Maadi as Murat Alimov
- Yuri Kolokolnikov as Baasha
- Kim Kold as Daqeeq
- Elena Rusconi as Arianna

== Production ==
=== Development ===
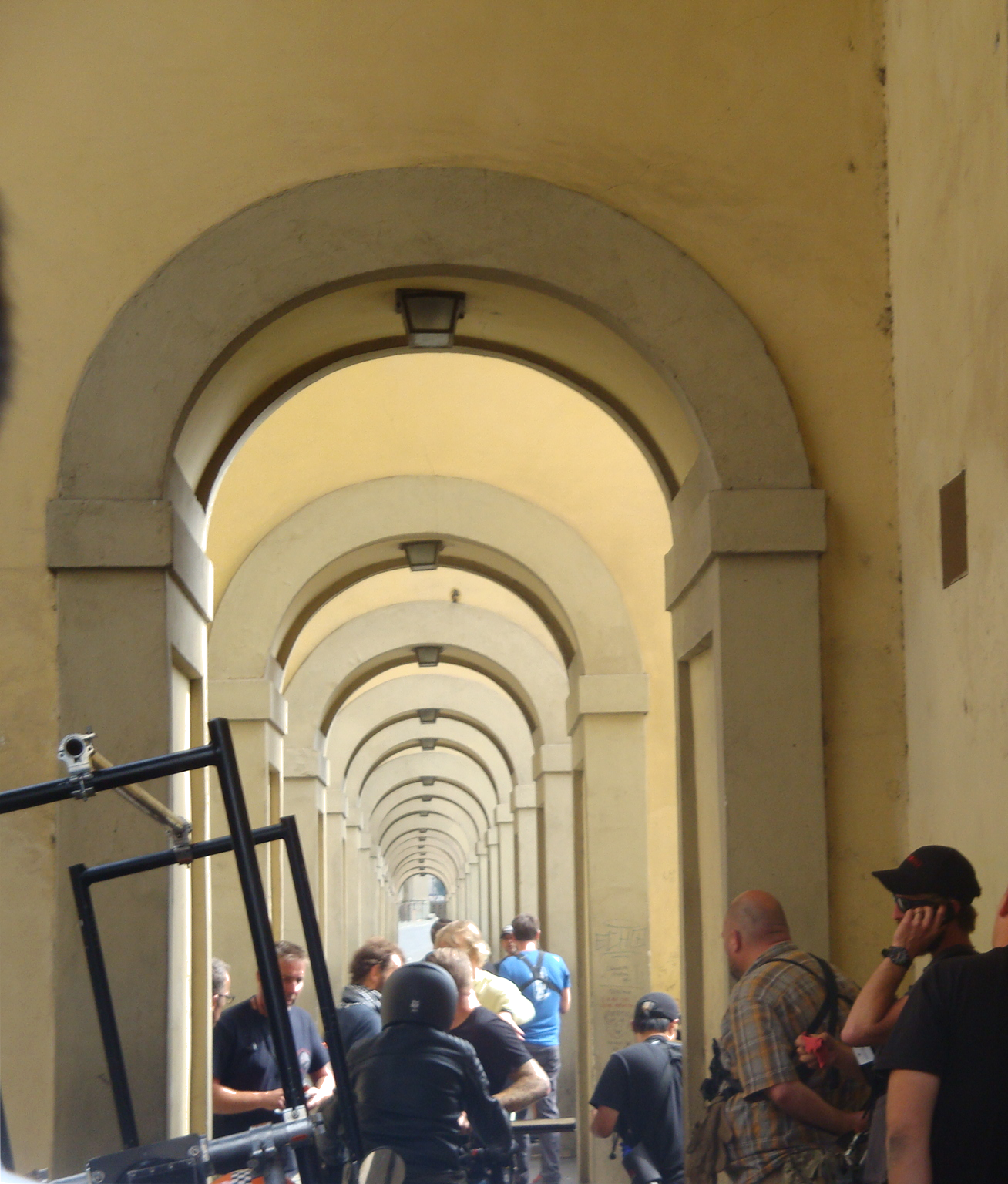
Filming in Florence in September 2018

On March 7, 2018, it was reported that Michael Bay would direct two new feature-length movies, with one of them being the action-thriller film 6 Underground, originally intended to be released in the summer of the following year. Screenwriters Paul Wernick and Rhett Reese, who previously worked in the Deadpool film series were confirmed to be the writers for the script. It was announced that the film would be produced by Skydance Media's David Ellison, Dana Goldberg and Don Granger, along with Bay. In May, it was reported that Netflix would distribute the film, which they intend to be a new action franchise.

In May 2018, it was announced that Ryan Reynolds would be part of the film as the lead role. In July 2018, Dave Franco, Manuel Garcia-Rulfo, Adria Arjona, Corey Hawkins, Ben Hardy and Lior Raz joined the cast. The next month, Mélanie Laurent and Peyman Maadi were announced as part of the cast

=== Filming ===
Principal production commenced on July 30, 2018. Over the subsequent months, shooting would be completed in several cities of Italy, in Los Angeles, Budapest, and in the United Arab Emirates cities of Al Ain, Liwa Oasis, Ras Al Khaimah, Sharjah, Al Jazirah Al Hamra (standing in for Nigeria and Afghanistan) and particularly in the Emirate of Abu Dhabi. In the UAE, 24 locations were used, some standing in for Las Vegas, Afghanistan, California, Hong Kong and the fictional Turgistan. The UAE military worked with the crew, providing soldiers as extras as well as aircraft that appear in the film. Production designer Jeffrey Beecroft made this comment: "I've shot a lot of military stuff with Michael [Bay], but I never had the ability to have six Apache [helicopters], ten Black Hawks and soldiers".

In Italy, some filming was also done at Cinecittà Studios in Rome and on the Whisper, a superyacht rented from Pakistani-American businessman Shahid Khan. The lengthy car chase, set in the historic center of Florence, consisted of sequences filmed in Florence itself, between August 22 and September 22, 2018, but also in Siena, Rome, and Taranto. Michael Bay was able to obtain permits to close streets to film the speeding cars. In an interview, Bay expressed some surprise that Florence had allowed filming of the car chase in its historic area. "There's a lot of priceless stuff in this movie," he said, "like where we have cars flying between an obelisk. Why they allowed me to have flying cars by an obelisk that's 800 years old, I don't know. But we didn't hurt anything." After Bay watched their videos on YouTube, the British parkour team Storror joined the film's production to choreograph and perform the parkour sequences in the film. They perform the stunts between skyscrapers and cranes, including some scenes on the Florence Cathedral. Principal photography wrapped on December 5, 2018. The film's production reportedly cost $150 million, making it one of the most expensive films made by Netflix at the time.

== Music ==
Lorne Balfe composed the film's score; he had previously worked with Michael Bay on 13 Hours. Milan Records released the film soundtrack on December 13, 2019.

=== Track listing ===
No.	Title	Length
1.	"Point of Extraction"	2:24
2.	"Ghosts"	3:19
3.	"Welcome to Florence"	3:53
4.	"Lose the Chopper"	1:55
5.	"Haunt the Living"	2:06
6.	"One Rule"	2:06
7.	"I Am the Danger"	3:16
8.	"You Can Change the World"	2:14
9.	"Thrones"	3:22
10.	"Memories"	1:58
11.	"Beautiful Sunday"	1:17
12.	"The Past"	0:51
13.	"Shit Ton of Blood"	2:34
14.	"Leave No Man Behind"	1:50
15.	"A Million Battles"	4:17
16.	"Day of the Dead"	4:08
17.	"Sabotage"	3:15
18.	"Live or Die"	1:56
19.	"One, But Not Done"	3:08
Total length:		49:49

== Release ==
The film premiered at The Shed arts center in New York City on December 10, 2019, and was released digitally to Netflix on December 13, 2019. On January 21, 2020, Netflix announced that the film had been viewed by over 83 million viewers on its service within its first month of release.

== Reception ==
=== Critical response ===
The review aggregator website Rotten Tomatoes reported an approval rating of 36% based on 94 reviews and an average rating of 4.8/10. The website's critical consensus reads "6 Underground is loud, frenetic and finally preposterous – which is either bad news or a hearty recommendation, depending how one feels about the movies of Michael Bay." Metacritic, another review aggregator, assigned the film a weighted average score of 41 out of 100 based on 22 critics, indicating "mixed or average" reviews.

Matt Singer of ScreenCrush gave the film 5 out of 10 and stated that it was "excessive, wanton, gorgeous, bizarre." Cary Darling of Houston Chronicle gave the film 1.5 out of 5 and stated, "6 Underground, a non-stop stunt reel with a few, admittedly impressive displays of [Bay's] usual visual verve, is just Fast & Furious crossed with an old Whitesnake music video, but with fewer functioning brain cells." Simon Abrams of TheWrap gave the film a negative review and stated, "It wouldn't be a Michael Bay movie if he didn't slavishly cater to the lowest common denominator (get ready for some sexist and gay-panic jokes!), so it makes sense that Bay's antiheroes are more obnoxious when they're trying to be good." Brian Tallerico of RogerEbert.com gave the film 2 out of 4 and stated that "it becomes repetitive, nonsensical, and just loud after everyone gets an origin story and we're left with nothing to do but go boom". Brian Lowry of CNN.com gave the film a negative review and stated, "6 Underground proves so uneven in its tone and unrelenting in its volume that it's hard to imagine a hole deep enough in which to bury its silliness." Mark Olsen of the Los Angeles Times gave the film a negative review and stated, "After a strong start the movie steadily declines, one set piece after another, and there are many moments where the mind wanders and then asks: 'Is this still going on?'" Matthew Monagle of the Austin Chronicle gave the film 2 out of 5 and stated, "6 Underground feels twice as disappointing for its early success."

Jesse Hassenger of The A.V. Club gave the film a "C" and stated, "What [director Michael Bay] seems to be chasing is the feeling of freedom, the windswept open-skies exhilaration of a man who has everything. But he's still just doing donuts, hoping all those whiplash turns from nihilism to macho sentiment awaken something inside him." Peter Bradshaw of Empire gave the film 2 out of 5 and said, "If you like your Bayhem pure and unfiltered, this one's for you. Others need not apply." David Fear of Rolling Stone gave the film 1.5 out of 5 and listed what he called the film's ingredients: "Guns. Ferraris... Parkour. Headshots. Mélanie Laurent. Las Vegas. Luxury yachts... Parisian Bartenders. Thong underwear... Incoherence. Xenophobia. Sexism. Auteurism (Vulgar). 'Merica." Karen Han of Polygon gave the film a negative review and stated, "What kills me most... is that amid all the cacophony, there's one joke that hints at the kind of joyful mayhem Bay is capable of." Wenlei Ma of News.com.au gave the film 1.5 out of 5 and stated, "6 Underground really is as terrible as you'd expect it to be, exactly the kind of brainless, bombastic and seizure-inducing fare Michael Bay is known for." Clarisse Loughrey of The Independent gave the film 2 out of 5 and described the film as "[letting] its audience gorge on violence and bravado, only to make us feel sick of the taste by the final reel". Roxana Hadadi of the entertainment blog Pajiba gave the film a negative review and stated, "Military idolatry and craven female objectification and a belief that the rich will save us? 6 Underground has it all!" Robert Levin of Newsday gave the film 1 out of 4 and called the film "a terrible action movie that utilizes Michael Bay's worst instincts and none of his best".

Not all reviews were negative. Glenn Kenny of the New York Times gave the film a positive review: "There are genuinely eccentric innovations here. There's certainly not a whole lot of recognizable humanity, but hey, that's why there's 'It's a Beautiful Day in the Neighborhood'." Barry Hertz of The Globe and Mail gave the film 3.5 out of 4 and stated the movie is "a riotous and gleefully delirious assault on the senses. It is vulgar. It is absurd. And it is completely enthralling." Nick Schager of The Daily Beast gave the film a positive review, stating, "For better and worse, in a multiplex or on your television or tablet, it delivers pleasure through pain." Adam Graham of The Detroit News gave the film a B and said, "The madman director's Netflix debut 6 Underground is so big it feels like it's going to smash out of your television screen."

=== Audience viewership ===
Netflix reported 6 Underground was watched by 83 million members over its first four weeks of release, among its best for an original title. But Pamela McClintock in The Hollywood Reporter notes changes in Netflix methodology made it difficult to compare viewership with other films on the streaming service. Updated hourly numbers from Netflix reports that the movie was watched for 205.47 million hours in the first 28 days of release.

== Cancelled sequel ==
On December 15, 2019, it was revealed that Netflix was already planning to create a franchise that would follow the adventures of the team introduced in the film. On December 18, 2019, due to the film's mixed reviews, those plans were put in doubt. On July 28, 2021, Netflix's film chief Scott Stuber confirmed that the film would not be getting a sequel, despite its success. He considered the film to be a failure: "We didn't feel like we got there on [6 Underground] creatively. It was a nice hit, but at the end of the day we didn't feel like we nailed the mark to justify coming back again. There just wasn't that deep love for those characters or that world."
