= Henry's Crime =

2010 film by Malcolm Venville

- British release poster
- Directed by: Malcolm Venville
- Screenplay by: Sacha Gervasi; David N. White
- Story by: Sacha Gervasi; Stephen Hamel
- Produced by: Keanu Reeves; Stephen Hamel; Jordan Schur; David Mimran; Lemore Syvan
- Starring: Keanu Reeves; Vera Farmiga; James Caan
- Cinematography: Paul Cameron
- Edited by: Curtis Clayton
- Music by: Blake Leyh
- Production companies: Company Films; Mimran Schur Pictures
- Distributed by: Moving Pictures Film and Television; Maitland Primrose Group
- Release dates: September 14, 2010 (TIFF); April 8, 2011 (United States)
- Running time: 108 minutes
- Country: United States
- Language: English
- Budget: $12 million
- Box office: $2.1 million

Henry's Crime is a 2010 American romantic comedy crime film directed by Malcolm Venville and starring Keanu Reeves, Vera Farmiga, and James Caan. The film follows Henry (Reeves), who goes to jail for a bank robbery he did not commit. Once released, he plans to rob the same bank with his former cellmate Max (Caan). The film premiered at the Toronto International Film Festival on September 14, 2010, and was given a limited release in the United States on April 8, 2011.

== Plot ==
Working as a toll collector on a lonely highway in Buffalo, New York, Henry is a man seemingly without ambition, dreams or purpose; a man sleepwalking his way through life. His wife Debbie is not happy with the situation.

One morning Eddie, a friend, drops by to ask Henry to join a baseball game. As they drive to the game in Henry's car, Eddie asks Henry to stop at an ATM. But Eddie, and two acquaintances also in the car, instead rob the Buffalo Savings Bank, and Henry is arrested as an accomplice.

Rather than give up the names of the culprits, Henry takes the fall and goes to jail. His cellmate is the irrepressible Max, a conman who has grown comfortable with the familiarity and security of his "idyllic" life behind bars, but who also helps plant an idea in Henry's mind that will change his life: for a man to find his purpose, he must first have a dream. Debbie divorces Henry and marries Joe, one of the men who carried out the robbery.

Upon his release 18 months later, Henry finds his purpose. Having done his time, he decides he might as well do the crime. Discovering a long-forgotten bootlegger's tunnel that runs from the bank to a theater across the alleyway, he convinces the reluctant Max to file for his long-overdue parole – to help stage a robbery of the bank.

Henry becomes an actor in the theater's production of Anton Chekhov's 1904 play The Cherry Orchard, while Max "volunteers" to work in the theater. Henry finds himself falling for the production's mercurial leading lady, Julie.

Debbie's husband Joe is recruited to help clear the tunnel of mud; he informs Eddie, who insists on participating. During the robbery, Eddie tries to take all the money himself, but is overpowered by Max and is left in the vault. As the three escape, Henry tells Joe to stop the car, wishes Max well, and returns to Julie.

== Cast ==
- Keanu Reeves as Henry Torne
- James Caan as Max Saltzman
- Vera Farmiga as Julie Ivanova
- Judy Greer as Debbie Torne
- Fisher Stevens as Eddie Vibes
- Peter Stormare as Darek Millodragovic
- Bill Duke as Frank
- Danny Hoch as Joe
- Currie Graham as Simon
- David Costabile as Arnold

== Production ==
=== Development ===
Malcolm Venville directed the film from a screenplay written by Sacha Gervasi and David N. White. The screenplay was adapted from a story by Gervasi and Stephen Hamel. Hamel produced the picture alongside Jordan Schur and David Mimran through their company Mimran Schur Pictures, and Lemore Syvan and Keanu Reeves through the production company Films.

=== Casting ===
In August 2009, it was announced that Keanu Reeves had joined the cast and would be producing the project. In October 2009, Variety reported that Vera Farmiga and James Caan had also joined the project in main roles.

=== Filming ===
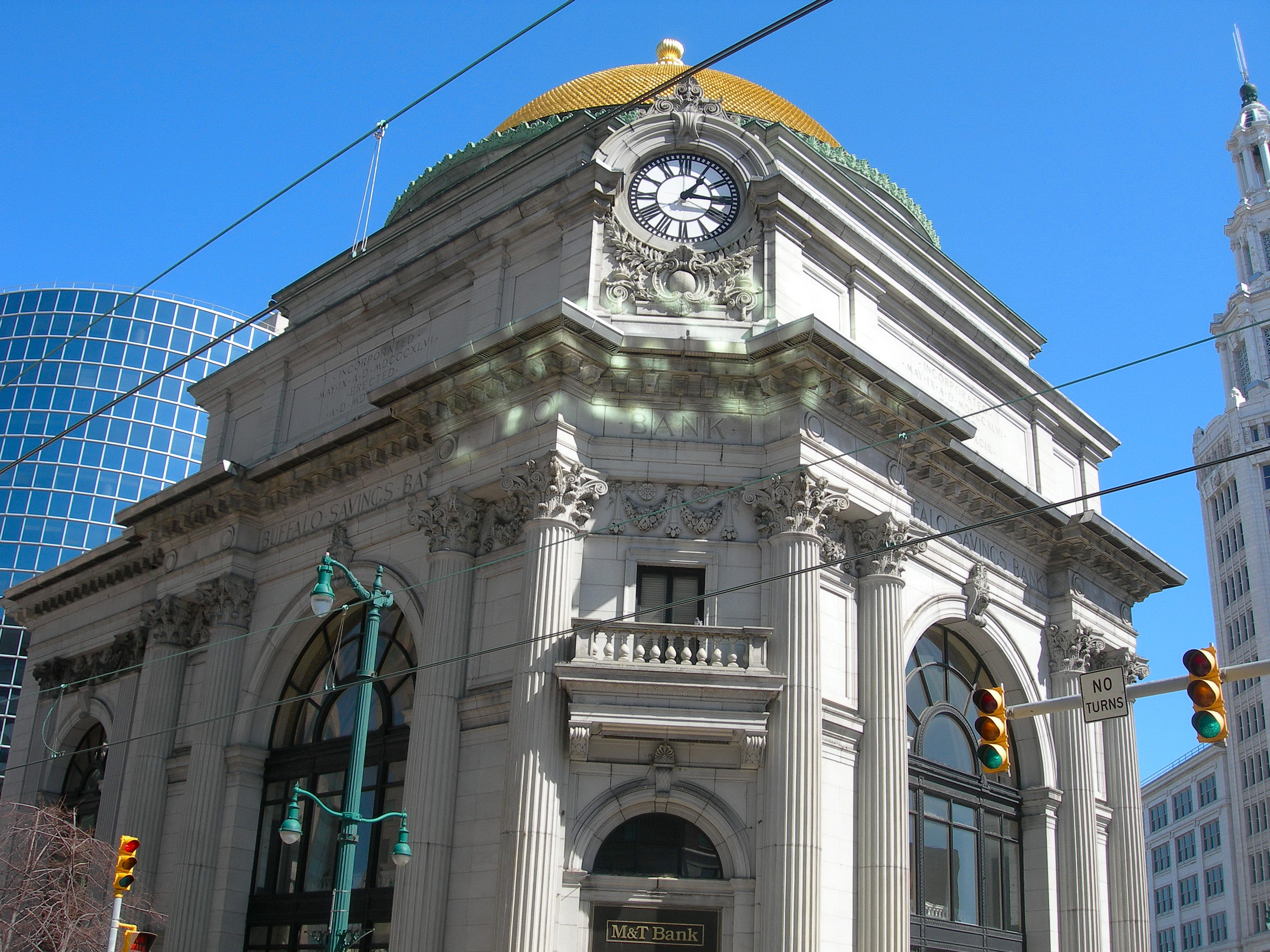
Bank of Buffalo

Principal photography for the project took place in Buffalo, New York, Queens, New York City, and Tarrytown, New York. Production started in December 2009 and was completed in January 2010. Filming also took place in Nassau County Corrections Facility in East Meadow, New York.

== Release ==
=== Box office ===
Henry's Crime ranked #75 in its opening weekend taking $8,726 from two theaters. The film went on to make $102,541 in the United States and $2,062,820 in foreign markets, for a worldwide total gross of $2,165,361.

=== Critical response ===
The film received mixed reviews from film critics. As of June 2025, Henry's Crime holds a 43% approval rating on Rotten Tomatoes, based on 54 reviews with an average score of 5.07 out of 10. The site's critical consensus reads, "Supporting actors Vera Farmiga and James Caan give the movie a little heft, but Henry's Crime is an otherwise predictable heist/comedy with slow pacing." On Metacritic, the film has a score of 49 out of 100, based on 19 critics, indicating "mixed or average" reviews.

Lisa Schwarzbaum of Entertainment Weekly gave the film a C grade, and wrote, "This picaresque caper might do well as a novel, but as a movie – assembled with no consistent sense of moviemaking, each performer left to his or her own actorly whims – it's a grab bag of comic clichés about bank robberies and regional theater." Film critic Roger Ebert wrote, "Reeves has many arrows in his quiver, but screwball comedy isn't one of them. Vera Farmiga, James Caan and Fisher Stevens can do it, but they often seem to be looking back, waiting for Reeves to pass the baton. What's needed is someone nervous to play Henry. A Steve Buscemi for example. Reeves maintains a sort of Zen detachment. Whatever happens is all right with him."
