= The Reddings =

American funk/soul/disco band

Reddings
- Origin: Macon, Georgia, U.S.
- Genres: Funk, R&B, soul
- Years active: 1980–1988
- Labels: Believe In A Dream Records (division of CBS Records); Polydor Records
- Past members: Dexter Redding; Otis Redding III; Mark Lockett

The Reddings were an American funk, soul and disco band, founded by Otis Redding's sons Dexter (bass and vocals) and Otis Redding III (December 17, 1963 – April 18, 2023 age 59; guitar) together with Mark Lockett (drums, keyboards, and lead vocal). Their most well-known songs include "Remote Control", "The Awakening" (1980); "Doin' it", "Funkin on the One", "Class (Is What You Got)" (1981); a cover of Dexter and Otis' father's "Sittin' on the Dock of the Bay" (1982); and "Hand Dance" (1983).

== History ==
In 1979 to 1980, Dexter, Otis III, and Mark recorded their first album, The Awakening, with producers Russell Timmons and Nick Mann at the Believe in a Dream studio, which was located in downtown Washington, D.C. In December 1980, a single from the album, "Remote Control," went to #6 on the Billboard Hot Soul Singles chart, and peaked at #89 on the Billboard Hot 100. Written by Nick Mann, Bill Beard, and Chet Fortune of the Washington, D.C.–based songwriting team of Last Colony Music, the tune was also sampled in an episode of the 1980s television programme, WKRP in Cincinnati. "Remote Control" continues to receive airplay in countries including Belgium, France, Italy, and the Netherlands. In addition, the album's title track, "The Awakening" received significant airplay. A bass-drums-duet, this song is often covered live by Les Claypool (Primus) and on his album Highball with the Devil.

The Reddings continued to release albums throughout the 1980s, scoring other minor hits on the charts.

Their sixth and final album, The Reddings was released on November 26, 1988, reaching a peak position of #88 on the US Billboard album chart. It featured a hit single "Call The Law," which reached peak position of #16 on the Billboard Hot Black Singles Chart on November 26, 1988.

On April 18, 2023, Otis Redding III died of cancer at the age of 59.

== Discography ==
- The Awakening (1980)
- Class (1981)
- Steamin' Hot (1982)
- Back To Basics (1983)
- If Looks Could Kill (1985)
- The Reddings (1988)
