= FDR (miniseries) =

Television miniseries

- Promotional poster
- Genre: Historical drama
- Directed by: Malcolm Venville
- Starring: Christian McKay; Rufus Jones; Alice Bounsall; Adrian Galley
- Country of origin: United States
- Original language: English
- No. of episodes: 3

Production
- Executive producers: Bradley Cooper; Doris Kearns Goodwin
- Production companies: RadicalMedia; GroupM Motion Entertainment

Original release
- Network: History Channel
- Release: May 29 – May 31, 2023

FDR is a 2023 American miniseries. The three-part miniseries chronicles the life of Franklin D. Roosevelt, the thirty-second President of the United States and premiered on May 29, 2023, on History.

== Cast ==
- Christian McKay as Franklin D. Roosevelt
- Rufus Jones as Theodore Roosevelt
- Alice Bounsall as Eleanor Roosevelt
- Adrian Galley as Winston Churchill

== Episodes ==
No.	Title	Directed by	Written by	Original release date	U.S. viewers (millions)
1	"Nothing to Fear"	Malcolm Venville	Rebecca Sue Haber & Frederick Rendina	May 29, 2023	N/A
2	"Rendezvous with Destiny"	Malcolm Venville	David Aguilar & Frederick Rendina	May 30, 2023	N/A
3	"Arsenal of Democracy"	Malcolm Venville	David Aguilar & Frederick Rendina	May 31, 2023	N/A

== See also ==
- Washington (2020 History Channel miniseries)
- Grant (2020 History Channel miniseries)
- Abraham Lincoln (2022 History Channel miniseries)
- Theodore Roosevelt (2022 History Channel miniseries)
- Kennedy (2023 History Channel miniseries)
- Thomas Jefferson (2025 History Channel miniseries)
