= Malcolm Venville =

British photographer and film director

Malcolm Frank Venville (born 1962) is a British photographer and film director.

== Life and career ==
Born in Birmingham, Venville was a hearing child to deaf parents. He was, in the words of his uncle, "caught in some no-man's land between the deaf world and the hearing world". He attended Solihull College (1981–83) and Polytechnic of Central London (1983–86), graduating with honors with a BA in film, video, and photographic arts.

After working as an assistant, Venville began producing images. After winning awards with The Association Of Photographers, he became a sought-after advertising photographer. His first print work was the "Be more than just a number" campaign for the advertising agency Simons Palmer Denton for Wrangler. This was followed by print campaigns for Wieden and Kennedy, Bartle Bogle Hegarty and BBDO.

Venville began directing award winning commercials, most notably was the Volkswagen "Squares" project for the agency Arnolds. This spot was the most world's most awarded TV commercial of 2003 winning a Golden Lion at Cannes, a Clio, a Grandy at the ANDY Awards, an AICP's Award of Overall Excellence and an Emmy nomination. Venville has published three books of photography. Layers (Westzone 2001) is a monograph of Venville's advertising and personal photography. Lucha Loco (Therapy 2006) is a collection of over a hundred portraits of Lucha Libre wrestlers taken in Mexico City. The Women of Casa X (Schilt Publishing 2013) is a series of portraits and interviews with sex workers housed in Casa Xochiquetzal, a shelter primarily for elderly sex workers, in the Tepito district of Mexico City.

Venville's film career began with the award winning Silent Film (BBC/Channel 4. 1997), a short film about his profoundly deaf parents. This was followed with short documentary films; Remembering Sister Ruth (BBC 1997), that features Kathleen Byron discussing her role as Sister Ruth in Black Narcissus, and Remembering Miss Torso (2004) about Georgine Darcy, who played the ballet dancer "Miss Torso" in Rear Window (Therapy Films 2003). Venville directed the short Zillions (Nowness 2013) featuring Karl Lagerfeld which won best documentary at The International Fashion Film Festival.

Venville's feature film debut was 44 Inch Chest (Anonymous Content 2009), which won the Jury Prize at Seville Film Festival and the San Diego Film Critics Society Awards for best Ensemble. This was followed by another independent feature Henry's Crime (2010), which he filmed in New York City and Buffalo.

In 2019, A&E aired a mini series directed by Venville based on Ron Chernow's biography of Ulysses Grant. Justin Salinger played Grant (Radical Media). This was followed by the mini series, Abraham Lincoln (2022) featuring Graham Sibley as Abraham Lincoln. This show was executive produced by Doris Kearns Goodwin and based on her book, Leadership In Turbulent Times. Venville continued his collaboration with Kearns Goodwin, Radical Media and A&E with Theodore Roosevelt (2022).

== Filmography ==
Short film

- Remembering Sister Ruth (1997)
- Silent Film (1998)
- That Certain Something (1999)
- Zillions (2013)
- Philophiles (2014)
- Portrait of a Dancer: Sarah Lamb (2015)

Feature film

- 44 Inch Chest (2009)
- Henry's Crime (2010)
- And We Go Green (2019)
- Iron Maiden: Burning Ambition (2026)

Miniseries

- Grant (2020)
- Abraham Lincoln (2022)
- Theodore Roosevelt (2022)

== Bibliography ==
- Layers (2003)
- Lucha Loco (2006)
- The Women of Casa X (2013)
