= We Are Storror =

2025 documentary film

- Directed by: Michael Bay
- Written by: Rich Eckersley
- Produced by: Michael Bay; Angus Wall; Paris Kassidokostas-Latsis; Terry Dougas; Drew Taylor
- Starring: Josh Burnett-Blake; Benj Cave; Max Cave; Callum Powell; Sacha Powell; Toby Segar; Drew Taylor
- Cinematography: Storror
- Edited by: Michael Engelken; Jan Supa
- Music by: Lorne Balfe
- Production companies: Rhea Films; Bay Films; Hercules Film Fund; MakeMake
- Release date: March 8, 2025 (SXSW)
- Running time: 95 minutes
- Country: United States
- Language: English

We Are Storror is a 2025 American documentary film about Storror, a group of British parkour and freerunning athletes. The film is produced and directed by Michael Bay and it is his first documentary. It premiered at the 2025 South by Southwest Film & TV Festival.

== Reception ==
On the review aggregator website Rotten Tomatoes, 90% of 10 critics' reviews are positive, with an average rating of 7.1/10.

Frank Scheck of The Hollywood Reporter wrote, "The photography — employing color, black & white and slow-motion — is consistently breathtaking, from the drones that capture precisely synchronized movements from high above to the GoPro cameras, often worn by the team members themselves, that immerse you fully in the experiences."

Peter Debruge of Variety wrote, "Since Storror's greatest stunts are easily watched online, the hook here is to give audiences a behind-the-scenes look at four ambitious new challenges: dashing down the zig-zag stairs of Portugal's Varossa Dam, turning an abandoned Bulgarian holiday resort (the Costa Del Croco) into their personal jungle gym, scaling balconies and sprinting across roofs in Malta, before wrapping things up in a giant sand quarry back home in England. They're all visually stunning locations that pose separate risks, though the doc makes clear just how much prep goes into each performance."

Christian Zilko of IndieWire gave the film a B and wrote that it "is a compelling document of a friendship that has shaped seven lives for the better and left them in the enviable position of being able to honestly say their deepest desire is for everything to remain the same."
