= Garrett Fisher =

American composer based in Seattle

Garrett Fisher (born 1970) is an American composer based in Seattle.

== Works ==
- "The Passion of Saint Thomas More" (1995) recorded BIS Records
- "Moon in the Bucket," based on a 14th-century Noh play, Matsukaze
- "Stargazer," based on the life of Galileo
- "Dream of Zeus"
- "Silk Road"
- "Psyche," based on the Greek myth 2008
- "The Passion of Saint Sebastian"
- "At the Hawk's Well"
