= James Seaton (professor) =

American academic

James Everett Seaton (1944 – March 30, 2017) was an American writer, professor and literary critic. He argued for the continued relevance and importance of the tradition of literary humanism championed by Matthew Arnold and later, Irving Babbitt and Paul Elmer Moore. At the same time he opposed many of the dominant trends in Academia regarding literary criticism and the teaching of literature, such as the Cultural Studies model instituted by Stuart Hall and the general emphasis away from the study of literary works themselves in favor of a focus on critical theory.

== Biography ==
James Seaton was born in Iowa, received B.A. from the University of Illinois at Urbana, and earned a Ph.D. in English and Comparative Literature with a major in Greek and Latin from the University of Iowa. He was a professor in the Department of English at Michigan State University, where he taught from 1971 until his passing. Seaton was married to playwright Sandra Seaton.

James Seaton wrote or edited five books. He was a regular contributor to The Weekly Standard, and his essays and reviews have also appeared in The Wall Street Journal, The Hudson Review, The American Scholar (magazine), Yale Journal of Law and Humanities, First Things, Modern Age, The University Bookman, The Review of Metaphysics and The Journal of the History of Ideas and many other academic and non-academic publications.

== Literary criticism ==
Among Seaton's central contentions were that literary criticism and instruction should prioritize literature over theory, a position he had opportunity to express during C-Span's Teaching Literature conference marking the 10th anniversary of Allan Bloom's The Closing of the American Mind, held at the University of Chicago. In his closing statements of that address, Dr. Seaton predicted that the Humanistic Tradition would survive so long as "novels, plays, poems and even intellectual biographies such as The Closing of the American Mind continue to exert their hold on us, through the postmodern era and beyond" because "its only necessary ground is the authority and significance of literature." In his 2014 book, Literary Criticism from Plato to Postmodernism: The Humanistic Alternative, he presented the notion that the history of literary criticism could be broadly conceived of as a conversation between three distinct but at times overlapping traditions, the Platonic tradition which judged literature by the extent to which it conveyed the proper political messages, the Neoplatonic which romanticized literature as a gateway to transcendent knowledge and the Humanistic tradition, which valued literature for its potential to offer insight into the human experience. In his favorable review of the book for The Wall Street Journal, Barton Swaim referred to the book as an "eloquent complaint."

== Articles written by Seaton ==
=== Books written or edited by Seaton ===
- Literary Criticism from Plato to Postmodernism: The Humanistic Alternative by James Seaton. Cambridge University Press, 2014.
- The Genteel Tradition in American Philosophy and Character and Opinion in the United States by George Santayana. Edited and with an introduction by James Seaton, with essays by James Seaton, Wilfred McClay, John Lachs, and Roger Kimball. New Haven, Connecticut: Yale University Press, 2009.
- Cultural Conservatism, Political Liberalism: From Criticism to Cultural Studies. Ann Arbor: University of Michigan Press, 1996.
- Beyond Cheering and Bashing: New Perspectives on The Closing of the American Mind. Edited by William K. Buckley and James Seaton. Bowling Green, Ohio: Bowling Green SU Popular Press, 1992.
- A Reading of Vergil's Georgics. Amsterdam: Hakkert, 1983.

=== Seaton's contributions to books ===
- Introduction to Santayana Edition volume of Three Philosophical Poets from MIT Press, 2019
- “George Santayana as a Cultural Critic.” Under Any Sky: Contemporary Readings of George Santayana. Ed. Matthew Caleb Flamm and Krzysztof Piotr Skowroňski. Newcastle, UK: Cambridge Scholars Publishing, 2007. 111-20.
- “Affirming the Principle.” Ralph Ellison and the Raft of Hope: A Political Companion to Invisible Man. Ed. Lucas E. Morel. Lexington, Kentucky: UP of Kentucky, 2004. 22-36.
- “Henry James's The Princess Casamassima: Revolution and the Preservation of Culture.” The Moral of the Story: Literature and Public Ethics. ed. Henry T. Edmondson III. Lanham, Maryland: Lexington Books, 2000. 15-25.
- "The Beauty of Middle‑Class Virtue: Willa Cather’s O Pioneers! The Moral of the Story: Literature and Public Ethics. ed. Henry T. Edmondson III. Lanham, Maryland: Lexington Books, 2000. 193-202.
- Noe, Marcia (1993). "Afterword: Midwestern Muckrakers". Exploring the Midwestern Literary Imagination: Essays in Honor of David D. Anderson. Whitston Publishing Company. pp. 203–208 – via Questia.
- "The Humanities and Cultural Criticism: The Example of Ralph Ellison." Rejuvenating the Humanities. Ed. Ray Browne and Marshall Fishwick. Bowling Green: Bowling Green SU popular P, 1992. 101-108.
- "Innocence Regained; the Career of Leslie Fiedler." Politics and the Muse: Studies in the Politics of Recent American Literature Ed. Adam J. Sorkin. Bowling Green: Bowling Green SU Popular P, 1989. 93-110.
