= Washington (miniseries) =

Television miniseries

- Promotional poster
- Genre: Docudrama; War drama History
- Created by: Matthew Ginsburg
- Written by: Kristen Burns
- Directed by: Roel Reiné
- Starring: Nicholas Rowe; James Robinson; Nicholas Audsley; Nia Roberts
- Narrated by: Jeff Daniels
- Theme music composer: Stephen Phillips
- Country of origin: United States
- Original language: English
- No. of episodes: 3

Production
- Producers: Doris Kearns Goodwin; Beth Laski
- Production location: Bucharest, Romania
- Cinematography: Rolf Dekens
- Editors: Alex Durham; Wes Lipman

Original release
- Network: History
- Release: February 16 – February 18, 2020

Washington is a 2020 American television miniseries directed by Roel Reiné. The three-part miniseries, which premiered on February 16, 2020 on History Channel, chronicles the life of George Washington, a Founding Father and the first President of the United States.

== Cast ==
- Nicholas Rowe as George Washington
- James Robinson as Alexander Hamilton
- Nicholas Audsley as Thomas Jefferson
- Nia Roberts as Martha Washington
- Hainsley Lloyd Bennett as William 'Billy' Lee
- Josh Taylor as Henry Knox
- Ciarán Owens as Benedict Arnold
- Dan Ursu as Jumonville
- Shawn Beaver-Hawman as The Half-King
- Radu Andrei Micu as Nathanael Greene
- Daniel Crossley as James Madison
- Frank Lammers as John Adams
- Jeremy Berges as Marquis de Lafayette
- Kieron Jecchinis as Horatio Gates
- Colin Mace as General William Howe
- James Carroll Jordan as General Charles Cornwallis
- Noah Bloemendaal as John Washington

== Episodes ==
No.	Title	Directed by	Written by	Original release date	U.S. viewers (millions)
1	"Loyal Subject"	Roel Reiné (scripted scenes) and Matthew Ginsburg (documentary material)	Matthew Ginsburg and Jeremiah Murphy	February 16, 2020	2.61
In 1754, American colonist George Washington is an ambitious young officer of the Virginia regiment for the British Army. He is sent to the Ohio Country to deliver an ultimatum to the French Army camped near the border of the Iroquois nation. However, Half-King takes advantage of his inexperience and attacks the French soldiers, inadvertently starting the French and Indian War. With a defeat at Fort Necessity and the chaos in the Battle of the Monongahela, Washington redeems himself by creating the first American regiment. After Lord Loudoun uses Washington's strategy to attack Fort Duquesne, putting an end to the war, he resigns. He marries widow Martha and returns to Mount Vernon to be a farmer. Then, in 1763, the British issue a proclamation to ban buying land in the west, thus begins a decade-long crackdown on colonists ambitions. This kicks off with a slew of new taxes on all goods, starting with the Stamp Act. As Americans are killed in the Boston Massacre, people in other colonies take notice, including Washington who becomes a reluctant revolutionary. When this young country is on the verge of collapse in 1775, Washington is called upon to lead the Continental Army as the commander-in-chief, but it won't be an easy task.
2	"Rebel Commander"	Roel Reiné (scripted scenes) and Matthew Ginsburg (documentary material)	Matthew Ginsburg and Jeremiah Murphy	February 17, 2020	2.14
In 1776, Washington's Continental Army, a bunch of undisciplined rag-tag soldiers is getting ready for a war with the British Empire. After marching to north with his untested army, Washington soon realizes that he was given an impossible task. With his eager team of patriot officers, Henry Knox, Nathanael Greene, and Alexander Hamilton, Washington sees the largest military force he's ever faced. At the same time General Howe's British fleet of warships sail into the harbor, the Declaration of Independence is drafted which will unite all colonists to the cause. In the first major battle of the war, Washington's army gets crushed during the Battle of Long Island and he plans an audacious escape in the night. After losing Manhattan, he moves into New Jersey with 6,000 remaining soldiers. In a snowstorm, he plans a symbolic offensive by Crossing the Delaware River in the dead of night and attacks the Hessian mercenaries holding an outpost in Trenton. As the British cripples congress in the capital of Philadelphia, there's rumblings that Horatio Gates be in charge. In 1777, at the Battle of Saratoga, major general Benedict Arnold is seriously wounded but becomes a hero. French ally Marquis de Lafayette comes to help Washington and later, Benjamin Franklin convinces France to an alliance. In the winter, the army battles a ration shortage at Valley Forge, but Washington writes to the people for help. After not getting compensated, a jaded Arnold, defects to the enemy.
3	"Father of His Country"	Roel Reiné (scripted scenes) and Matthew Ginsburg (documentary material)	Matthew Ginsburg and Jeremiah Murphy	February 18, 2020	2.01
In 1781, the Revolution War has gone on for six years. At the forefront is Brigadier General Arnold who took down the Continental Army with his act of betrayal. Washington orders a manhunt to capture the turncoat, but he escapes to England. After years of fighting without pay, soldiers form a mutiny, but Washington quickly squashes it and saves his army. In order to end the war, he plans an all-out assault on General Cornwallis' Virginia camp with the help of the French fleet and a constant bombardment of cannon fire on Yorktown. The British surrender and agree to a peace treaty two years later. With the Revolution won, Washington, now 57-years-old, is nominated to run this new country as the first president of the United States. He appoints James Madison, Thomas Jefferson and his most trusted allies, Knox and Hamilton. He and his advisors invent the government branches, the Bill of Rights, and start building Washington, D.C. However, not everyone agrees and uprisings threaten from within. Washington not only has to end this treachery, he has to keep a fragile country together when he is elected to his second term. He puts on his uniform once more to disperse a rebellion who disagrees with his polices. In 1797, Washington hands over the presidency to John Adams and goes back home. Two years into retirement, he catches a throat disease and passes away; he was 67. An age of history dies along with him, but his legacy will never be forgotten.

== See also ==
- George Washington (1984 miniseries)
- George Washington II: The Forging of a Nation (1986 miniseries)
- We Fight to Be Free (2006 film)
- Cultural depictions of George Washington
- List of television series and miniseries about the American Revolution
- List of films about the American Revolution
- Grant (2020 History Channel miniseries)
- Abraham Lincoln (2022 History Channel miniseries)
- Theodore Roosevelt (2022 History Channel miniseries)
- FDR (2023 History Channel miniseries)
- Kennedy (2023 History Channel miniseries)
- Thomas Jefferson (2025 History Channel miniseries)
