= Remote Control (The Reddings song) =

Single by The Reddings

from the album The Awakening
- B-side: "The Awakening"
- Released: 1980
- Genre: Soul
- Length: 5:16 (Album version); 3:58 (7" version)
- Songwriter(s): Nick Mann, Bill Beard, Chet Fortune

"Remote Control" is a 1980, debut single by The Reddings. The song was written by Nick Mann, Bill Beard and Chet Fortune and appeared on their album, The Awakening. It was the group's most successful hit on the soul chart peaking at number six and one of two entries on the Hot 100 peaking at number eighty-nine. "Remote Control" was the group's most successful entry on the dance charts where the song peaked at number twenty-two.
