= Monika Chiang =

American fashion designer and businesswoman

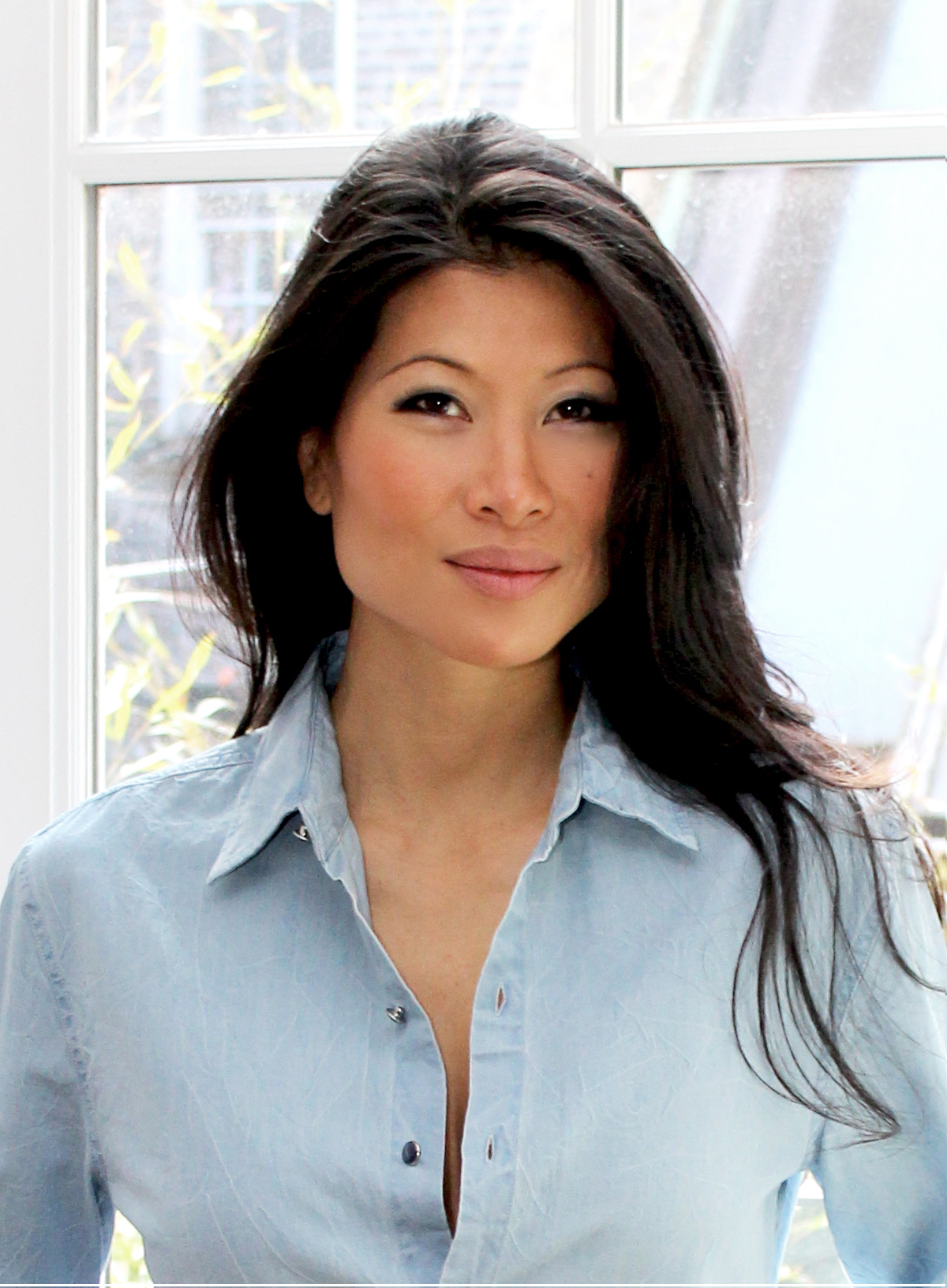
- Born: May 22, 1974 (age 52); New York City
- Occupation: Fashion Designer
- Label: Monika Chiang
- Website: monikachiang.com

Monika Chiang (born May 22, 1974) is an American fashion designer and businesswoman based in New York City.

== Double Seven ==
Chiang founded the lounge Double Seven in New York City's meatpacking district with restaurateur Jeffrey Jah and David Rabin in the summer of 2005, and served as its managing partner. The restaurant's drink selection featured cocktails developed by Chiang that were covered by media outlets including PBS, the New York Times, and the Toronto Star. The restaurant moved locations in July 2007.

== Fashion line ==
In 2011, Chiang began an eponymously named fashion collection, which included apparel, handbags, shoes, lingerie and jewellery. The Los Angeles Times described the line as "an ode to romance in seaside pales". That year Chiang opened her first boutique in Los Angeles on Robertson Boulevard in West Hollywood. The official opening was on October 10, 2011, and was attended by film actresses and other celebrities. In November 2011 Chiang launched a pop-up shop in the SoHo neighbourhood of New York City, near the intersection of Prince Street and West Broadway. Chiang presented her first full collection as part of the Fall 2012 Mercedes-Benz Fashion Week at Lincoln Center in New York City on February 10, 2012. That same month her designs were featured in Vogue Magazine. Chiang next opened a flagship store in New York's SoHo district in April 2012. In June 2012 Marie Claire magazine called Chiang "one to watch" after her first year of designing.

On September 6, 2012, Chiang presented her first spring line as a part of Spring 2013 Mercedes-Benz Fashion Week, with a show at The Box at the Lincoln Center for the Performing Arts. The full line was covered by publications including Forbes Magazine, and New York Magazine. On December 4, 2012, Chiang's New York boutique was featured on the television show Million Dollar Decorators, showing the redesign of Chiang's store provided by interior designer Mary McDonald.

In 2013 Chiang showed her second fall/winter line at New York Fashion Week. That year she was named by Harper's Bazaar as one of the world's 17 most promising accessories designers.

Overall, her style has been described by New York Magazine as designs "which have a chic, rock-and-roll twist and fuse both masculine and feminine styles". She has stated that she only creates clothing that she would wear herself.
