= Thomas Jefferson (miniseries) =

Television miniseries

- Promotional poster
- Genre: Historical drama
- Directed by: Jon Hirsch
- Narrated by: Devin E. Haqq
- Country of origin: United States
- Original language: English
- No. of episodes: 6

Production
- Executive producers: Nancy Glass; Jon Hirsch
- Production location: Pennsylvania
- Cinematography: Matthew Joffe
- Editors: Pat Quinn; Travis Greene; Justin Mooning; Drew Wallace
- Running time: 60 minutes (each episode)
- Production companies: Glass Entertainment Group; GroupM Motion Entertainment

Original release
- Network: History Channel
- Release: February 17 – February 19, 2025

Thomas Jefferson is a 2025 American television documentary miniseries. The six-part miniseries chronicles the life of Thomas Jefferson, a Founding Father and third President of the United States, and premiered on the History Channel on February 17, 2025.

== Episodes ==
No.	Title	Directed by	Original release date	U.S. viewers (millions)
1	"A Revolutionary is Born (1743-1773)"	Jon Hirsch	February 17, 2025	N/A
Born into one of the most powerful first families of Virginia in 1743, Thomas Jefferson grows up in an unrecognizable America as we see today. From his upbringing at Shadwell plantation with enslaved people serving him to becoming a patriarch as a teen, left to run Tuckahoe plantation after his father died. In his twenties, as Jefferson attends William & Mary to study law, he starts to learn about The Enlightenment way of thinking. He serves in the House of Burgesses and writes about emancipation, advocating the end of slavery. However, when he marries a wealthy slave owner's daughter, Martha Wayles, he inherits her late father's property and enslaved family, the Hemings, including Sally who bore six of his children. After getting settled at a work-in-progress Monticello, the colonies become restless after the Stamp Tax Act comes into law for funding England's war effort overseas. Like-minded colonists form the Sons of Liberty and are responsible for the Boston Tea Party. Jefferson and elitists stand in solidarity, forming their own resistance for independence of British rule.
2	"Independence (1774-1776)"	Jon Hirsch	February 17, 2025	N/A
It is a confusing time for colonists; they either continue living under British tyranny or rebel against it, becoming traitors. The Continental Congress is born, and they have their first meeting secretly in Philadelphia's state house. However, a 31-year-old Thomas Jefferson isn't invited...yet. He then writes A Summary View of the Rights of British America in 1774 and gets noticed. He becomes a delegate in the second meeting and meets John Adams and Benjamin Franklin who both entrust him as the best writer among the Committee of Five to draft the Declaration of Independence. In his initial draft, Jefferson blames King George III for bringing slavery to the colonies, but this is ultimately edited out of his draft by the Congress. When the Royal Governor of Virginia tries to persuade the enslaved to fight on the King's side with his Dunmore's Proclamation promising their freedom, it becomes clear that a war for independence is inevitable.
3	"Jefferson at War (1777-1784)"	Jon Hirsch	February 18, 2025	N/A
As General George Washington leads rag-tag Colonial militias into battle against the mighty British Army, Jefferson takes a statesman civilian role. He drafts laws reforming the government by separating church and state with help from James Madison. When Jefferson is sworn in as the governor of the commonwealth of Virginia, the American Revolutionary War raging up north finally arrives on his doorstep. Instead of protecting the capital as traitor Benedict Arnold and his dragoons move in, he goes back to Monticello. Jefferson, an intellectual with no military experience, flees with his family, bringing much ridicule from the public. After more than three weeks of intense fighting at the Battle of Yorktown, General Cornwallis and his troops surrender, and the war is over. Jefferson returns to his home of slave-labor and writes his first book, Notes on the State of Virginia of his views and beliefs on Native Americans and black people. He also spends time with his wife, however, it's short-lived as Martha dies shortly after her sixth pregnancy. After going into a deep depression, his peers send him to France as a diplomat.
4	"Jefferson in Paris (1784-1793)"	Jon Hirsch	February 18, 2025	N/A
After John Jay, Benjamin Franklin, and John Adams sign the Treaty of Paris, an agreement that officially ends the Revolutionary War, Jefferson arrives at the court of Louis XVI and Marie Antoinette, and finds that within all of the opulence and glamour of Paris is an underlying tone yearning for another revolution. Back in the United States, George Washington is elected the country's first president. Jefferson plays an indirect role in constructing the U.S. Constitution and offers advice on James Madison's drafts. Missing Maria, his youngest daughter, Jefferson and his eldest daughter, Martha, welcome her and the young maid and Jefferson's sister-in-law Sally Hemings, who he conceals as a slave (slavery is outlawed in Paris) and as his mistress. Instead of professing her freedom, Sally goes back to Monticello with Jefferson as she is pregnant with his child, and the French monarchy is in crisis. Washington begs Jefferson to serve as his secretary of state, and he meets at the new state capital in New York City alongside his soon-to-be-rival, war hero Alexander Hamilton. They continue to clash and form two political parties; supporters of Hamilton become known as Federalists for a centralized government with Britain, while Jefferson forms the Democratic Republican Party supporting state's constitutional rights and an alliance with France. But the political independent, Washington, starts his second term and focuses on building the United States' economic and military strength.
5	"President Jefferson (1793-1809)"	Jon Hirsch	February 19, 2025	N/A
As the country falls deeper into political divide, Jefferson resigns and again retires to Monticello. However, he maintains his network of allies and runs for president in the first partisan election against his friend John Adams, who wins, and Jefferson becomes his vice president. Rather than see the Federalist agenda, he prepares for the election of 1800 after the press reports on the administration's tyranny. As Jefferson appeals to the common people, he is elected as the third president of the United States at the age of 57, and the first to be inaugurated in Washington, D.C. In his first term as president, he establishes America's first military academy, West Point, and lets the unconstitutional Alien & Sedition Acts expire. His personal life is up for scrutiny when the press prints allegations on the mixed-raced relationship with his mistress. The scandal does not sink him, and Jefferson dominates headlines when he purchases the Louisiana territory from Napoleon Bonaparte, who is in need of cash to fund his war campaign. Jefferson then sends Meriwether Lewis and William Clark on an expedition to explore the land and interact with indigenous people. In order to expand westward, the government establishes trading posts, and when the tribes run out of things to trade they must pay with their land. In 1807, the HMS Leopard attacks an American ship, the USS Chesapeake, and Jefferson imposes an embargo which weakens the economy. He abandons the United States' involvement with the transatlantic slave trade. With domestic slaves being more profitable, this will also make him richer after he leaves office.
6	"Jefferson's Legacy (1809-1826)"	Jon Hirsch	February 19, 2025	N/A
As his second term comes to a close over 17 thriving states, Jefferson returns to his beloved home and eldest daughter (his daughter Maria had died) and nine grandchildren. His four mixed-race children with Sally who became carpenters were freed, as promised, at the age if 21. Jefferson becomes obsessed with fine furnishings and books to adorne his home, making Monticello into a museum. But his agricultural business and schemes are failing and he is in great debt. During the War of 1812 the British burn the Library of Congress, and Jefferson sees an opportunity to sell his vast collection of books. Instead of paying his debt collectors, he replaces all the books he lost, and the Panic of 1819 adds to his financial problems. He feels he has failed as a patriarch and for the first time in his life, he is broke. He decides to leave a legacy and founds the University of Virginia as a secular institution. As Jefferson descends into old age, he wants to be remembered in his own way by writing his autobiography. In his 70s, his health is declining, and he wants to make amends with his once close friend John Adams by reflecting on their life's work. Coincidentally, both die on the same day, July 4, 1826, the 50th anniversary of the Declaration of Independence. In 1943, Franklin D. Roosevelt dedicated the Jefferson Monument as a symbol of freedom against fascism. Today, with DNA testing, Jefferson's descendants of the enslaved community who were scattered all over the country gather on the front steps of Monticello where their ancestors were once sold.

== See also ==
- Cultural depictions of Thomas Jefferson
- List of films about the American Revolution
- List of television series and miniseries about the American Revolution
- Benjamin Franklin (2022 film)
- Washington (2020 History Channel miniseries)
- Grant (2020 History Channel miniseries)
- Abraham Lincoln (2022 History Channel miniseries)
- Theodore Roosevelt (2022 History Channel miniseries)
- FDR (2023 History Channel miniseries)
- Kennedy (2023 History Channel miniseries)
