= From the Diary of Sally Hemings =

- by William Bolcom and Sandra Seaton
- Form: Song cycle
- Text: Sandra Seaton
- Language: English
- Melody: William Bolcom
- Composed: 2001
- Performed: 2001
- Movements: 18

From the Diary of Sally Hemings is a song cycle for voice and piano. The work, commissioned by mezzo-soprano Florence Quivar and Music Accord, is a collaboration between Pulitzer Prize winning composer William Bolcom and playwright Sandra Seaton. After being contacted by Quivar, Bolcom asked Seaton to write entries for a fictional diary kept by Sally Hemings throughout her life. Seaton's text for 18 entries of the imaginary diary were then set to music by Bolcom.

== Plot ==
The work recreates the thoughts and feelings of Sally Hemings throughout her long relationship with Thomas Jefferson by means of fictional diary entries. The 18 songs in this imaginary journal provide an interpretation of the relationship between the two, Hemings officially a slave but also the half-sister of Jefferson's wife, Martha Wayles Jefferson. The songs trace the life of Sally Hemings from her earliest memory, including her recollections of Martha dying from complications following childbirth, to her sojourn in Paris with Jefferson and finally her life with him at Monticello until his death.

== Performance history ==
Florence Quivar performed From The Diary of Sally Hemings in 2001 at the Herbst Theatre in San Francisco, and again at the Coolidge Auditorium in the Library of Congress.

Quivar also performed the song cycle in 2002 at several locations, including: The Rialto Performing Arts Center, Atlanta, Georgia; The Terrace Theater at the Kennedy Center in Washington, D.C.; The Lydia Mendelssohn Theater at the University of Michigan Ann Arbor; and The Lied Center at the University of Kansas, Lawrence, Kansas.

Soprano Alyson Cambridge and pianist Lydia Brown performed From The Diary of Sally Hemings at Carnegie Hall, Central Michigan University, Harkness Memorial Chapel in Cleveland and Oberlin Conservatory. The CD of the production is available for sale at CDBaby. The score of the production is available at Hal Leonard.

== Reception ==
From The Diary of Sally Hemings has been reviewed by numerous newspapers and magazines, including The Washington Post, The Morning Sun, Time Out Magazine, The Michigan Daily, Ann Arbor News, The Capital Journal, The Kansas City Star, and the University of Illinois Arts & letters Magazine.

- Paul Horsley, a correspondent for The Kansas City Star, reviewed the February 2002 Lied Center performance. According to Horsley, "Quivar's velvet voice and experienced dramatic touch made the piece seem more like a miniature opera than a song cycle. Pianist J.J. Penna made the intricate accompaniment seem like a well-crafted narrative, even on the Lied Center's clangorous piano." He went on to critique the rest of the performances of the night, closing his review with these words: “But it was the Hemings tale that stuck in the mind. Would that this piece could find its way into the permanent repertoire, for both its music and its message deserve many hearings."
- Joshua Rosenblum from "Opera News" reviewed the White Pine CD with soprano Alyson Cambridge and pianist Lydia Brown. According to Rosenblum, "Cambridge is an elegant, exuberant Sally, who handles the challenging music and colorful text with ease, providing a thoughtfully conceived, engaging characterization..... Cambridge's beauty of tone is never in dispute"

== Publications and reviews ==
- "Haunted Legacies: Interracial Secrets: From the Diary of Sally Hemings" on the collaboration between composer William Bolcom and librettist Sandra Seaton in Naomi André's Black Opera: History Power and Engagement, University of Illinois Press, 2018.
- “Alyson Cambridge & Michael Fennelly: From the Diary of Sally Hemings,” by Joanne Sydney Lessner in Opera News, February 2018, Vol. 82, No. 8.
- “Alyson Cambridge Sings at The Crypt: William Bolcom’s Song Cycle on Sally Hemings” by Susan Hall in Berkshire Fine Arts, November 16, 2017.
- “Alyson Cambridge/Lydia Brown From the Diary of Sally Hemings: AllMusic Review” by James Manheim in AllMusic online.
- “Alyson Cambridge Recital” by Anne Midgette in The Washington Post, January 21, 2016.
- “Opera News Album Review: From the Diary of Sally Hemings” by Joshua Rosenblum in Opera News, August 1, 2010
- “The First African American First Lady,” by Tony Scotto Di Carlo in Albany Student Press, 2003
- Interview with Sandra Seaton on “From the Diary of Sally Hemings” by Celeste Headlee for WDET-FM Morning Edition, NPR. February 15, 2002.
- “Blackwell & Quivar: Sung with Feeling,” by Ronald Broun in The Washington Post, 2002
- “Singers to Pay Homage to American Composers,” by Bill Blankenship in The Capital Journal, 2002
- “Sandra Seaton: Her First Libretto,” by David Lewman for the University of Illinois Arts and Letters Magazine, 2002
- "Civility in the Writing of Sandra Seaton," by Dedria Humprhies Barker in Muses (Michigan State University College of Arts and Letters), 2001
- “Diaries Give Voice to Hemings' Story” by Georgia Rowe in TimeOut Magazine, 2001
- From the Diary of Sally Hemings was published in Fall of 2001, in the Michigan Quarterly Review. The introduction was written by William Bolcom
- The score is available at the Hal Leonard Corporation.
- CD version is available via White Pine Music, the record label of Central Michigan University.
