= Iron Maiden: Burning Ambition =

- Directed by: Malcolm Venville
- Produced by: Dominic Freeman
- Starring: Steve Harris; Dave Murray; Adrian Smith; Bruce Dickinson; Nicko McBrain; Janick Gers; Rod Smallwood
- Music by: Iron Maiden
- Distributed by: Trafalgar Releasing (UK); Universal Pictures International
- Release date: 7 May 2026
- Running time: 106 minutes
- Countries: United States; United Kingdom
- Languages: English; Polish; Portuguese
- Box office: $3,006,406

Iron Maiden: Burning Ambition is a 2026 documentary film chronicling the rise of the English heavy metal band Iron Maiden over their 50-year career. It is directed by Malcolm Venville. It was released in theatres on 7 May 2026.

== Production ==
The film was announced on 24 February 2026 by its distributor Universal Pictures International. The movie stars the band members of Iron Maiden: Steve Harris, Dave Murray, Adrian Smith, Bruce Dickinson, Nicko McBrain, Janick Gers, and their long-time manager Rod Smallwood. The movie is produced by Dominic Freeman, who also produced Spirits in the Forest. The movie guest stars drummer Lars Ulrich, actor Javier Bardem, guitarist Tom Morello, and Public Enemy frontman Chuck D, among others.

The film chronicles the band's 50-year history. It is composed of archival footage, and animated sequences featuring Eddie, the band's mascot. It also contains band members' audio commentary, who never face the camera, and extensive interviews with fans, who come from all over the world and various walks of life.

== Reception ==
On the review aggregator website Rotten Tomatoes, 87% of 15 critics' reviews are positive, with an average rating of 6.6/10. Metacritic, which uses a weighted average, assigned the film a score of 64 out of 100, based on four critics, indicating "generally favorable" reviews.

Peter Bradshaw, writing for The Guardian, described the movie as an uncritical look at the band's massive rise. He wrote that it is "cheerful and watchable, if a relentlessly on-brand fan promo, corporately policed and controlled", giving it three out of five stars.

The Scenestr review, written by Matt Innes, said the film is a "serviceable rockumentary that does justice to an undisputed icon of heavy metal", which should please the casual observer, while it would be a "validation for years of loyalty" for Iron Maiden fans. Innes also noted that the movie does not mention the 2024 death of the band's original vocalist, Paul Di'Anno.

A review in Time Out, written by Ed Gibbs, said the documentary shows why the band is beloved by so many. Gibbs gave the film three out of five stars and called it "a joyous love letter to Maiden".
