= Sandra Seaton =

American playwright and writer

- Born: Columbia, Tennessee, U.S.
- Education: University of Illinois Urbana-Champaign
- Occupations: Playwright, librettist
- Spouse: James Seaton
- Writing career
- Notable works: The Bridge Party, The Will, Music History, From The Diary of Sally Hemings
- Notable awards: Mark Twain Award
- Website: www.sandraseaton.com

Sandra Cecelia Seaton is an American playwright and librettist. She received the Mark Twain Award from the Society for the Study of Midwestern Literature in 2012. Seaton taught creative writing and African-American literature at Central Michigan University for 15 years as a professor of English.

== Personal life ==
Seaton was born in Columbia, Tennessee, to Albert Sampson Browne Jr. and Hattye Evans, both teachers. After Seaton's parents divorced, her mother remarried and the family moved to Chicago's West Side in 1949. Seaton's grandmother, Emma Louish Evans, often performed at amateur minstrel shows and had a strong influence on her granddaughter's work. Evans gave Seaton a deep pride in the work of Flournoy Miller, a family member, who wrote the book for the pioneering all black musical Shuffle Along in 1921. Seaton graduated from Farragut High School in Chicago and received her Bachelor of Arts from the University of Illinois Urbana-Champaign in Arts and Letters (Creative Writing). At Illinois, she studied with John Frederick Nims, George Scouffas, and Webster Smalley. She earned a Master of Arts degree in creative writing from Michigan State University, where she studied under Linda Wagner-Martin and Robert Martin. Seaton is also a member of Alpha Kappa Alpha sorority.

She married James Seaton, literary critic and professor of English at Michigan State University; the couple has four children.

== Career ==
Seaton is the author of 14 plays, opera librettos, a spoken-word piece, and short fiction. Ruby Dee, Adilah Barnes, Kim Staunton, Michele Shay and Linda Gravatt appeared in a 1998 production of her first play, The Bridge Party, at the University of Michigan, a work inspired by local events. The play is anthologized in Strange Fruit: Plays on Lynching by American Women (1998). Seaton's literary works have been featured by the Michigan State University in their Michigan Writers Series.

Seaton wrote the libretto for the solo opera From the Diary of Sally Hemings (2001) for the composer William Bolcom. The fictional work is a depiction of the innermost thoughts of Sarah "Sally" Hemings, an enslaved woman of mixed race who is believed to have had a sexual relationship with Thomas Jefferson. Bolcom asked Seaton to create "diary" entries that would provide the text for his song cycle From The Diary of Sally Hemings. Seaton spent more than a year doing research to create a "diary" that would be historically plausible. As David Lewman pointed out in an article on Seaton's libretto, "It was a challenge. Though there is voluminous material on Jefferson and his period, there are no surviving examples of writing by Sally Hemings." The work was commissioned by mezzo-soprano Florence Quivar, who sang the piece at the Library of Congress's Coolidge Auditorium, the University Musical Society in Ann Arbor, Michigan, and the Herbst Theatre in San Francisco, and other similar venues. In 2010, soprano Alyson Cambridge performed From the Diary of Sally Hemings at Carnegie Hall.

Seaton has continued to explore the relationship between Sally Hemings and the third president in two plays, Sally, a solo play, and A Bed Made in Heaven, a multi-character play. Sally premiered in 2003 at the New York State Writers Institute featuring Zabryna Guevara. Seaton's play The Will, the story of an African-American family in Tennessee during Reconstruction, was performed in Idlewild, Michigan, the historic black resort, in 2008 as part of an event that focused on the connections between African-American culture and classical music. The character of Patti was inspired by the life of Elizabeth Taylor Greenfield, the African-American opera singer of the Civil War era.

Seaton's comedy Martha Stewart Slept Here, set in an Indiana trailer park, premiered in 2008 and Estate Sale, a comedy set in a Cleveland suburb, in 2011. Music History, a play about African-American college students at the university of Illinois, SNCC, and the struggle for civil rights, was the focus of a 2010 symposium at Michigan State University on the ability of drama to illuminate issues of racial and social justice. Seaton is also the author of "Betty Price and George Nelson, Spreading the News about Modern Design", which appeared in Modernism magazine.

In 2020, Night Trip, a collaboration between Seaton and composer Carlos Simon, was performed at the Kennedy Center as part of their annual American Opera Initiative. According to critic Alex Baker of the Washington Classical Review, part of what "Sandra Seaton’s libretto...especially in the arias for Conchetta, attains a level of poetry that allows for authentic and thrilling fusion between text and score." Writing for A Beast in the Jungle, Mark Rudio described Seaton's lyrics as "transcendent" and credited her and Simon for "not only rising to the challenge of creating a dramatic work that does everything it needs to in just twenty minutes, and for creating an opera that unequivocally succeeds within those extreme limitations." Matthew Guerrieri, in a review for the Washington Post, praised the "candid, vernacular text" for "gradually revealing dramatic and poetic substance."

Seaton taught creative writing and African-American literature at Central Michigan University for 15 years as a professor of English.

== Works ==
Plays

- The Bridge Party (1989)
- The Will (1994)
- Do You Like Philip Roth? (2001)
- Room and Board (2002)
- Sally (2003)
- A Bed Made In Heaven (2005)
- Martha Stewart Slept Here (2008)
- A Chance Meeting (2009)
- Music History (2010)
- Estate Sale (2011)
- The Lookout (2013)
- Black for Dinner (2014)
- Chicago Trilogy (2015)
- The Passion of Mary Cardwell Dawson (2021)

Musicals

- Ogden Avenue (2016)

Films

- From the Diary of Sally Hemings, Glimmer Glass Festival (2020)
- Call Me By Name, Atlanta Black Theatre Festival (2020)
- Call Me By Name, excerpted in Hear Our Cry, (2020)
- The First Bluebird in the Morning, (2020)

Other genres

- "Nightsong" [short story], Obsidian II: Black Literature in Review (Winter 1989)
- King: A Reflection on the Life of Dr. Martin Luther King Jr. (2005). Spoken word with choral accompaniment.
- Libretto: From The Diary of Sally Hemings, Music by William Bolcom (2000), CD: White Pine Music (2010). Score: Hal Leonard (2011)
- Libretto:Vegetarian Wedding, Music by Eric Santos, (2004)
- Libretto: Night Trip, Music by Carlos Simon (2020)
- Libretto: The First Bluebird in the Morning, Music by Carlos Simon (2020)
- Libretto: She Steps onto a Floating Stage, aria, Music by Carlos Simon (2021)
- Libretto: Divided Soul, aria, Music by Carlos Simon (2022)
- Libretto: Rebellious Bird, aria, Music by Carlos Simon (2022)
- Libretto: Dreamland: Tulsa 1921, Ploratorio, Music by Marques L. A. Garrett (2022)

== Awards ==
- Annual Emma Lou Thornbrough Lecture, IUPUI and Butler University, November 2008
- Inaugural writer-in-residence, Michigan State University College of Law 2010-11
- Mark Twain Award from The Society for the Study of Midwestern Literature. 2012
- Theodore Ward Prize
- Residencies: Yaddo and Ragdale artist colonies.
