= White Pine Music =

Record label

White Pine Music logo

The White Pine Music record label was established in 2003 with the support of Central Michigan University's Office of Research and Sponsored Programs and the College of Communication and Fine Arts. The mission of White Pine Music is to record and make available music and musical scholarship of the highest quality, and to preserve and promote the musical heritage of Michigan. Recordings are not defined by genre, but by quality and innovation.

== Projects and artists ==
Projects range from folk music to pipe organ. Artists and partnerships include the Wheatland Music Festival, Freshwater, the Harlem Quartet, Central Michigan University faculty, and others.

== See also ==
- List of record labels
