= Sebastian Roché on screen and stage =

Tv Show Actor

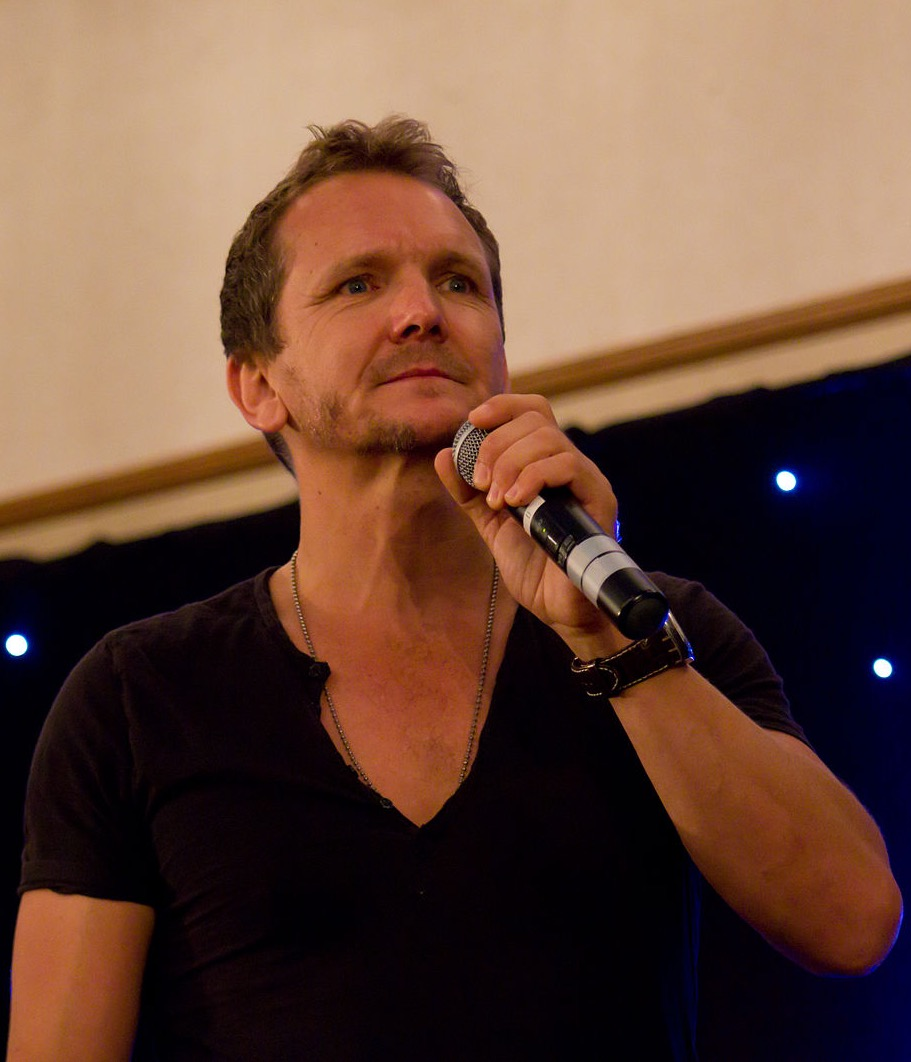
Roché speaking at an event for The Vampire Diaries in June 2013

Sebastian Roché is a Scottish-French-American actor and writer. His extensive television credits also include roles in Fringe, The Vampire Diaries, The Originals, Supernatural, Criminal Minds, Once Upon a Time, Grimm, Scandal, NCIS: Los Angeles, The Young Pope, The Man in the High Castle, and Genius.

Roché's stage credits include the Broadway productions of Salome and The Green Bird, and the West End production of Tartuffe. He has starred in the films The Last of the Mohicans (1992), The Peacemaker (1997), 15 Minutes (2001), Sorry, Haters (2005), The Namesake (2006), Beowulf (2007), Happy Tears (2009), The Adventures of Tintin (2011), Safe House (2012), Wer (2013), A Walk Among the Tombstones (2014), and We Love You, Sally Carmichael! (2017).

== Film ==
Year	Title	Role	Notes
1988	Adieu je t'aime	Thierry	
1988	La Queue de la comète	Joachim	
1989	La Révolution française	Marquis de Dreux-Brézé	Segment: "Years of Hope"
1990	A Woman's Revenge	The Dealer	
1991	A Fine Romance	Actor	Uncredited
1992	The Last of the Mohicans	Martin	
1993	Household Saints	Jesus Christ	
1995	Loungers	James	Also writer
1997	The Peacemaker	Hans the Backpacker	
1998	Into My Heart	Chris	
2001	15 Minutes	Ludwig the Hairdresser	
2002	Never Get Outta the Boat	Soren Dresjac	
2005	Sorry, Haters	Mick Sutcliffe	Uncredited
2005	Seagull	Sebastian	
2006	The Namesake	Pierre Desjardins	
2006	We Fight to Be Free	George Washington	Short film
2007	Beowulf	Wulfgar	
2007	New York City Serenade	Noam Broder	
2007	What We Do Is Secret	Claude Bessy	
2009	Happy Tears	Laurent	
2011	The Adventures of Tintin	1st Mate Pedro	
2012	Safe House	Robert Heissler	Uncredited
2012	Beverly Hills Chihuahua 3: Viva la Fiesta!	Chef Frank Didier	
2013	Wer	Klaus Pistor	
2014	A Walk Among the Tombstones	Yuri Landau	
2014	In Lieu of Flowers: The Final Days of Michael Hastings	Lucas	Short film
2014	Molly's Method	James George	Short film
2014	Phantom Halo	Warren Emerson	
2015	Black Knight Decoded	Command Center Director	Short film
2017	Negative	Rodney	
2017	We Love You, Sally Carmichael!	Perry Quinn	
2017	Last Meal	Felix Blazer	Short film
2019	6 Underground	Lawyer	
2021	Burning at Both Ends	Klaus Jager	Entitled Resistance: 1942 in some territories
2022	Heatwave	Scott Crane	

== Television ==
Year	Title	Role	Notes
1986	The Murders in the Rue Morgue	Henri	Television film (uncredited)
1987	Bonjour maître	Jerry	Miniseries
1989	La grande cabriole	William	Miniseries
1989–1991	The Hitchhiker	Victor Ismael / Glenn Birch	2 episodes
1990	Counterstrike	Mike	Episode: "Escape Route"
1991	L'huissier	Gabriel	Television film
1992	Loving	Peter Rogers	Unknown episodes
1993	South Beach	Boronsky	Episode: "Diamond in the Rough"
1994	Normandy: The Great Crusade	Alastair Bannerman	Television film
1993	Law & Order	Clarence Carmichael	Episode: "Discord"
1996	Swift Justice	Tony Jacks	Episode: "Sex, Death and Rock 'n' Roll"
1996	New York Undercover	Domenick Rallo	Episode: "Smack Is Back"
1997	Roar	Saint Longinus	13 episodes
1997	Feds	Domenick Rallo	Episode: "Somebody's Lyin"
1997	Liberty!	Marquis de Lafayette	Episode: "The World Turned Upside Down"
1997	Dellaventura	Van Kelk	Episode: "In Deadly Fashion"
1998	Sex and the City	Jerry	Episode: "The Turtle and the Hare"
1998	Merlin	Sir Gawain	Miniseries
1998	Naked City: Justice with a Bullet	Marco	Television film
1999	Law & Order	Ken Taylor	Episode: "Patsy"
1999	The Hunley	Frank Collins	Television film
2000	Baby	Rebel Clark	Television film
2000	The Crossing	Col. John Glover	Television film
2001	Big Apple	Vladimir Mogilevich	4 episodes
2001	Haven	Johan Ritter	Television film
2002–2003	Odyssey 5	Kurt Mendel	20 episodes
2002	Benjamin Franklin	Vicomte	Miniseries; 3 episodes
2004	Touching Evil	Stephan Laney	Episode: "Slash 30"
2004	Earthsea	King Rey Tygath	Miniseries; 2 episodes
2005	CSI: Crime Scene Investigation	Josh Frost / Moriarty	Episode: "Who Shot Sherlock"
2005	Charmed	The Sorcerer	Episode: "Carpe Demon"
2005	Nova	Louis Blériot	Episode: "A Daring Flight"
2005	Alias	Willem Karg	Episode: "Echoes"
2006	The Unit	Colonel Leclerq	Episode: "The Wall"
2007	American Masters	John James Audubon	Episode: "John James Audubon: Drawn from Nature"
2007–2015	General Hospital	James Craig/Jerry Jacks	319 episodes
2008	24: Redemption	John Quinn	Television film
2009	The Mentalist	Shirali Arlov	Episode: "Paint It Red"
2009	24	John Quinn	2 episodes
2009	The Beautiful Life: TBL	Nikolai Marinelli	Episode: "The Beautiful Lie"
2009–2010	Fringe	Thomas Jerome Newton	10 episodes
2010–2011	Supernatural	Balthazar	6 episodes
2011	The Vampire Diaries	Mikael	5 episodes
2011–2012	Criminal Minds	Clyde Easter	5 episodes
2012	Unforgettable	Victor Cushman	Episode: "Heartbreak"
2012	Pegasus vs. Chimera	Belleros	Television film
2012	Grimm	Edgar Waltz	Episode: "Cat and Mouse"
2013	Burn Notice	Roger Steele	Episode: "Things Unseen"
2013–2018	The Originals	Mikael	16 episodes
2014	Scandal	Dominic Bell	2 episodes
2015	Once Upon a Time	King Stefan	Episode: "Enter the Dragon"
2015	The Mystery of Matter: Search for the Elements	Pierre Curie	Episode: "Unruly Elements"
2015	NCIS: Los Angeles	Lee Ashman	Episode: "An Unlocked Mind"
2016	Royal Pains	Guy Childs	2 episodes
2016	Bones	Inspector Rousseau	Episode: "The Jewel in the Crown"
2016	The Young Pope	Cardinal Michel Marivaux	5 episodes
2016–2018	The Man in the High Castle	Martin Heusmann	7 episodes
2017	Valor	Orson Lavoy	Episode: "Blurred Lines"
2018	Genius	Emile Gilot	5 episodes
2018	Law & Order: Special Victims Unit	Arlo Beck	Episode: "Accredo"
2019	Strange Angel	Professor Thompson	Episode: "The Tower"
2019–2020	Batwoman	Dr. Ethan Campbell / August Cartwright	4 episodes
2020	MacGyver	Hannibal Teague	Episode: "Thief + Painting + Auction + Viro-486 + Justice"
2021	Debris	Agent Brill	3 episodes
2021	Big Sky	Sheriff John Wagy	6 episodes
2021	Magnum P.I.	Zev Marker	Episode: "Texas Wedge"
2022	Guillermo del Toro's Cabinet of Curiosities	Roland	Episode: "Lot 36"
2022–2025	1923	Father Renaud	Recurring role; miniseries
2024	Queen of Tears	Dr. Liam Braun	Episode 5-6-7

== Stage ==
Year	Title	Role	Notes
1992	Salome	Unknown	Circle in the Square Theatre
1994	Titus Andronicus	Prince Demetrius	Theatre at St Clement's
1994	Macbeth	Lord Macduff	Classic Stage Company
1995	Mirandolina	Count of Albafiorita	McCarter Theatre
1995	Arms and the Man	Sergius Saranoff	Hartford Stage
1998	Trainspotting	Franco Begbie	Players Theater
1998	Trainspotting	Johnny Swann	Players Theater
2000	The Green Bird	Prince Renzo	Cort Theatre
2018	Tartuffe	Orgon	Theatre Royal Haymarket

== Video games ==
Year	Title	Role
2007	Beowulf: The Game	Wulfgar
2010	MAG	Raven Executive
2016	Mafia III	Additional voices
