= Boyd Kestner =

American actor

Boyd Kestner (born November 23, 1964) is an American actor. His career has included leading and recurring roles in television, appearances in major studio and independent films, and stage work. He portrayed Darrel "Darry" Curtis in the 1990 television series The Outsiders and later had a recurring role as Alex Barth in the CBS prime-time drama Knots Landing. His film credits include G.I. Jane (1997), The General's Daughter (1999), Hannibal (2001), Black Hawk Down (2001), Divine Secrets of the Ya-Ya Sisterhood (2002), and Appaloosa (2008).

== Early life ==
Kestner was born on November 23, 1964, in Manassas, Virginia. He is the identical twin brother of Bryan Kestner.

Kestner studied acting in New York and Los Angeles, including at Sandra Lee's Actors Study in New York.

== Career ==
Kestner began his screen career in the late 1980s, appearing in the 1987 film The Running Man, for which he was credited as Boyd R. Kestner.

Kestner gained wider recognition in 1990 when he was cast as Darrel "Darry" Curtis, the eldest of the Curtis brothers, in the Fox television series The Outsiders. The series continued the story and characters of S. E. Hinton's novel and Francis Ford Coppola's 1983 film adaptation. Coppola served as an executive producer of the television series alongside Fred Roos, with Hinton involved in its development. Kestner was one of the series' principal cast members, portraying Darry as the eldest of the three orphaned Curtis brothers and head of their household. The 90-minute premiere became the highest-rated dramatic program in Fox's history at the time.

In 1992, Kestner joined the cast of the CBS prime-time drama Knots Landing as Alex Barth. His arrival was part of a series of changes to the long-running drama as its producers introduced new characters and storylines. In a contemporary Los Angeles Times article about the changes, Kestner and Felicity Waterman were identified as two new additions whose characters would become intertwined with the show's established cast. Kestner appeared as Alex Barth in 13 episodes during 1992. The character, the nephew of Claudia Whittaker's housekeeper, became involved in a storyline in which he blackmailed Claudia over the circumstances surrounding her mother's death.

During the 1990s and 2000s, Kestner worked in both television and feature films. His film appearances included Ridley Scott's G.I. Jane (1997), The General's Daughter (1999), Hannibal (2001), and Black Hawk Down (2001). His subsequent work included Divine Secrets of the Ya-Ya Sisterhood (2002), Appaloosa (2008), and Acts of Violence (2018).

Alongside his studio work, Kestner appeared in independent and international productions. In Jon Reiss's psychological drama Cleopatra's Second Husband, he portrayed Zack. Reviewing the film, Los Angeles Times critic Kevin Thomas described it as a "diabolically clever psychological suspense movie" and wrote that what director Jon Reiss was able to draw from Kestner and co-star Paul Hipp was "amazing".

In 2001, Kestner portrayed Seth opposite Melanie Lynskey in Gillian Ashurst's New Zealand feature Snakeskin. The film was screened as part of the 2001 New Zealand International Film Festival.

Kestner has also worked in theater. He portrayed Ronnie in the West Coast premiere of Mark Roberts's Parasite Drag at the Elephant Theater in Los Angeles. Reviewing the production, Los Angeles Times theater critic Charles McNulty described it as a "sincerely acted production" and noted the conviction of the ensemble.

== Filmography ==
=== Film ===
Year	Title	Role	Notes
1987	The Running Man	Bio Technician	
1996	Entertaining Angels: The Dorothy Day Story	Lionel Moise	
1997	G.I. Jane	Wickwire	
1998	Cleopatra’s Second Husband	Zack Tyler	
1998	Bubba and Ike	Ike	
1999	The General's Daughter	Capt. Jake Elby	
1999	Goosed	Joey Murphy	
1999	The Art of Murder	Tony Blanchard	
2001	Hannibal	Special Agent Burke	
2001	Snakeskin	Seth	
2001	Black Hawk Down	Goffena	
2002	Divine Secrets of the Ya-Ya Sisterhood	Adult Shep Walker Jr.	
2004	Until the Night	David	
2006	Family	Eldon	
2006	The Insatiable	Detective Michael Loper	
2008	Appaloosa	Bronc	
2010	Hanna's Gold	Frank	
2012	The Aggression Scale	Bill	
2013	Trust Me	Older Guard	
2014	The Big Bad City	Detective Scheck	
2015	Zoey to the Max	Big Red	
2015	Little Loopers	Hutch McGee	Also writer and producer
2015	Double Daddy	Jeff	
2015	The Breakup Girl	Young Bob	
2016	Depraved	Morgan	
2017	You Get Me	Mr. Hanson	
2018	Acts of Violence	Stevens	
2019	Hell Girl	Morgan	

=== Television ===
Year	Title	Role	Notes
1990	The Outsiders	Darrel 'Darry' Curtis	13 episodes
1992	Somebody's Daughter	Toby	Television film
1992	Knots Landing	Alex Barth	13 episodes
1992	Amy Fisher: My Story	Paul Makely	Television film
1993–1994	Diagnosis: Murder	Tommy Raffanti / Roger Davis	3 episodes
1994	Ray Alexander: A Taste for Justice	Brad Dexter	Television film
2000	Hell Swarm	Billy Sabbath	Television film
2000	Ally McBeal	Dr. Greg Barrett	Episode: "Love on Holiday"
2002	Astronauts	Steve Masse	Television film
2004	CSI: Miami	Jeff Latham	Episode: "Not Landing"
2014	Agents of S.H.I.E.L.D.	Agent Richard Lumley	Episode: "Seeds"
2016	Rush Hour	Emmett Perry	Episode: "Wind Beneath my Wingman"
