= Jamie Anderson (cinematographer) =

American cinematographer

- Born: September 23, 1946 (age 79); New York City, New York, U.S.
- Years active: 1972–2009

Jamie Anderson (Born September 23, 1946) is an American cinematographer.

== Filmography ==
=== Film ===
Year	Title	Director
1976	Hollywood Boulevard	Allan Arkush; Joe Dante
1976	The Great Texas Dynamite Chase	Michael Pressman
1978	Malibu Beach	Robert J. Rosenthal
1978	Piranha	Joe Dante
1992	Unlawful Entry	Jonathan Kaplan
1993	What's Love Got to Do with It	Brian Gibson
1995	Man of the House	James Orr
1996	The Juror	Brian Gibson
1997	Grosse Pointe Blank	George Armitage
1997	The Odd Couple II	Howard Deutch
1998	Small Soldiers	Joe Dante
2000	The Flintstones in Viva Rock Vegas	Brian Levant
2000	The Gift	Sam Raimi
2001	Jay and Silent Bob Strike Back	Kevin Smith
2003	Bad Santa	Terry Zwigoff
2004	The Girl Next Door	Luke Greenfield
2006	Art School Confidential	Terry Zwigoff
2006	Comeback Season	Bruce McCulloch
2009	Happy Tears	Mitchell Lichtenstein

Short film

Year	Title	Director
1994	Everybody Can Float	Kate Lanier

Acting roles

Year	Title	Role	Notes
1973	The Student Teachers	Male Hippie	
1974	Truck Turner	Man with Water Jug	Uncredited
1975	White Line Fever	Jamie Kane	

=== Television ===
Year	Title	Director	Notes
1989	Snoops	Burt Kennedy	Episode "Hotshot"
1995	Picture Windows	Joe Dante	Episode "Lightning"
1988	The Temptations	Allan Arkush	Miniseries
1999	ER	Jonathan Kaplan	Episode "Middle of Nowhere"
1999	Snoops	Allan Arkush	Episode "Pilot"
2002	The Court	Jonathan Kaplan	Episode "Life Sentence"
2002-2007	Crossing Jordan		34 episodes

TV movies

Year	Title	Director
1998	The Warlord: Battle for the Galaxy	Joe Dante
2001	Prince Charming	Allan Arkush
