= Michael Small =

American composer (1939–2003)

- Born: May 30, 1939; New York City, US
- Died: November 24, 2003 (aged 64); New York City, US
- Occupation: Film score composer
- Years active: 1969–2003
- Spouse: Lynn Goldberg

Michael Small (May 30, 1939 – November 24, 2003) was an American film score composer known for his scores to thriller movies such as Klute, The Parallax View, Marathon Man, and The Star Chamber.

== Personal life ==
Small was born in New York City but grew up in Maplewood, New Jersey. His father, Jack Small, was an actor and later, the general manager of the Shubert Theater in New York City. Small did his undergraduate work at Williams College where he graduated with a degree in English. He later studied for a year at Harvard University.

Small died from prostate cancer on November 24, 2003, at the age of 64.

== Filmography ==
Year	Film	Director	Notes
1969	Out of It	Paul Williams	
1970	Jenny	George Bloomfield	
1970	Light	Paul Cohen	
1970	The Revolutionary	Paul Williams	
1970	Puzzle of a Downfall Child	Jerry Schatzberg	
1971	The Sporting Club	Larry Peerce	soundtrack Buddah Records BDS 95002
1971	Klute	Alan J. Pakula	soundtrack Film Score Monthly FSM1016
1972	Dealing: Or the Berkeley-to-Boston Forty-Brick Lost-Bag Blues	Paul Williams	soundtrack Warner Bros. 7557 (7" promo)
1972	Child's Play	Sidney Lumet	
1973	Love and Pain and the Whole Damn Thing	Alan J. Pakula	
1973	Portrait of a Railroad	Harvey Lloyd	soundtrack Atco Records 23898
1974	The Parallax View	Alan J. Pakula	soundtrack Film Score Monthly FSM1305
1975	The Stepford Wives	Bryan Forbes	
1975	Night Moves	Arthur Penn	
1975	The Drowning Pool	Stuart Rosenberg	
1976	Marathon Man	John Schlesinger	soundtrack Film Score Monthly FSM1305
1977	Pumping Iron	George Butler; Robert Fiore	
1977	Audrey Rose	Robert Wise	
1978	The Driver	Walter Hill	soundtrack Intrada Special Collection 33
1978	Girlfriends	Claudia Weill	
1978	Comes a Horseman	Alan J. Pakula	soundtrack Intrada Special Collection 61
1979	The China Syndrome	James Bridges	unused score Intrada Special Collection 110
1979	Going in Style	Martin Brest	
1980	The Lathe of Heaven (TV)	Fred Barzyk; David Loxton	
1980	The Boy Who Drank Too Much (TV)	Jerrold Freedman	
1980	Those Lips, Those Eyes	Michael Pressman	
1981	The Postman Always Rings Twice	Bob Rafelson	
1981	Continental Divide	Michael Apted	
1981	Rollover	Alan J. Pakula	
1982	La donna giusta	Paul Williams	
1983	The Star Chamber	Peter Hyams	soundtrack Intrada Special Collection 33
1983	Chiefs (TV miniseries)	Jerry London	
1984	Kidco	Ronald F. Maxwell	soundtrack Intrada Signature Edition ISE1044
1984	Firstborn	Michael Apted	
1985	Target	Arthur Penn	
1986	Dream Lover	Alan J. Pakula	
1986	Nobody's Child	Lee Grant	
1986	Brighton Beach Memoirs	Gene Saks	soundtrack MCA Records MCA-6193
1987	Black Widow	Bob Rafelson	soundtrack Intrada Special Collection 29
1987	Jaws: The Revenge	Joseph Sargent	soundtrack Intrada Special Collection MSML 1001
1987	Orphans	Alan J. Pakula	
1987	Heat and Sunlight	Rob Nilsson	
1988	1969	Ernest Thompson	
1989	See You in the Morning	Alan J. Pakula	
1990	Mountains of the Moon	Bob Rafelson	soundtrack Polydor Records 843 013-2
1990	American Dream	Barbara Kopple	
1991	Mobsters	Michael Karbelnikoff	soundtrack Varèse Sarabande VSD5334
1992	Consenting Adults	Alan J. Pakula	soundtrack Milan Records 35630
1993	Alex Haley's Queen (TV)	John Erman	
1994	Wagons East	Peter Markle	soundtrack Varèse Sarabande VSD5533
1998	Poodle Springs (TV)	Bob Rafelson	
1998	Into My Heart	Sean Smith; Anthony Stark	
1999	American Masters "Norman Rockwell: Painting America" (TV)	Elena Mannes	
2000	The Golden Spiders: A Nero Wolfe Mystery (TV)	Paul Monash	
2000	The Endurance: Shackleton's Legendary Antarctic Expedition	George Butler	
2001	Rodgers & Hammerstein's South Pacific (TV)	Richard Pearce	original music
2001–2002	A Nero Wolfe Mystery (TV series)	Timothy Hutton; John L'Ecuyer; George Bloomfield; Neill Fearnley; Michael Jaffe; John R. Pepper; James Tolkan; Holly Dale	
