= Self Helpless =

- Starring: Patrick Simone; Andrick Deppmeyer; Matthew Dunbar; Patrick Cassidy
- Cinematography: Patrick Simone
- Music by: Devin the Dude; Nortec Collective; SOJA; Ska Cubano; Los Locos; Mr. Ozwald; David Veslocki; Patrick Simone; Los Musicos De Jose
- Distributed by: End of the World Entertainment
- Release date: March 2010
- Running time: 81 minutes
- Country: United States
- Language: English

Self Helpless is a 2010 independent film. The film is a feature-length comedy created by the production company End of the World Entertainment. Self Helpless stars Patrick Simone, Matthew Dunbar, Andrick Deppmeyer, and Patrick Cassidy. The four main actors also wrote, directed, produced, funded, and distributed the film.

== Plot ==
Simon, John Candy, Felix, and The Drake are friends who are generally unhappy with their lot in life. Simon is a troubled, unsuccessful birthday party magician. John Candy is a DJ at a local dive bar. Felix is miserable in his position as a lawyer at a local law firm. The Drake lives with his unpleasant girlfriend and works at a landscaping company.

Each character attempts to improve his situation by blindly following the advice of a self-help book. Each of these attempts at self-improvement end up making the character's lives worse. Felix and John Candy are both fired from their jobs, The Drake is kicked out of his girlfriend's house, and Simon is incarcerated multiple times.

While under the influence of marijuana, Simon and The Drake decide to google the word God, in order to find out “if God has the interweb”. The Drake mistakenly enters d-o-g into his search engine and he is directed to a Mexican website advertising Don Rodrigo's dog grooming service. Simon and The Drake do not speak Spanish, so they convince John Candy to translate the site for them. John Candy's mistranslation of the site leads the friends to believe that the Don Rodrigo is an all-knowing guru, and they must make a pilgrimage to visit him.

Once in Mexico, Simon, Felix, and John Candy set off to find a hostel. The Drake separates from the group in search of marijuana. The Drake finds a man who offers to sell him marijuana and he follows him to a ramshackle building where a number of imposing Mexican gangsters are waiting. The Drake quickly befriends the gangsters and begins drinking tequila, smoking marijuana, and using cocaine with them. Meanwhile, the other three friends mistakenly offend a well-dressed Mexican man, and they are abducted and beaten mercilessly.

The Drake is passed out at the gangster's hideout when he is awoken and dragged out to a rooftop where he is handed a gun and told to execute three men to prove that he is loyal to the gangsters. In his drug-addled haze, The Drake fails to recognize the three hooded victims as his friends. The confusion is quickly cleared up when The Drake fires a shot that slightly grazes Simon's arm. Once the gangsters realize that all of their hostages are friends with The Drake, they invite the entire group to return to their hideout for a party.

The Mexican gangsters drop off the four friends at the Don Rodrigo's house where the spend time learning from their newfound guru. The film culminates with Simon, yet again, on the verge of a mental breakdown as he fights to control his aggressive impulses.

== Cast ==
- Patrick Simone - Simon
- Andrick Deppmeyer - The Drake
- Matthew Dunbar - Felix
- Patrick Cassidy - John Candy
- Alberto Velasco - Don Rodrigo
- Jaime DelAguila - Juan
- Abel Gonzales - Armando
- Ellen Pilch - Diner Waitress
- Kylie Clay - Vanessa
- John Long - Mr. Johnson
- Connor Long - Jerry
- Jack Cassidy - John Candy's Father
- Devin the Dude - The Dude

== Production ==
Self Helpless was filmed in digital high definition. The production was funded entirely by the film's creators for under $10,000, who built their own camera and lighting accessories, forged permits, and manufactured their own explosions. Production locations included Mexico City, and San Cristobal de las Casas, Mexico, Vermont, Connecticut, and Washington, D.C. Rapper Devin the Dude makes his screen acting debut in Self Helpless. He also contributes two songs to the soundtrack.

== Reception ==
Self Helpless was featured in the 2010 Filmmaker Summit at Slamdance. The film was part of Jon Reiss' presentation on audience development techniques. Self Helpless was included because of its unique bittorrent release strategy.

Self Helpless was nominated for the Best Young Filmmaker Award at the 2009 Queens International Film Festival.

A review in Burlington, Vermont newspaper Seven Days said that Self Helpless contains "... A fast paced narrative, a rocking soundtrack, and plenty of self deprecating sicko-stoner humor."

Reviewer and filmmaker Angelo Bell described Self Helpless in his review as, "... a charming low brow slacker-buddies comedy".

Roguecinema.com reviewed Self Helpless. They described the film as, "... so over the top that it goes from unfunny back to funny again."

== Distribution ==
Self Helpless is being self-distributed by End of the World Entertainment. The production company is using a unique "bittorent-only" release model. Self Helpless will be released exclusively on a number of bittorrent indexes for a seven-day period, after which End of the World Entertainment will begin retail DVD and digital download sales from their website.
