= Anthony Stark =

Anthony Stark may refer to:

- Anthony Stark (director) (1961–2011), American film director and screenwriter
- Anthony "Tony" Stark, also known as Iron Man, a Marvel Comics superhero
  - Tony Stark (Marvel Cinematic Universe)

== See also ==
- Anthony Starke (born 1963), American actor
- Anthony Starks (1873–1952), English rugby league footballer
