= Alicia Hannah-Kim =

Australian actress

- Hannah-Kim in 2026
- Born: 1987 or 1988 (age 38–39); Sydney, Australia
- Years active: 2003–present
- Spouse: Sebastian Roché (m. 2014)

Alicia Hannah-Kim, sometimes billed as Alicia Hannah, is an Australian film and television actress best known for her portrayal of sensei Kim Da-Eun in the final two seasons of the Netflix series Cobra Kai.

== Career ==
Hannah-Kim was born and raised in Sydney, Australia. She is of Korean ancestry. She attended the Australian Theatre for Young People (ATYP).

Hannah-Kim appeared in the Australian television series White Collar Blue, the Freeform series Alone Together, the ABC series Grey's Anatomy and General Hospital, the Starz series Crash, and the HBO Max series Minx

Hannah-Kim joined the cast of the Netflix series Cobra Kai in its fifth season, in the role of sensei Kim Da-Eun, a sensei from the Korean branch of the Cobra Kai dojo.

== Television ==
Year	Title	Role	Notes
2022–2025	Cobra Kai	Kim Da-Eun	14 episodes
2025	Tempest	TBA	

== Personal life ==
On May 31, 2014, Kim married actor Sebastian Roché at the Chateau Les Bouysses in Mercuès, France.

In June 2025, fellow Cobra Kai star Martin Kove was asked to leave a fan convention in Puyallup, Washington, "after allegedly biting co-star Alicia Hannah-Kim during a VIP meet-and-greet". Kove reportedly bit Hannah-Kim on the arm, and when she protested, kissed her arm where he had bitten her. Hannah-Kim opted not to press charges, and later released a statement asking fans not to hold the incident against the show.
