= Better Living Through Circuitry =

- Directed by: Jon Reiss
- Produced by: Cleopatra Records, Parasite Production
- Starring: Moby, Lord T. Byron, McGuinnes
- Distributed by: Seventh Art Releasing (7AR)
- Release date: 1999
- Running time: 85 minutes
- Country: United States
- Language: English
- Budget: $100,000

Better Living Through Circuitry is a 1999 documentary directed by Jon Reiss about the electronic dance music cultural scene of the 1990s. This is considered to be the first full-length documentary film that goes behind the electronic dance scene and uncovers the culture it has spawned. The film presented aspects of rave culture such as: empowerment through advances in musical electronics technology, the DIY (do-it-yourself) ethic, and the flowering of a new spirituality embracing transcendence through sound and rhythm. A cross-section of the techno subculture is represented. In the documentary, ravers, DJs and musicians speak for themselves about their music and ideals. Produced by Cleopatra Pictures and Entertainment Group, presided by Cleopatra Records founder Brian Perera.

== Participants ==
The documentary features in-depth interviews with Moby, Genesis P-Orridge, Wolfgang Flür, Brian Transeau, DJ Spooky, DJ Keoki, The Crystal Method, Roni Size, Electric Skychurch, Carl Cox, Frankie Bones.

Better Living Through Circuitry equally emphasizes graphic designers, promoters, fans and other essential components of the scene, such as Mike Szabo, whose flyers for "N.A.S.A." (Nocturnal Audio + Sensory Awakening) events at Club Shelter, are part of the permanent collection of the Smithsonian Museum and the Pure Children/Earth Program Collective who worked and lived in a New York City loft space from which they created graphics, promoted raves and managed their own record label.

== Production ==
Filming started in March 1997, with a budget of $100,000, at the Winter Music Conference. In keeping with the theme of "empowerment through technology" Better Living Through Circuitry utilized some of what was considered, at the time of production, the latest digital film-making equipment. It was all filmed on a tiny Sony VX1000 digital video camera, which was usually taken by the director into raves in a backpack.

== Post-production ==
Virtually all post-production including editing, on-line, titles and effects were all performed in a spare bedroom of the producer's apartment using the Media 100 non-linear digital editing system and Adobe After Effects software on a Power Macintosh computer.

== Soundtrack ==
1. "Truth in the Eyes of a Spaceship (Edit)" – Spaceship Eyes
2. "Expander (Remix)" – The Future Sound of London (as Future Sound of London)
3. "Now Is the Time (Millennium Remix)" – The Crystal Method (as Crystal Method)
4. "Endor Fun (Edit)" – LCD
5. "Money for E" – Psychic TV
6. "Peace In Zaire" – DJ Spooky
7. "Brown Paper Bag" – Roni Size
8. "Parts 1-4" – Meat Beat Manifesto
9. "Cetch Da Monkey" – Atomic Babies
10. "Freaks" – Überzone (as T. Wiles)
11. "Caterpillar" – Keoki
12. "Deus" – Electric Skychurch

== Reception ==
The film holds an 82% rating on Rotten Tomatoes based on 17 reviews.

== See also ==
- Modulations: Cinema for the Ear
- Groove
- Gramaphone Records
