= Angelica (2015 film) =

Film by Mitchell Lichtenstein

- Theatrical release poster
- Directed by: Mitchell Lichtenstein
- Screenplay by: Mitchell Lichtenstein
- Based on: Angelica by Arthur Phillips
- Produced by: Mitchell Lichtenstein; Joyce M. Pierpoline
- Starring: Jena Malone; Janet McTeer; Ed Stoppard; Tovah Feldshuh
- Cinematography: Dick Pope
- Edited by: Andrew Hafitz; Lee Percy
- Music by: Zbigniew Preisner
- Production company: Pierpoline Films
- Distributed by: Freestyle Digital Media
- Release dates: February 7, 2015 (Berlin); November 17, 2017 (United States)
- Running time: 95 minutes
- Country: United States
- Language: English

Angelica is a 2015 American horror thriller film written and directed by Mitchell Lichtenstein. The film stars Jena Malone, Janet McTeer, Ed Stoppard, and Tovah Feldshuh. It is based on the 2007 novel of the same name by Arthur Phillips.

== Cast ==
- Jena Malone as Constance
  - Glynnis O'Connor as older Constance
- Janet McTeer as Anne Montague
- Ed Stoppard as Dr. Joseph Barton
- Tovah Feldshuh as Nora
- Charles Keating as Dr. Miles
- Henry Stram as Dr. Willette
- Daniel Gerroll as Dr. Pinfield-Smith
- James Norton as Harry

== Production ==
Principal photography took place in April 2013 around London, with scenes filmed at Lincoln's Inn. Some scenes were shot at the Chatham Historic Dockyard in Kent, South East England.

== Release ==
It was screened in the Panorama section of the 65th Berlin International Film Festival on February 7, 2015. In September 2017, Freestyle Digital Media purchased the United States distribution rights, and released the film in limited theaters and on digital platforms on November 17, 2017. It was released on DVD in the United Kingdom by Signature Entertainment on June 18, 2018.

== Reception ==
On the review aggregator website Rotten Tomatoes, 70% of 10 critics' reviews are positive, with an average rating of 5.610/10. Metacritic, which uses a weighted average, assigned the film a score of 56 out of 100, based on 5 critics, indicating "mixed or average" reviews.

Scott Foundas of Variety wrote "But at least Angelica is never boring. No movie where the main character is repeatedly raped by an ectoplasmic incubus sporting an anaconda-sized phallus could be accused of that".
