= Nora Ariffin =

Singaporean fashion model and realtor

- Born: Norhana Ariffin; Singapore
- Partner: Duncan Sheik (2011–2026)
- Modeling information
- Height: 5 ft 9 in (1.75 m)
- Hair color: Black
- Eye color: Brown
- Agency: Elite Models (New York)

Nora Ariffin is a Singaporean fashion model and real estate broker.

== Education ==
Ariffin went to school in Singapore at St. Margaret's Secondary School.

== Modeling career ==
While Ariffin was working at the Blue Ginger boutique, designer Kelvin Khoo took photos of her modelling clothes for the boutique. Eileen Abisheganaden who owned the boutique liked the photos and introduced her to Dick Lee, a partner at modelling agency Carrie Models.

She has appeared in campaigns for CoverGirl, alongside models including Rachel Hunter and Niki Taylor, Lacoste, L'Oréal, and Chanel's Allure fragrance. Ariffin has also been featured in editorials for Vogue Paris and Italian Harper's Bazaar and graced the cover of Italian Cosmopolitan and Marie Claire (Singapore, Malaysia). Ariffin has worked with photographers including Guy Bourdin, Herb Ritts, and Gilles Bensimon.

== Other career ==
Ariffin has been a real estate broker since 2004.

== Personal life ==
Since 2011, Ariffin had been in a relationship with singer Duncan Sheik, having previously dated in 1999. They welcomed a daughter in 2018. Sheik died on 17 September 2026 from heart and organ failure. Some sources have stated they were married by the time of Sheik’s death.

== Filmography ==
Film
Year	Title	Role	Notes	Ref
1988	Too Beautiful to Die	Leslie		
1998	Into My Heart	Waitress		
