= DJ Keoki =

Superstar DJ Keoki
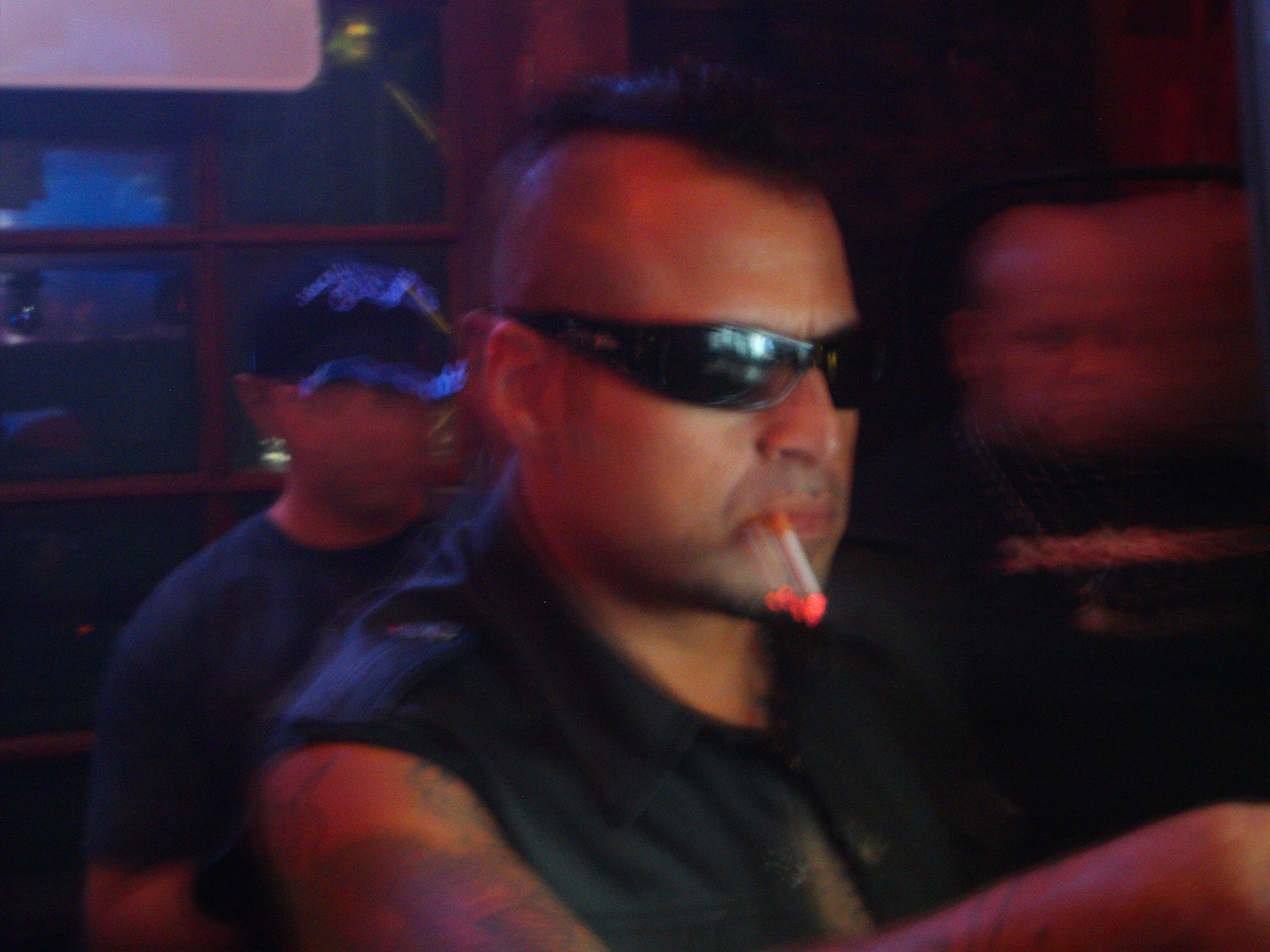

Background information
- Also known as: Keoki Franconi
- Born: George Lopez; October 23, 1966 (age 59); El Salvador
- Origin: Kihei, Maui, Hawaii, U.S.
- Genres: Electronic
- Occupations: Musician, producer, DJ
- Years active: 1980s–present

George Lopez (born October 23, 1966), known by his stage name DJ Keoki or Keoki Franconi, is a Salvadoran-American electronic musician and DJ. Born in El Salvador and raised in Hawaii, Keoki began advertising himself as "superstar" shortly after moving to New York City.

== Biography ==
Keoki Franconi was born in El Salvador. He moved to Kihei, Maui, when he was 8. After graduating from Kailua High School, he moved to the mainland to study at an airline school in California. Franconi worked at several airlines in New York City, among them the now defunct Trans World Airlines. He also was a busboy at Danceteria club during this time. That was where he began to start DJing. He recalls,

I kept bugging a nearby club's manager to, please, please, please let me DJ there. I told him I knew how to do it, even though I only had a small collection of records and one turntable at home. He let me play a lounge gig on some of the slower nights. He told me to 'play whatever the fuck you want, so long as they stay,' words I've continued to live by to this day.

— DJ Keoki,

=== Club Kids and Michael Alig ===
While in New York City, he met and began a romance with Michael Alig. Alig rose to international notability as the head of the Club Kids, a group of diverse people who would dress in costumes each night and form parties in New York and across the United States.

Dance music writer Jennifer Warner remembers,

I was marking the side of a mile-high stack of party invites with a huge purple pen and this body appeared, covered in silver glitter, wearing what looked like a diaper and dragging a boy [Michael Alig], also sporting a falling-off diaper, minus the glitter but made up like a clown.

— Jennifer Warner,

While DJing at "Disco 2000", Alig's party night at the Limelight, Franconi was alleged to have passed out on the turntables while performing a set. He denied the allegation.

In January 2017, he was arrested in New York City after a man in his apartment died of a drug overdose, when the officers entering his apartment found it contained illegal narcotics. Following the incident, he entered a rehabilitation program and announced the cancellation of all of his upcoming events.

== Discography ==
1991 – DJ Keoki Presents Disco 2000 – Volume One (12")
1991 – DJ Keoki Presents Disco 2000 – Volume Two (12")
1993 – We Are One
1994 – Journeys By DJ 1995 – All Mixed Up
1996 – Disco Death Race 2000
1996 – The Transatlantic Move
1997 – Ego Trip
1998 – Inevitable Alien Nation
1998 – Altered Ego Trip (The Remix Album)
2000 – djmixed.com/keoki
2001 – Jealousy (also released in a Limited Edition 2XCD version with bonus CD w/ exclusive remixes)
2002 – Keokiclash
2002 – Misdirected Jealousy: The Remix Album
2003 – Kill The DJ
2004 – The Great Soundclash Swindle
2010 – Talking to Yourself
2019 – Born to Attack

== In popular media ==
- His song "Caterpillar" was featured in "Raging Abe Simpson and His Grumbling Grandson in 'The Curse of the Flying Hellfish'", a 1996 episode of The Simpsons.
- Keoki was interviewed for the 1999 film Better Living Through Circuitry, a documentary discussing electronic dance music culture.
- James St. James depicts Keoki in the 1999 memoir Disco Bloodbath: A Fabulous but True Tale of Murder in Clubland.
- Wilmer Valderrama portrays Keoki in the 2003 film Party Monster, a biopic about James St. James and Michael Alig.

== See also ==
- LGBT culture in New York City
- List of LGBT people from New York City
