= Into My Heart =

- Directed by: Sean Smith; Anthony Stark
- Written by: Sean Smith; Anthony Stark
- Produced by: Letty Aronson; J. E. Beaucaire; Jean Doumanian
- Starring: Rob Morrow; Claire Forlani; Jake Weber; Jayne Brook; Sebastian Roché
- Cinematography: Michael F. Barrow
- Edited by: Robert M. Reitano; Merril Stern
- Music by: Michael Small
- Distributed by: Mars Film
- Release date: September 9, 1998
- Running time: 97 minutes
- Country: United States
- Language: English

Into My Heart is a 1998 American drama film starring Rob Morrow and Claire Forlani. It documents a love triangle involving a woman and two childhood friends, focusing on the themes of marriage, adultery and betrayal. It was written and directed by Anthony Stark and Sean Smith.

== Plot ==
Ben and Adam are best friends from childhood. While Adam marries Nina after college, Ben, after a number of unsuccessful relationships, marries Kat. Ben and Nina start an adulterous relationship. When Adam learns of Nina’s affair with Ben, he jumps from a tower, which results in him landing in a coma. Five years later, Ben notices Nina in a restaurant and approaches her. It is revealed that Nina has moved to London, re-married, and has a child now. Ben and Kat have separated and Kat is going to marry someone else. Adam is presumably dead.

== Release ==
The film premiered at the Venice Film Festival on September 9, 1998.

== Cast ==
- Rob Morrow as Ben
- Claire Forlani as Nina
- Jake Weber as Adam
- Jayne Brook as Kat
- Sebastian Roche as Chris
- Nora Ariffin as The Waitress
