= Inevitable Alien Nation =

Studio album by Keoki
- Released: March 24, 1998
- Genre: Techno, dance, house
- Label: Moonshine Music

Keoki chronology
Ego Trip (1997)	Inevitable Alien Nation (1998)	Altered Ego Trip (1998)

Inevitable Alien Nation is the second album by Keoki released in 1998.

== Track listing ==
1. Coldcut feat. Jello Biafra - "Every Home A Prison"
2. Rainbow Bridge - "For Miles"
3. Dimension 23 - "I.M.O.K.R.U.O.K."
4. Rumpus - "Space Funk (The Caterpillar)"
5. Naked Funk - "Pleasing The Korean"
6. Kung Plao Chicken - "Rock the Peter Lao"
7. Minty - "Useless Man"
8. Spiritual Being - "Dansa"
9. Southside Reverb - "Go Get It On" (Original)
10. Junkie XL - "No Remorse"
11. Junkie XL - "X-Panding Limits"
12. DVUS - "Infectuation"
13. The Avenging Godfathers Of Disco - "Boogie Joint [King-size Mix]"
14. Beyond & Back - "You Only Live Twice"
15. Ed The Red - "Lady Electronica [Electronic Mix]"
16. Space Invaders - "-3:04.20"
