= Sebastian Roché =

French actor (born 1964)

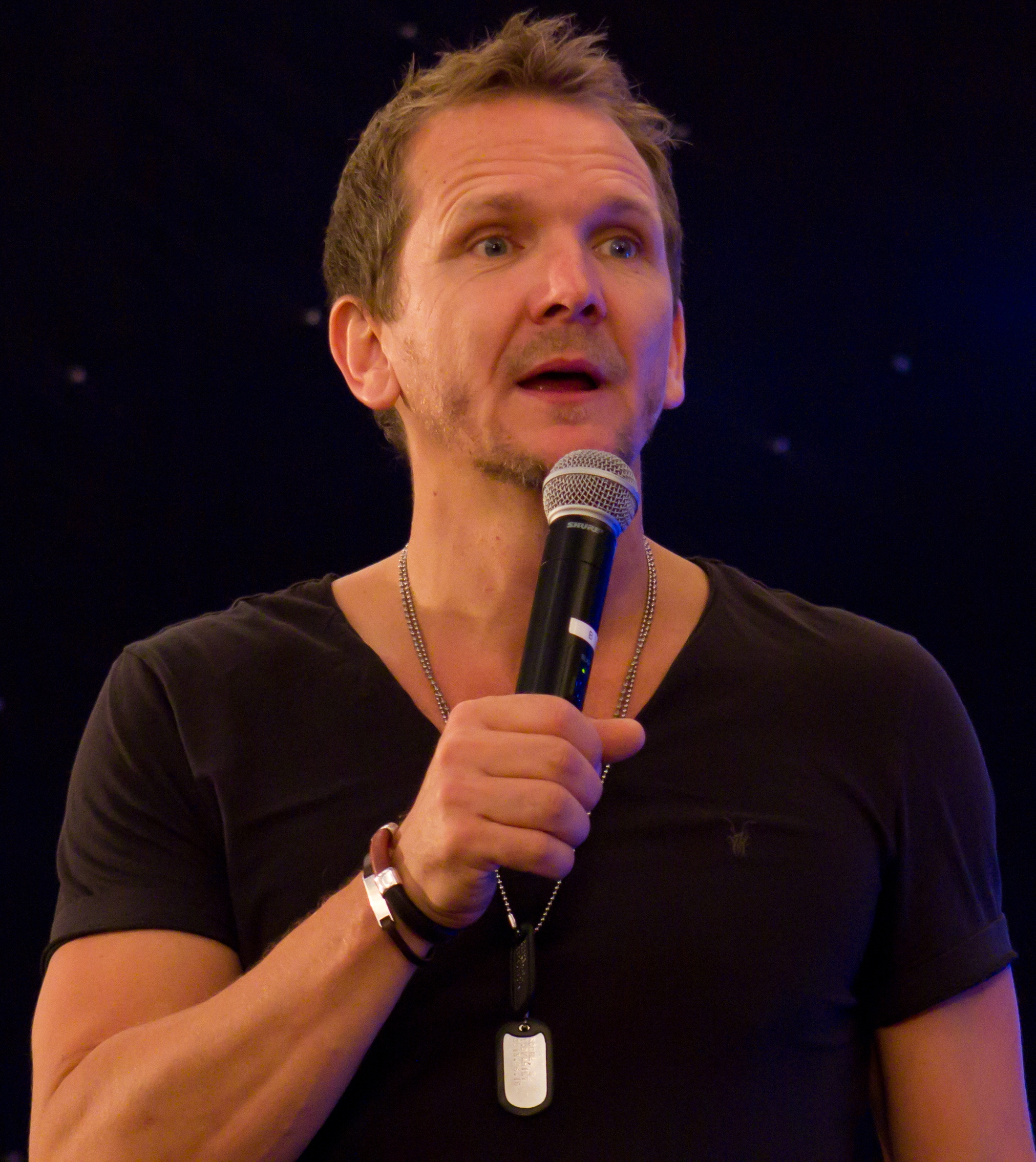
- Roché in 2013
- Born: 4 August 1964 (age 62); Paris, France
- Education: French National Academy of Dramatic Arts
- Occupation: Actor
- Years active: 1986–present
- Spouses: Vera Farmiga (m. 1997; div. 2004) Alicia Hannah-Kim (m. 2014)

Sebastian Roché (born 4 August 1964) is a French actor. He is known for his roles as Kurt Mendel in Odyssey 5, Jerry Jacks in General Hospital, Thomas Jerome Newton in Fringe, Balthazar in Supernatural, Mikael in both The Vampire Diaries and The Originals, and Reichsminister Martin Heusmann in The Man in the High Castle.

Roché has appeared in the films The Last of the Mohicans (1992); The Peacemaker (1997); 15 Minutes (2001); Earthsea (miniseries) (2004); Sorry, Haters (2005); The Namesake (2006); New York City Serenade (2007); Beowulf (2007); Happy Tears (2009); Safe House (2012); Wer (2013); A Walk Among the Tombstones (2014); and We Love You, Sally Carmichael! (2017). He also starred in the Broadway plays Salome (1992) and The Green Bird (2000).

== Early life ==
Roché was born in Paris to a Scottish mother, Gail (née Stewart), and a French father, Philippe Roché. From age 12 to 18, Roché lived on a sailboat with his parents and brothers, travelling to the Mediterranean, Africa, South America, and the Caribbean. He is fluent in French, English, German, Spanish and Italian.

Roché was educated at the Lycée International de St Germain en Laye. He then studied acting at the Cours Florent in Paris and the École Nationale Supérieure des Arts et Techniques du Théâtre, and also attended the prestigious French National Academy of Dramatic Arts or CNSAD, from which he graduated in 1989. He moved to New York City in 1992.

== Career ==
Roché began his acting career in the made-for-television film The Murders in the Rue Morgue, appearing opposite Ian McShane and Val Kilmer, which aired on CBS on 7 December 1986. Throughout the late 1980s, he had roles in French television and cinema, including the films Adieu je t'aime (1988), La Queue de la comète (1988), La Révolution française (1989), and A Woman's Revenge (1990), and the television series Bonjour maître (1987) and The Hitchhiker (1989–1991).

Roché also has an extensive classical theatre background, notably starring in Salome (1992) with Al Pacino at the Circle in the Square Theatre; Titus Andronicus (1994) with the Theatre for a New Audience, directed by Julie Taymor; Macbeth (1994) at the Classic Stage Company, directed by Jack Stehlin; and Arms and the Man (1995) in Hartford, Connecticut, directed by Mark Lamos. He appeared in a supporting role in the Daniel Day-Lewis-starring historical epic The Last of the Mohicans, which was released in the United States on 25 September 1992. On American television, he appeared in Loving (1992), South Beach (1993), New York Undercover (1996), Swift Justice (1996), and Liberty! (1997).

In 1997, Roché was part of the main cast in the Fox fantasy adventure series Roar, playing the role of Saint Longinus. He starred opposite Heath Ledger and Vera Farmiga. The series was cancelled due to low ratings later that same year. Roché's many 1990s television credits include recurring and guest starring stints in series such as Feds (1997), Dellaventura (1997), Sex and the City (1998), Merlin (1998), Law & Order (1993 & 1999), and Big Apple (2001). In 1998, he returned to the stage in the Off-Broadway production of Trainspotting at the Players Theater. In 2000, he portrayed Prince Renzo in the Broadway production of The Green Bird at the Cort Theatre. The play marked his second collaboration with director Julie Taymor. That same year, he appeared in the television film The Crossing opposite Jeff Daniels, which aired on A&E on 10 January 2000. He also had a minor role in the thriller film 15 Minutes starring Robert De Niro, released on 9 March 2001.

In 2002, Roché began portraying Kurt Mendel in the Canadian science fiction series Odyssey 5 for Showtime. He remained in the role until the show's cancellation a year later. In the pilot episode, he spoke French. He also guest starred in episodes of Touching Evil (2004), Charmed (2005), Alias (2005), CSI: Crime Scene Investigation (2005), and The Unit (2006). Roché then co-starred in the Mira Nair-directed drama film The Namesake, released on 9 March 2007, and in the Darby Crash biopic What We Do Is Secret, released on 8 August 2008. He subsequently co-starred with Freddie Prinze, Jr. the comedy-drama New York City Serenade, which premiered at the Toronto International Film Festival on 13 September 2007.

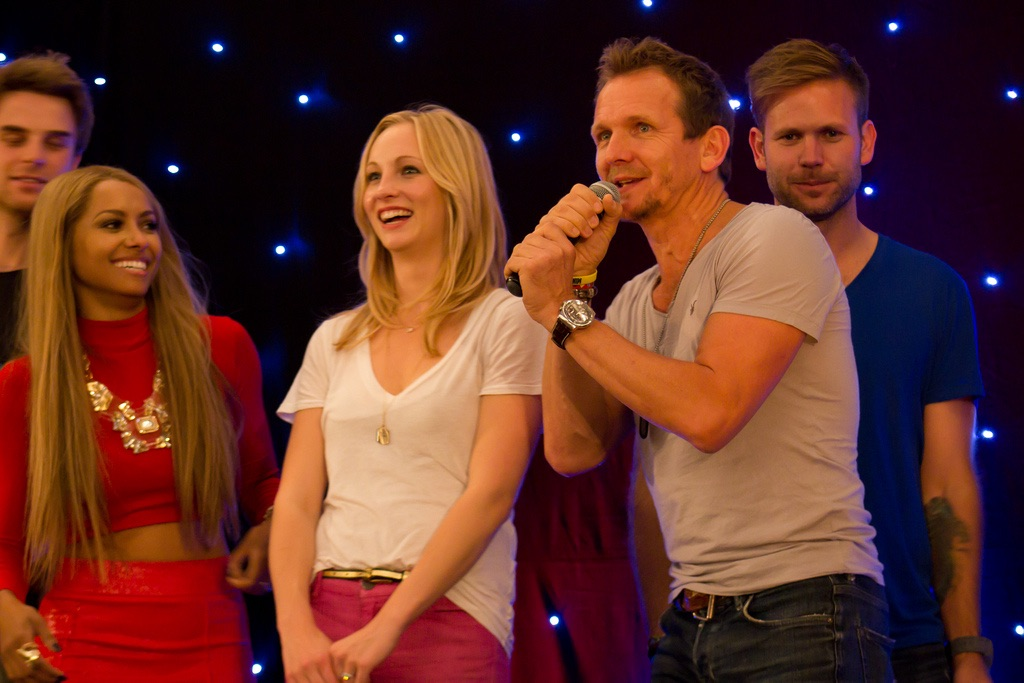
Roché with the cast of The Vampire Diaries in June 2013

Roché next starred in the motion capture epic fantasy film Beowulf, alongside Anthony Hopkins and Angelina Jolie, which was directed by Robert Zemeckis and released to cinemas on 16 November 2007. He reprised his role as Wulfgar from the film in the accompanying video game Beowulf: The Game, released on 13 November 2007. In 2007, Roché began appearing in the ABC soap opera General Hospital as terrorist/criminal Jerry Jacks . Roché returned to the series in a recurring capacity. He starred in a total of 319 episodes, and has spoken Russian, Spanish, and French in the series.

In 2009, Roché guest starred in The Mentalist as Shirali Arlov, and as John Quinn in both 24: Redemption (2008), and the 2009 season of 24. He then appeared in the comedy-drama film Happy Tears with Demi Moore and Parker Posey, released on 19 February 2010, and lent his voice to the animated film The Adventures of Tintin, directed by Steven Spielberg and released on 21 December 2011. In 2010, Roché joined the recurring cast of The CW's drama series Supernatural. He starred in six episodes of the sixth season as Balthazar, a rogue angel and longtime friend of fellow angel Castiel. He was next cast in the Fox science fiction drama series Fringe, recurring in the second and third seasons as Thomas Jerome Newton, the leader of an army of shapeshifters from a parallel universe and a main antagonist of the series.

In 2011, Roché began recurring as Mikael, the father of the Original Vampires, in The CW's supernatural drama series The Vampire Diaries. He then recurred as Clyde Easter in the CBS procedural crime drama series Criminal Minds. Roché next had a supporting role in the action-thriller film Safe House, starring Ryan Reynolds and Denzel Washington, which was released on 10 February 2012. Also in 2012, he made a guest appearance in NBC's procedural fantasy drama series Grimm. In 2013, he made a guest appearance on Burn Notice playing Roger Steele. He then starred in William Brent Bell's horror film Wer, released first in Japan on 16 November 2013.

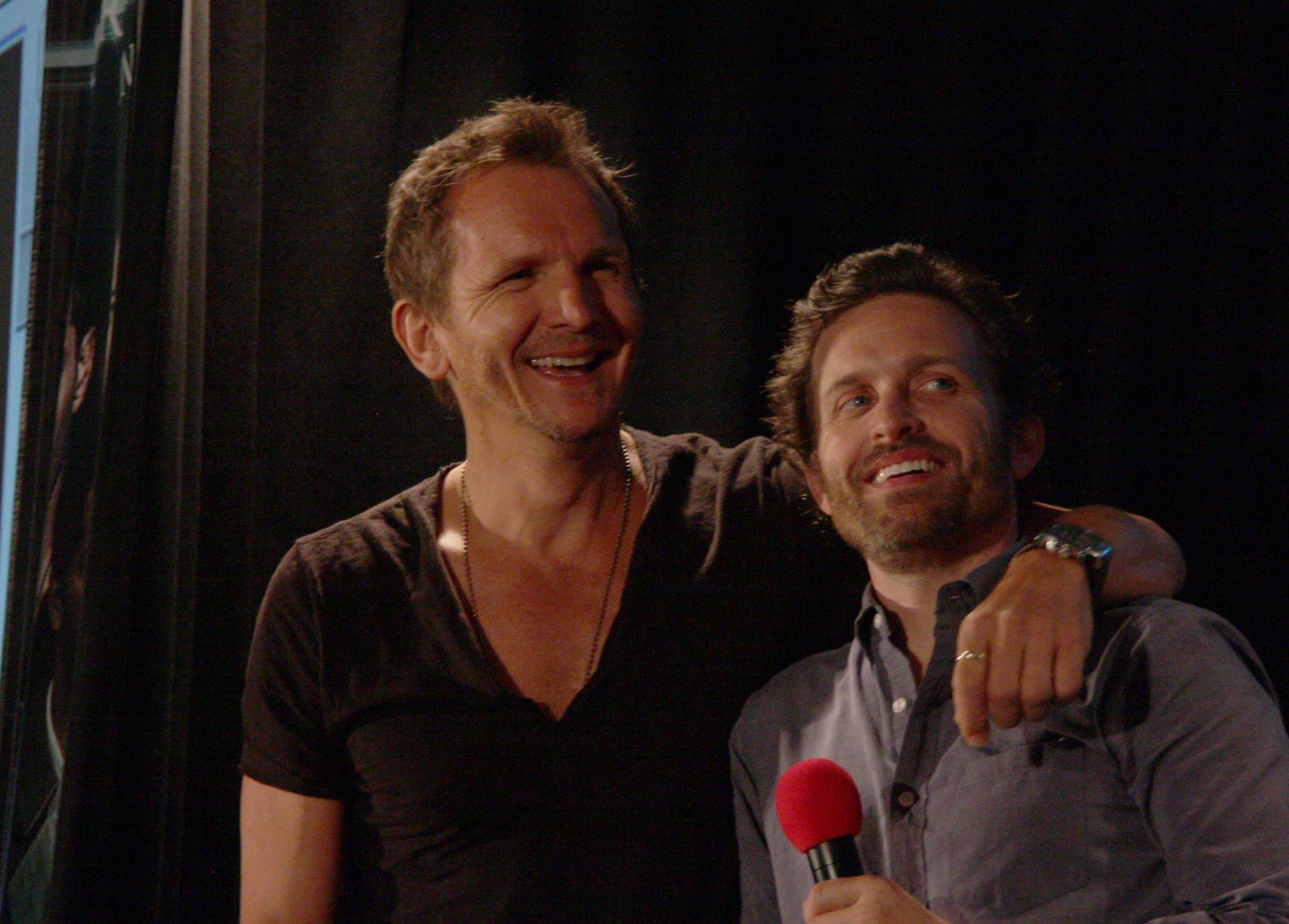
Roché with Rob Benedict at the Supernatural Convention in May 2014

From 2014 to 2015, and continuing through 2018, Roché reprised his role as Mikael in The Vampire Diaries spin-off series, The Originals. Roché then starred in the American crime thriller film A Walk Among the Tombstones alongside Liam Neeson, released on 19 September 2014. In March 2014, he joined ABC's political drama series Scandal in a recurring capacity. In December 2014, it was announced that Roché would guest star in season four of ABC's fairy tale drama series Once Upon a Time as King Stefan. Roché starred as Pierre Curie in an episode of the documentary miniseries The Mystery of Matter: Search for the Elements, which aired on PBS on 19 August 2015. Roché then guest starred in season seven of CBS' procedural drama series NCIS: Los Angeles, as Lee Ashman.

In 2016, Roché co-starred as Cardinal Michel Marivaux in Paolo Sorrentino's drama series The Young Pope, alongside Jude Law and James Cromwell. He also had a starring role in the second and third season of Amazon Video's drama series The Man in the High Castle as Martin Heusmann, the estranged Nazi father of main character Joe Blake (Luke Kleintank). Roché co-starred in Christopher Gorham's directorial debut comedy We Love You, Sally Carmichael! (2017), portraying film star Perry Quinn, alongside Gorham and Bitsie Tulloch. He then appeared as Emile Gilot, the father of French painter Françoise Gilot, in the second season of the National Geographic anthology series Genius. Roché performed in a modern-day adaptation of the Molière play Tartuffe, making his West End theatre debut as Orgon. He portrayed Klaus Jager in the war film Burning at Both Ends, opposite Cary Elwes and Judd Hirsch. He appeared in Tides directed by Tim Felhbaum opposite Iain Glen and Nora Arnezeder as well as the Michael Bay film 6 Underground with Ryan Reynolds for Netflix. He recurred as Dr. Ethan Campbell in the CW series Batwoman. He also guest starred as Hannibal Teague in the series MacGyver in 2020.

By 2021, he was recurring in both the NBC sci fi drama Debris as the enigmatic MI6 agent Brill and in the ABC drama Big Sky as the corrupt Sheriff John Wagy.

He appeared in Heatwave opposite Kat Graham, and the independent film Lone Star Bull as Chuck Moore. Roché also shot the NBC pilot Getaway and can also be seen in Guillermo del Toro's Cabinet of Curiosities as Roland, opposite Tim Blake-Nelson.

In the Paramount+ TV series 1923, the sequel to Taylor Sheridan's critically acclaimed 1883, he appears as Father Renaud, a French Roman Catholic priest and the abusive headmaster of the Catholic boarding school.

Roché appeared opposite Kim Soo-Hyun and Kim Ji-Won in the highest rated K-drama of 2024, Queen of Tears as Dr Liam Braun.

Roché was cast as a series regular in the new Netflix series Gringo Hunters set in Mexico.

== Personal life ==
Roché met American actress Vera Farmiga while co-starring with her in the Fox series Roar. They eloped to the Bahamas after the series ended in 1997, and lived on a 125-acre estate in Upstate New York. After seven years of marriage, Roché and Farmiga separated in 2004.

On 31 May 2014, he married Korean-Australian actress Alicia Hannah-Kim at the Chateau Les Bouysses in Mercuès, France.

Roché is an American citizen.
