= Beejoir =

Contemporary artist and curator, born in England and based in Asia

Beejoir (born 1979) is a contemporary artist, curator and co-founder of Souled Out Studios UK and Japan with Jon Michael Vogel. Born in England, Beejoir is now permanently based in Asia.

== Artwork ==
With a body of works spanning fine painting, stencils and spray paint, print and sculpture; Beejoir creates satirical pieces commenting on vice, popular culture, super brands and consumerism. Popular works include the LV Child, A Pill a Day, Money Trap and Immodium

With a background rooted in Graffiti, Beejoirs conceptual works generated international attention when in 2007, auction sales at Bonhams and Phillips secured his place in the interested circles of Contemporary Art

Financial Times editor Rachel Spence described Beejoirs work as 'irreverent' in response to his 2013 installation 'Saatchi and Saatchi', an old-fashioned Punch and Judy theatre on display at Londons Moniker Arts Fair

Beejoir's first major solo show took place in Thailand, December 2015 at BANGKOK CITYCITY GALLERY. #NRCSSM featured his Weapon of Choice installation as well as his oversized gold panels parodying mythology and consumer culture

In January 2018, under the direction of his Bangkok-based studio Souled Out Studios he curated the exhibition SOS, a 15-year celebration of their activity with the team at BANGKOK CITYCITY GALLERY. The immersive display was an exploration of social, environmental and economic crises from 10 local and international artists including Alex face, AMP, Candice Tripp, Gong, Gus, Jace, Lucas Price, Mau Mau and Muebon

In October 2018 Souled Out Studios was selected to participate in the first year of the Bangkok Art Biennale

Beejoir has exhibited worldwide, with 3 shows in Tokyo Japan, USA London and Asia having curated is as many countries through independent projects and Souled Out Studios with his arsenal of artists including Mau Mau, Alexface and Bon.

== Other projects ==
Featured in the 2007 Documentary Bomb it 2 by Director Jon Reiss Marketed as going "where no graffiti documentary had gone before", Bomb it 2 followed Graffiti artists from Australia, Asia and the middle East in a follow-up on the groundbreaking documentary Bomb it.

Executive Producer of the Documentary Dirty White Gold. based on 300,000 Indian farmers who killed themselves to escape debt, Dirty White gold was a feature-length production calling for transparency and reform in the fashion industries

Featured in numerous publications for his contribution to the arts including Beyond the Street: The 100 leading figures in Urban Art.
