= Gramaphone Records =

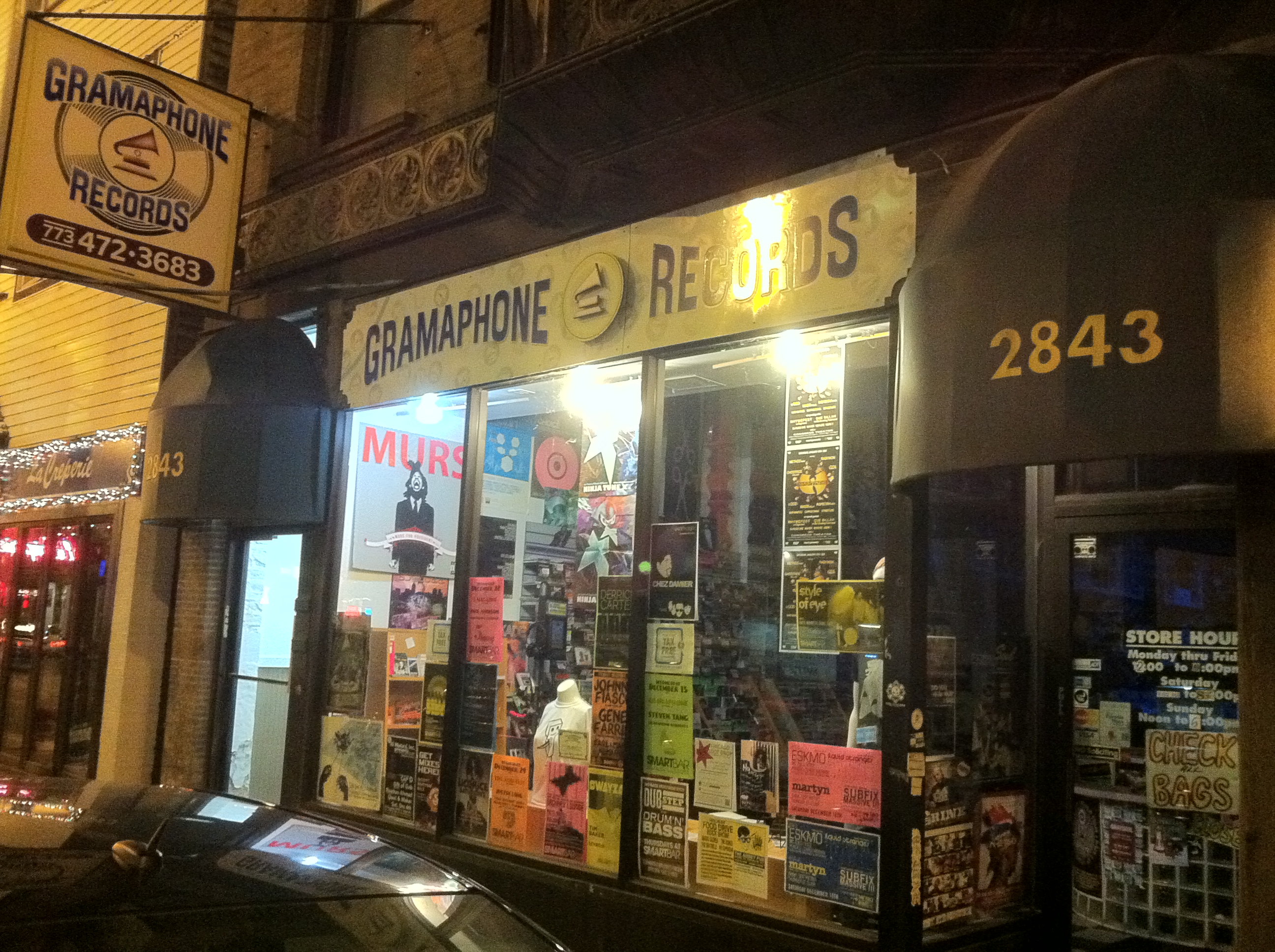
The store in 2010

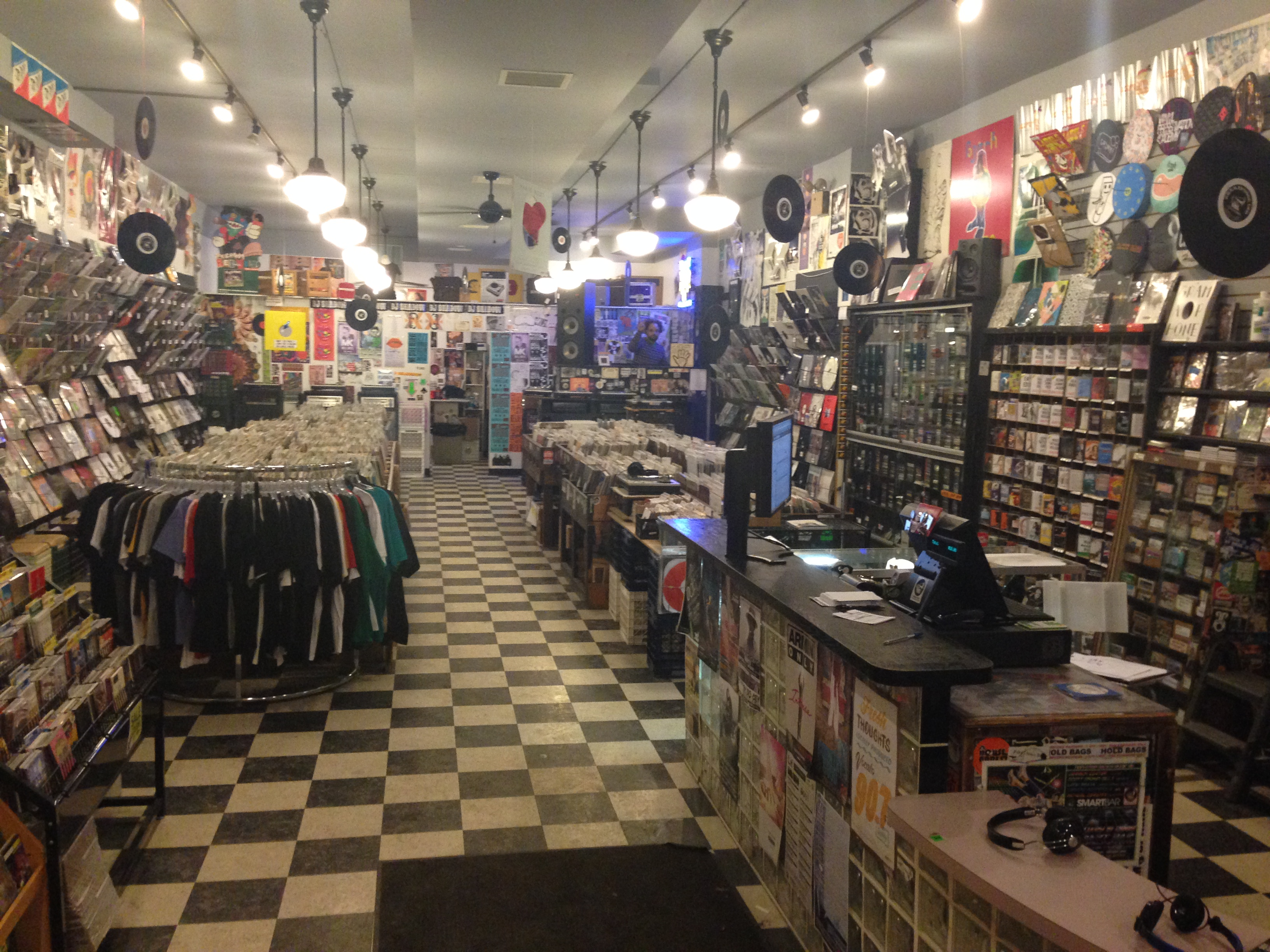
interior of the store in 2014

Gramaphone Records in 2003

Gramaphone Records is a DJ-based vinyl record store in Chicago, Illinois.

== History ==
The store opened in 1969 and originally sold folk, jazz, and blues music. By the 1980s, the store was selling house music records. The store was the first of its kind in the Chicago area, focusing on vinyl for DJs, and since has become a destination point for traveling DJs. The store focuses on stocking house, techno and electronic music and has been important in the promotion of Chicago house music. It is currently owned by DJ Michael Serafini.

== In film ==
The store has been featured in the documentary Better Living Through Circuitry.

== Notable customers and employees ==
- Kaskade
- DJ Sneak
- Cajmere
- Mark Farina
- Derrick Carter
- DJ Colette
- DJ Heather
