= Cleopatra's Second Husband =

- Directed by: Jon Reiss
- Starring: Radha Mitchell, Paul Hipp, Bitty Schram, Boyd Kestner
- Distributed by: Cucoloris Films, Flying Cow Productions
- Release date: 1998
- Running time: 92 minutes
- Country: United States
- Language: English

Cleopatra's Second Husband is a 1998 American psychological drama film written, produced and directed by Jon Reiss.

== Plot ==
Paul Hipp (The Funeral) and Bitty Schram (Kissing a Fool) play Robert and Hallie Marrs, a young LA couple, who go on vacation, leaving their house in the hands of strangers. They return to find their fish as dead as the plants, everything in disarray, and housesitters, clad in the couple's clothes, refusing to leave. Zack (Boyd Kestner) and Sophie (Radha Mitchell), the charismatic house sitting couple, soon infuse the repressed Robert with their erotically perverse irresponsibility. Robert, browbeaten and seemingly devoid of personality (with even his sex life regulated by his domineering wife's ovulation cycle), is easily seduced by the sexy Sophie. When Hallie discovers the dalliance and leaves, Robert literally becomes the couples slave. He gives them control of his home, his credit cards, practically his entire identity, until one day, driven to the darkest edge of his psyche, he snaps. Partially inspired by a true incident, this gripping thriller is equal parts black comedy and psychological power play. The film's title "Cleopatra's Second Husband," derives from Hallie and Robert's relationship which is a parallel to that of Cleopatra and Marc Antony.

== Release ==
The film was screened at Cinequest Film & Creativity Festival, Los Angeles Independent Film Festival, Seattle International Film Festival, Montreal World Film Festival, Hamptons International Film Festival, São Paulo International Film Festival, Chicago Underground Film Festival and the Bangkok Film Festival (now the Bangkok International Film Festival)
