= The Art of Murder =

1999 American-Canadian thriller television film

- Genre: Thriller
- Written by: Sean Smith; Anthony Stark
- Directed by: Ruben Preuss
- Starring: Michael Moriarty; Joanna Pacula; Boyd Kestner; Peter Onorati
- Theme music composer: Ross Vannelli
- Countries of origin: United States; Canada
- Original language: English

Production
- Executive producers: Michael Frislev; Larry Gershman; Kevin Goetz; Chad Oakes
- Producers: Greg Malcolm; Vicki Sotheran
- Cinematography: John P. Tarver
- Editor: Dona Noga
- Running time: 100 minutes

Original release
- Release: December 14, 1999

The Art of Murder is a 1999 American-Canadian thriller television film that first aired on network television on December 14, 1999. It stars Michael Moriarty, Joanna Pacula, Boyd Kestner and Peter Onorati.

== Plot ==
Elizabeth Sheridan, a painter, is married to Cole, who runs a yacht-building company. When Cole becomes abusive, Elizabeth begins an affair with Tony Blanchard, the firm's top designer. When a blackmailer produces incriminating pictures of her and Tony, she and Tony agree to pay, but when murder gets added to the mix, she becomes the obvious suspect.

== Cast ==
- Michael Moriarty as Cole Sheridan
- Joanna Pacula as Elizabeth Sheridan
- Boyd Kestner as Tony Blanchard
- Peter Onorati as Willie Kassel
- Nathaniel Deveaux as Sheriff Powers Crawford
- Kathryn Anderson as Tina
- Betty Linde as Ora Mae Howell
- Mark Brandon as Ken Lothrop
- Thomas Miller as Tommy Lothrop
- Jaclynn Grad as Casey McHugh
- John Nelson as Trooper
- John Tierney as Burton Hiasen
- Kim Stern as Waitress

== Reception ==
In a review for Radio Times, David Parkinson said in regards of Joanna Pacula's appearance in the film, "Ever since she hit Hollywood in 1983's Gorky Park, Polish-born Joanna Pacula has been slowly sliding down the rankings. This is a pity, as she's an incredibly physical actress in every sense of the word. She certainly deserves better than this tepid thriller." Parkinson summarized the film's plot as "There's a couple of twists that just about pass muster. But whether you'll consider them worth waiting for, after an interminably slow opening, is debatable."
