= Electric Skychurch =

American electronic/acid trance band

Electric Skychurch is an electronic or acid trance band based in Los Angeles, California. It was formed in 1991 by composer and producer James Lumb, who initially involved vocalist Roxanne Morganstern and percussionist Alex Spurkel in the project. Over time, Electric Skychurch has also included such musicians as Leigh Gorman of Bow Wow Wow. The band has worked with record labels such as Los Angeles–based electronic music label Moonshine Music.

The single "Together" from the EP of the same name was their best-charting hit, reaching No. 1 on the College Music Journal RPM dance chart. The band is one of the featured artists in the documentary film Better Living Through Circuitry.

Member David de Laski went on to form the music project Lord Runningclam.

== Discography ==
- Knowoneness (1995)
- Together (EP) (1996)
- Sonic Diary (2001)
- Sonic Diary Singles (2006)
