= Mitchell Lichtenstein =

American actor (born 1956)

- Born: Mitchell Wilson Lichtenstein; March 10, 1956 (age 70)
- Education: Bennington College (BA); Yale University (MFA)
- Occupation: Actor
- Father: Roy Lichtenstein

Mitchell Wilson Lichtenstein (born March 10, 1956) is an American actor, writer, producer, and director.

== Early life and education ==
The son of Isabel (née Wilson) and Roy Lichtenstein, he studied acting at Bennington College in Vermont. His father is of Jewish background.

== Career ==
Mitchell's first film role was in the 1983 film Lords of Discipline, filmed largely at Wellington College in the UK. In Ang Lee's film The Wedding Banquet (1993), Lichtenstein played the partner of a gay Taiwanese man living in the United States who is forced to marry by his parents. Other film acting credits include Streamers, for which he and other members of the cast Guy Boyd, George Dzundza, David Alan Grier, Matthew Modine and Michael Wright were awarded the Volpi Cup for Best Actor from the Venice Film Festival.

He produced, wrote, and directed the 2007 black comedy horror film Teeth, about the pitfalls and power of a girl as a living example of the vagina dentata myth. The film premiered at the 2007 Sundance Film Festival to positive reviews.

His film Happy Tears premiered at the Berlin International Film Festival in 2009. His film Angelica was selected to be screened in the Panorama section of the 65th Berlin International Film Festival.

== Filmography ==
=== Film ===
Year	Title	Director	Producer	Writer
2007	Teeth	Yes	Yes	Yes
2009	Happy Tears	Yes	Yes	Yes
2015	Angelica	Yes	Yes	Yes

Acting roles

Year	Title	Role
1983	The Lords of Discipline	Tradd St. Croix
1983	Streamers	Richie
1984	Crackers	Artiste
1993	The Wedding Banquet	Simon
1995	Kangaroo Man	Dr. Peter Briggs
1996	Ratchet	Tim Greenleaf
1999	Flawless	Gay Republican Spokesperson

=== Television ===
Acting roles

Year	Title	Role	Notes
1984	Miami Vice	Mark Jr. TJ	Episode: "Little Prince"
1987	The Equalizer	Alex Hayes	Episode: "Coal Black Soul"
1990	Blue Bayou	Martin Vernet	Television film
1993	Cheers	Waiter	Episode: "One for the Road"
1993	As the World Turns	Gill	Recurring 1992-93
1995, 1998	Law & Order	Joe Gibb /Eddie Chandler	2 episodes
1998	Homicide: Life on the Street	Adam / David Ralston	Episode: "Brotherly Love"
