= We Love You, Sally Carmichael! =

- Theatrical release poster
- Directed by: Christopher Gorham
- Written by: Daryn Tufts
- Produced by: Adam Abel
- Starring: Christopher Gorham; Bitsie Tulloch; Sebastian Roché; Jack McBrayer; Paula Marshall; David Nibley; Andie Nibley
- Cinematography: Ryan Little
- Edited by: S. Mckay Stevens
- Music by: Christian Davis
- Production companies: Go Films; Flinch Films
- Distributed by: Purdie Distribution
- Release date: August 4, 2017 (United States)
- Country: United States
- Language: English

We Love You, Sally Carmichael! is a 2017 American comedy film directed by Christopher Gorham in his feature film directorial debut. Written by Daryn Tufts, it stars Gorham, Bitsie Tulloch, Sebastian Roché, Jack McBrayer, Paula Marshall, David Nibley, and Andie Nibley.

Principal photography began in June 2016. The film was released in the United States on August 4, 2017, by Purdie Distribution.

== Cast ==
- Christopher Gorham as Simon Hayes
- Bitsie Tulloch as Tess Perkins
- Sebastian Roché as Perry Quinn
- Andie Nibley as Andie Perkins
- Jack McBrayer as Darren
- Paula Marshall as Diane
- David Nibley as Brad King
- Alicia Hannah as Alex
- Felicia Day as Sarah
- Perez Hilton as himself
