= The Mystery of Matter =

- DVD cover
- Genre: Documentary film
- Created by: Stephen Lyons
- Written by: Stephen Lyons
- Directed by: Stephen Lyons; Muffie Meyer
- Narrated by: Michael Emerson
- Theme music composer: Tom Phillips
- Country of origin: United States
- Original language: English
- No. of episodes: Three one-hour episodes

Production
- Producers: Stephen Lyons; Moreno/Lyons Productions LLC; Oregon Public Broadcasting
- Cinematography: Gary Henoch
- Editor: Raoul Rosenberg
- Running time: 3 h (180 min)

Original release
- Network: PBS
- Release: October 20, 2014

The Mystery of Matter: Search for the Elements is a 2014 American documentary miniseries, which premiered nationwide on August 19, 2015. The PBS documentary, in three-episodes of one hour each, was directed by Stephen Lyons and Muffie Meyer.

The series, which took ten years to make, describes the search for the basic chemical elements that form matter by focusing on the lives and times of seven scientific visionaries. Hosted by actor Michael Emerson, the series depicts the creative process of the scientists, with actors describing the process of discovery in the scientists' own words and reenacting their major discoveries using replicas of their original laboratory equipment.

== Episodes ==
| No. | Title | Original release date (nationwide) |
|---|---|---|
| 1 | "Out of Thin Air" (1754–1806) | August 19, 2015 |
Joseph Priestley and Antoine Lavoisier discover a new gas called oxygen, discrediting the basic theory of chemistry at the time, creating the basis for the modern science of chemistry, and prompting chemists all over the world to look for more new elements; Humphry Davy introduces audiences to nitrous oxide ("laughing gas") and uses electricity to search for new chemical elements.
| 2 | "Unruly Elements" (1859–1902) | August 19, 2015 |
Dmitri Mendeleev invents the periodic table, bringing order to the understanding of the elements for the first time; Marie Curie discovers several elements, including polonium and radium, and discovers radioactivity, demonstrating that elements can change identities and may consist of previously unsuspected subcomponents.
| 3 | "Into the Atom" (1910–1960) | August 19, 2015 |
Henry Moseley investigates atomic numbers and uncovers new details about the periodic table using X-ray spectroscopy; Glenn Seaborg creates plutonium, making nuclear weapons possible, and discovers related transuranium elements.

== Participants ==
The documentary is narrated by Michael Emerson and includes the following participants (alphabetized by last name):

- Matthew Amendt (actor)
- Michael Aronov (actor)
- Hugo Becker (actor)
- Ava Deluca-Verley (actress)
- Michael Emerson (narrator)
- Russell Egdell (chemist)
- Nick Gehlfuss (actor)
- John L. Heilbron (biographer)
- Roald Hoffmann (chemist)
- David Kaiser (physicist/historian)
- Paul Lyons (actor)
- Anthony Marble (actor)
- Seymour Mauskopf (historian)
- Patrick Page (actor)
- Gregory Petsko (chemist)
- Lawrence M. Principe (chemist/historian)
- Sebastian Roché (actor)
- Alan Rocke (historian)
- Juliet Rylance (actress)
- Eric Scerri (chemist)
- Neil Todd (Manchester University)

== Gallery ==
=== The seven featured scientists ===
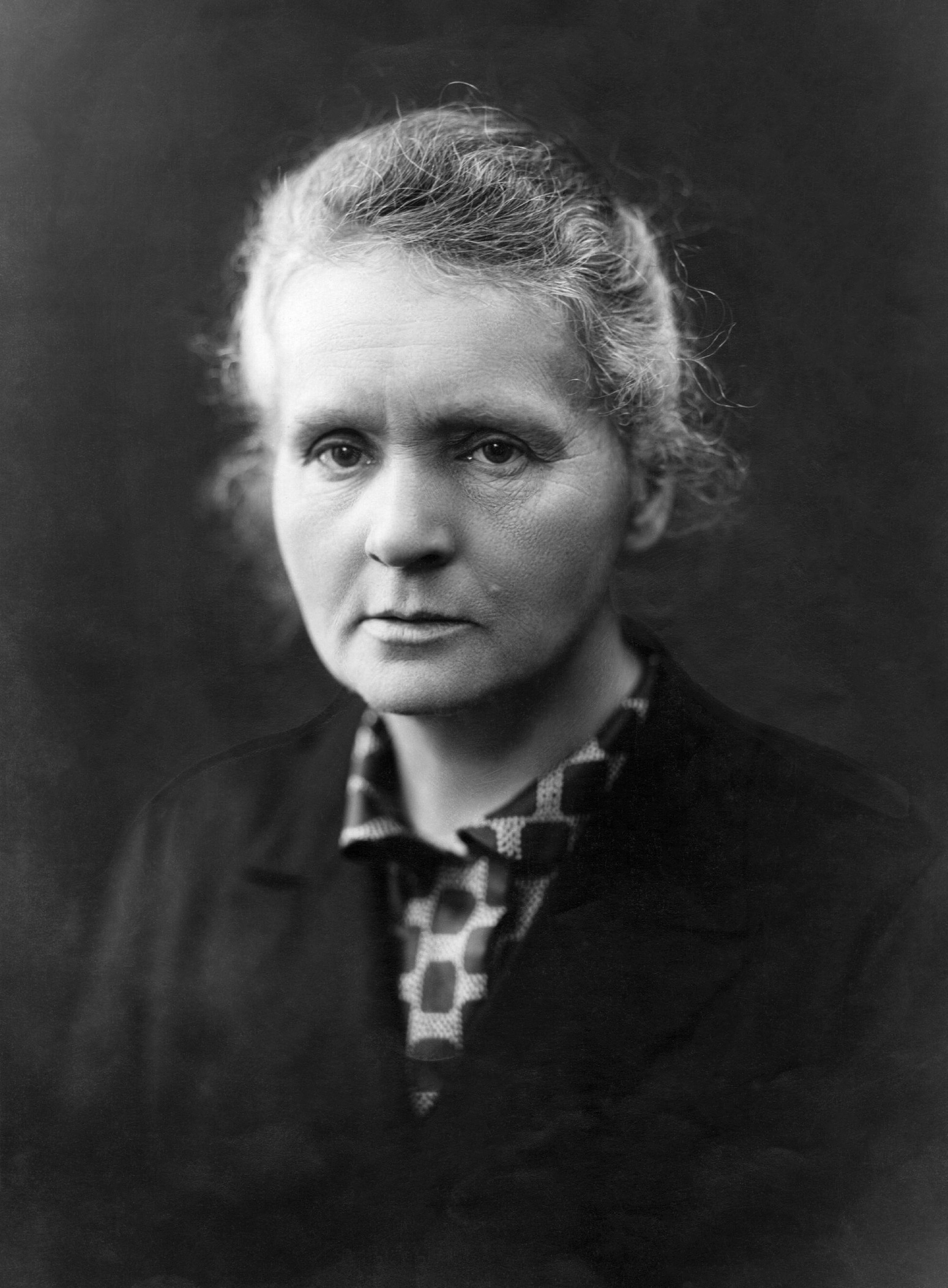
Marie Curie

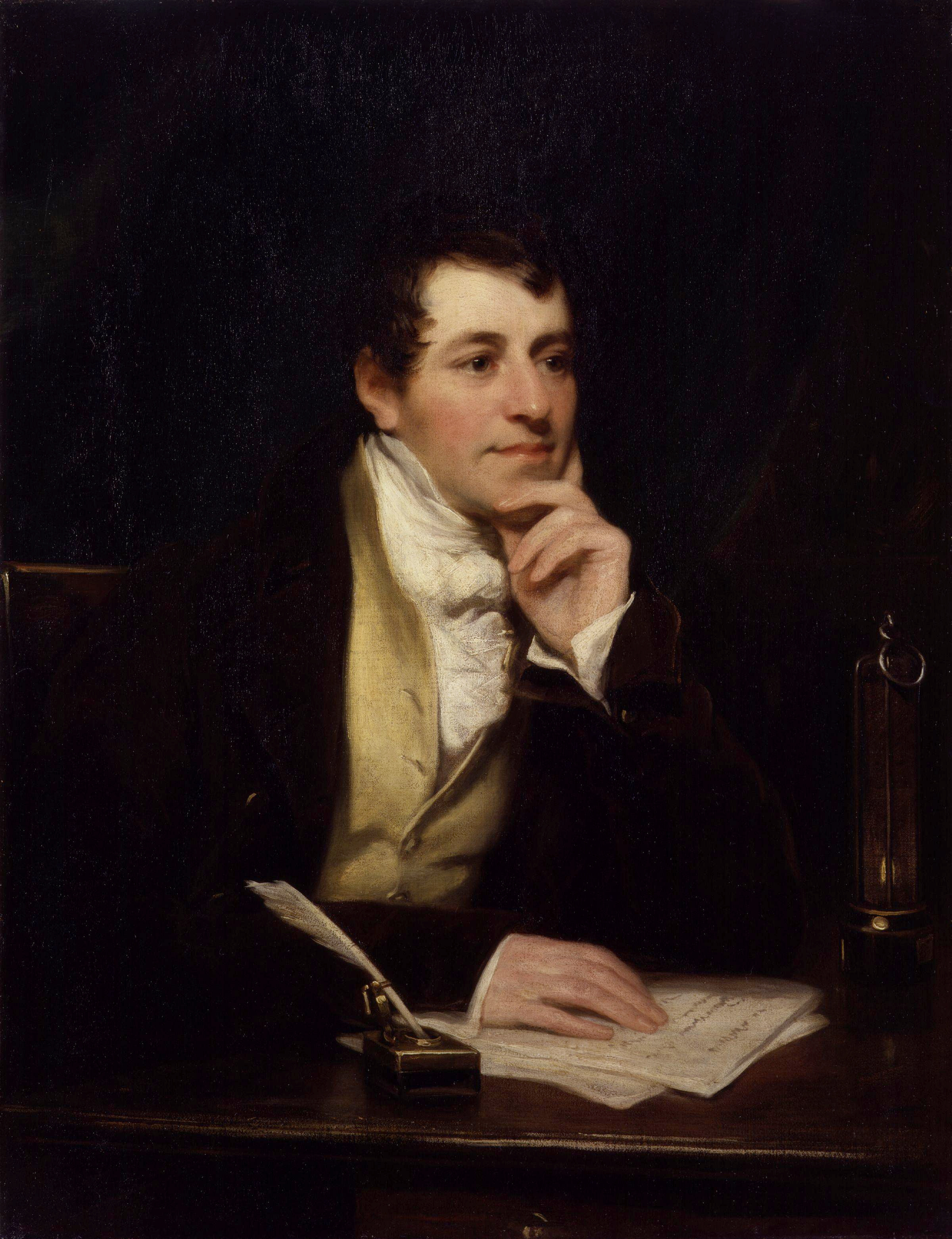
Humphry Davy

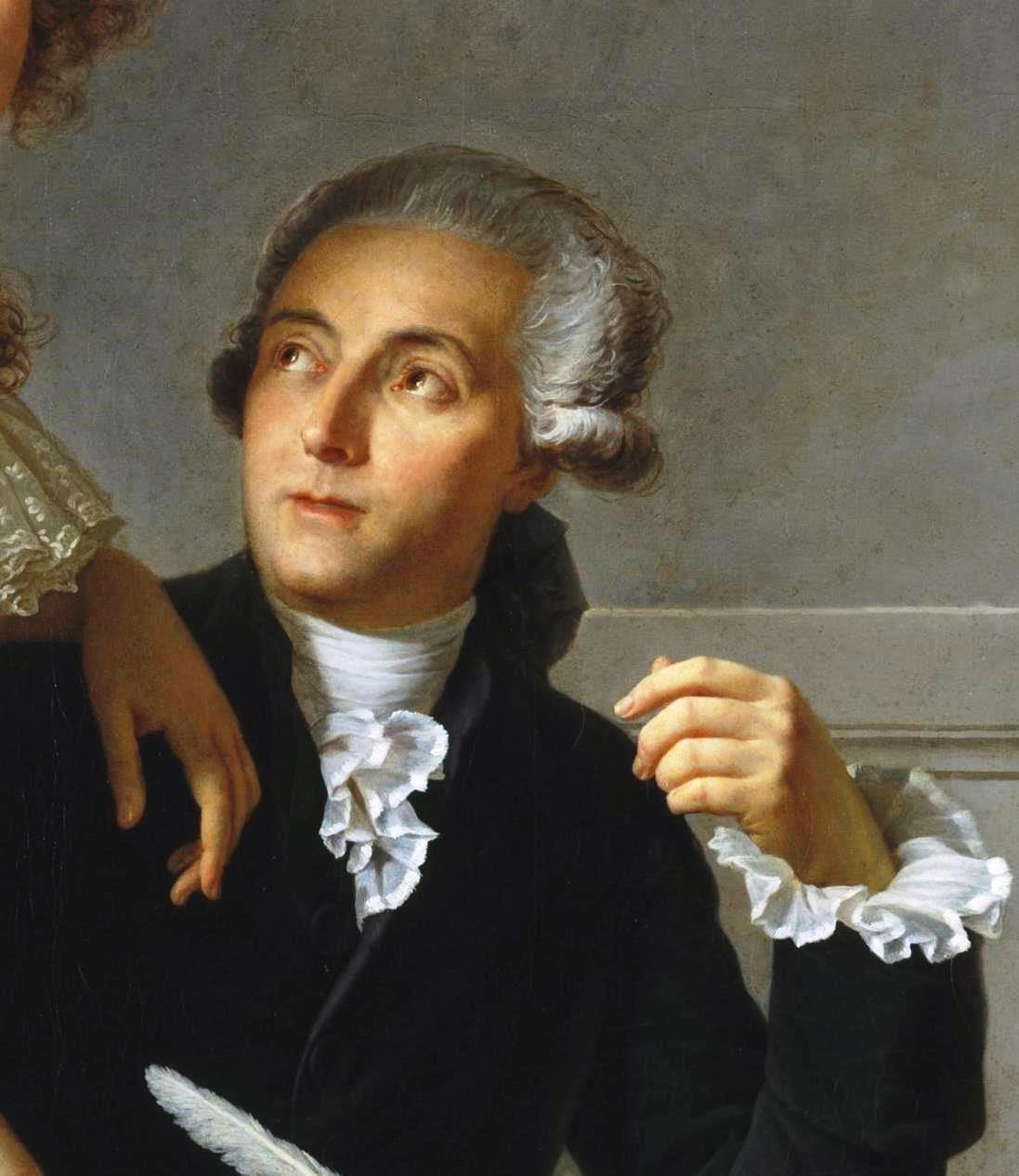
Antoine Lavoisier

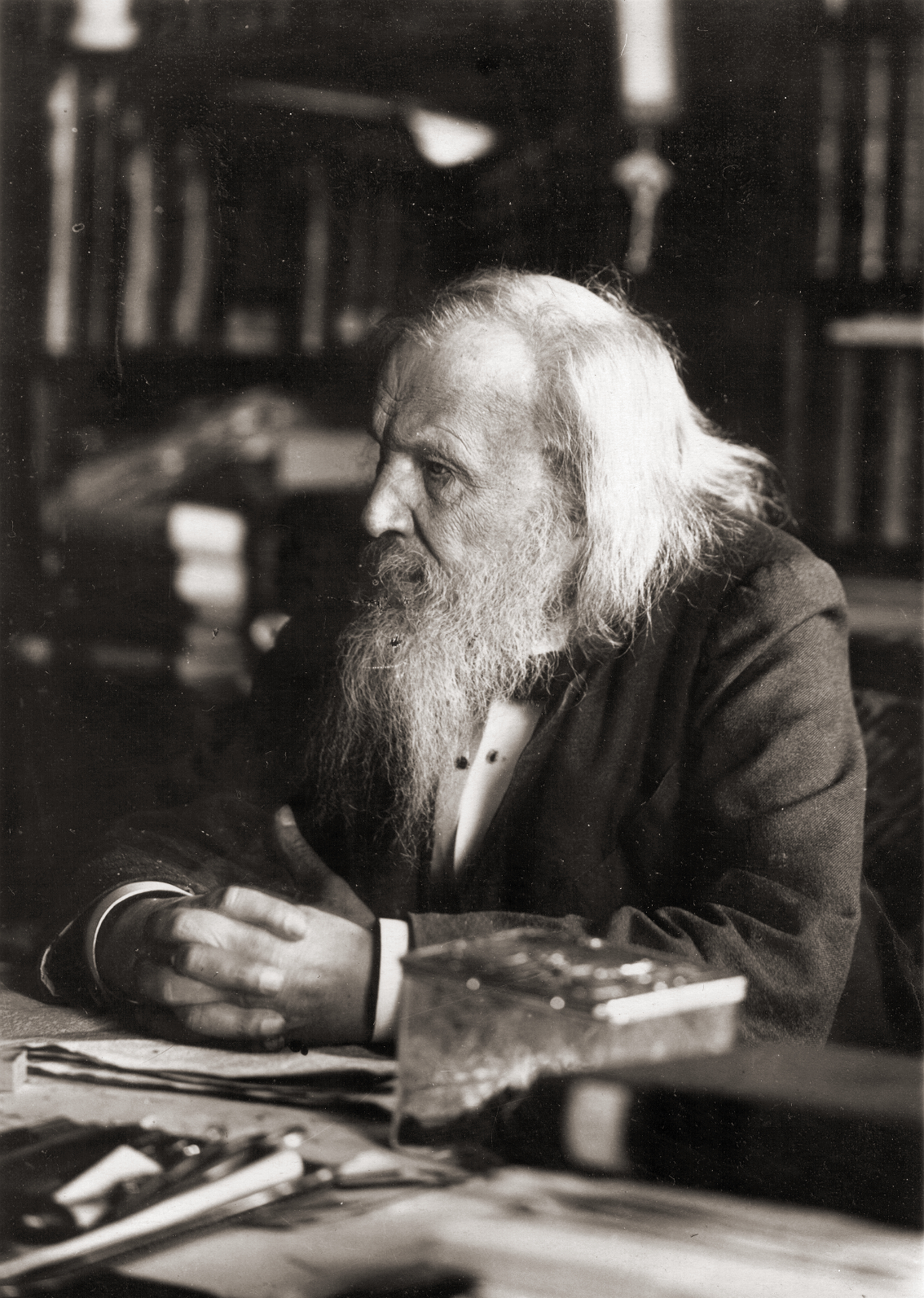
Dmitri Mendeleev
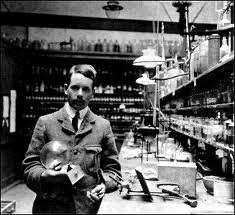
Henry Moseley

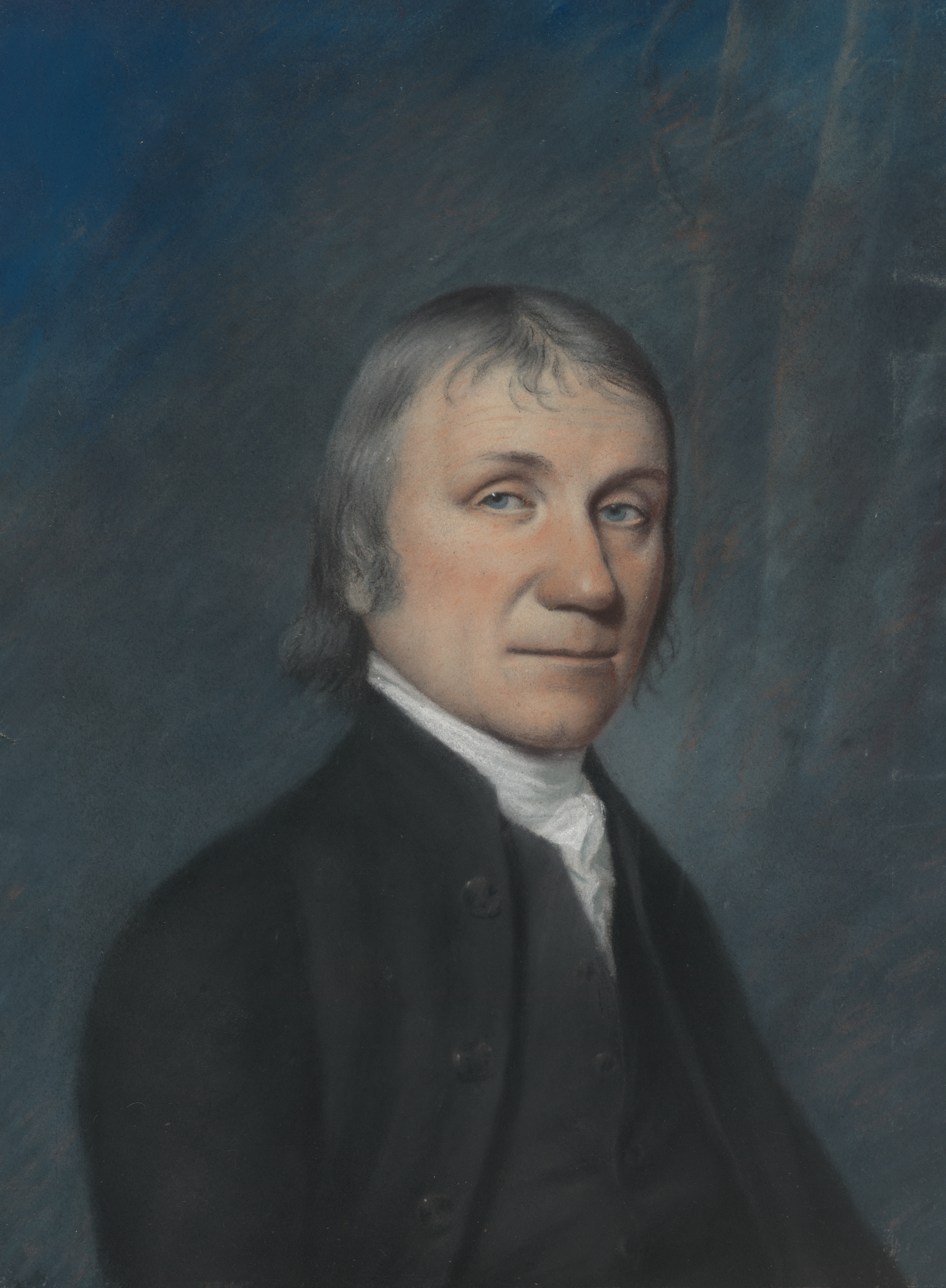
Joseph Priestley

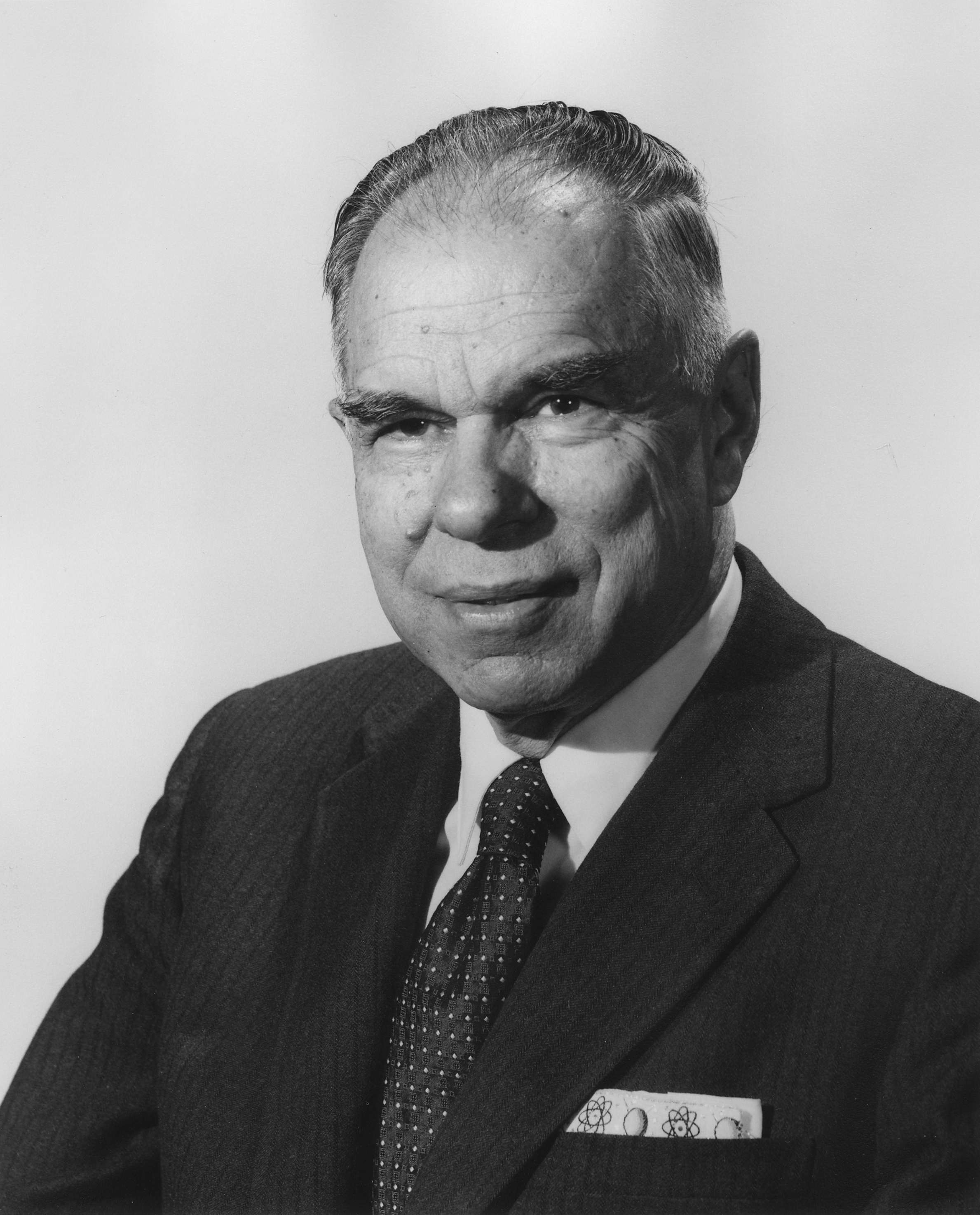
Glenn Seaborg

=== Cast and advisors ===
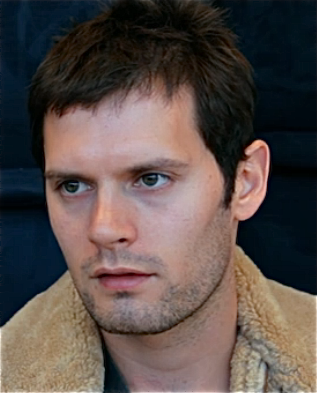
Hugo Becker

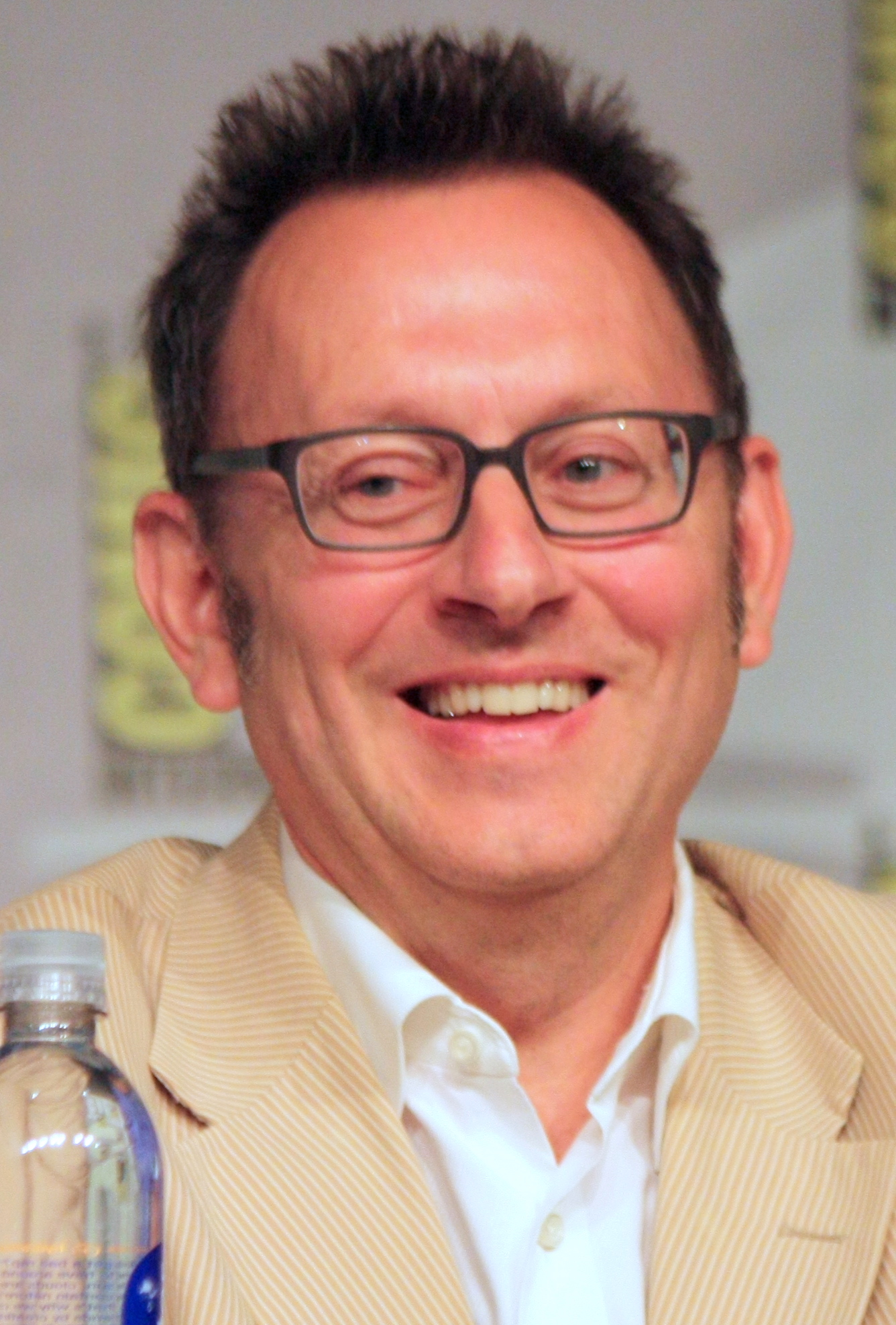
Michael Emerson

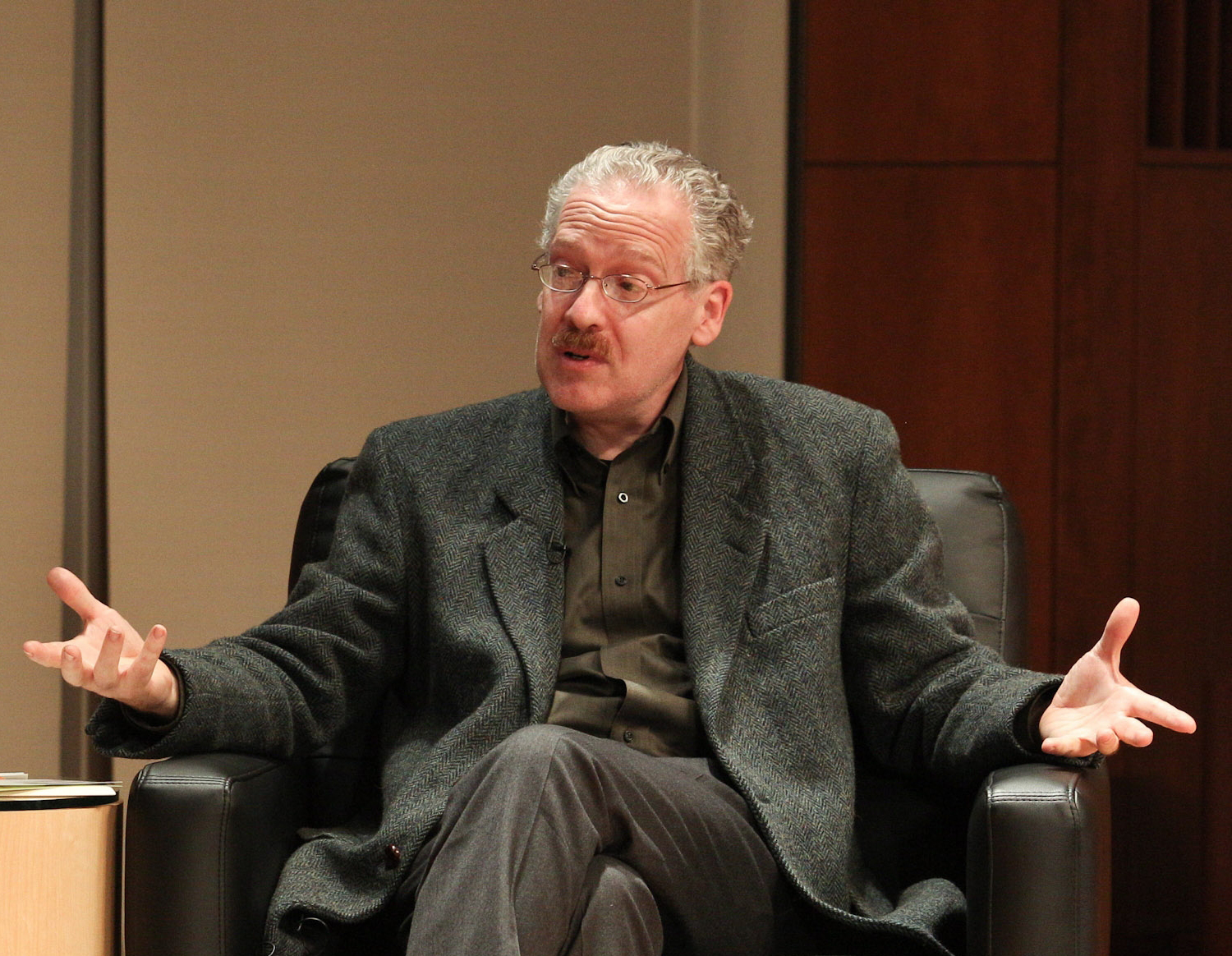
Lawrence M. Principe

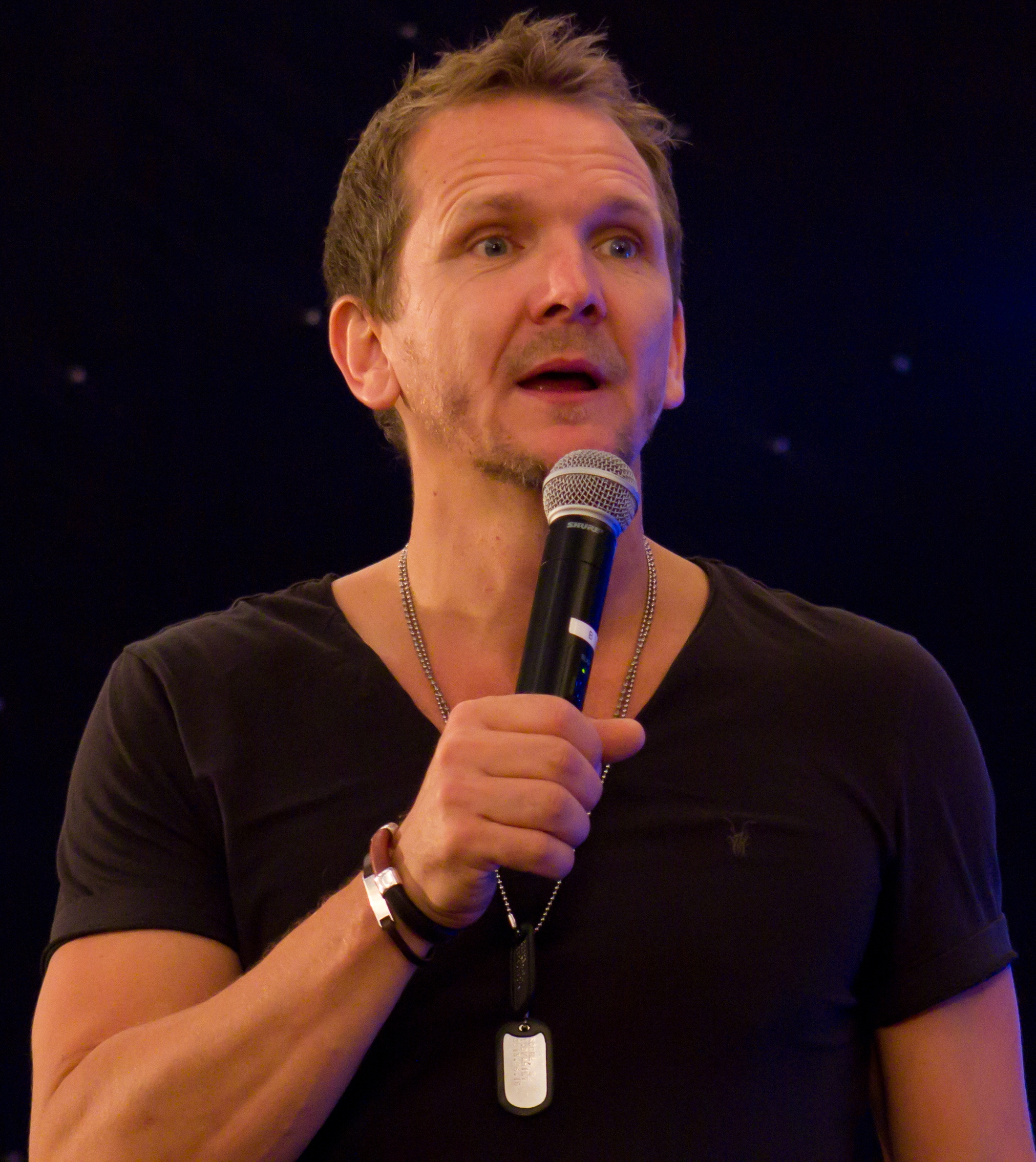
Sebastian Roché

== Reviews and criticism ==
According to Carman Drahl of Forbes magazine, "Chemists will quickly recognize the life stories of giants in their field. This show wasn’t designed just for chemists, however. The target audience includes teachers, students, and curious TV viewers." The series, based on a National Science Foundation project description, tells "a 'detective story' of chemistry, stretching from the ancient alchemists to today's efforts to find stable new forms of matter". Mark Dawidziak, of the Cleveland Plain Dealer, quotes the historical advisor, Alan Rocke: "[The series] portrays science as [a] very human process. People see it is a very mechanical process. A great humanity is revealed by these stories, but also the unfolding process of how science actually comes to these understandings of nature." Erica K. Jacobsen, of the Chemical Education Division of the American Chemical Society, found the series to be "an excellent tool for bringing students a different view of the periodic table and those involved in its history".

== See also ==
- Atom
- Chemical element
- Electron
- History of chemistry
- History of the periodic table
- Neutron
- Proton
- Search for the Super Battery (2017 PBS film)
