= A Woman's Revenge (1990 film) =

1990 film

- Directed by: Jacques Doillon
- Written by: Jacques Doillon; Jean-François Goyet; Fyodor Dostoyevsky
- Produced by: Alain Sarde
- Starring: Isabelle Huppert
- Cinematography: Patrick Blossier
- Edited by: Catherine Quesemand
- Distributed by: AMLF
- Release date: 10 January 1990
- Running time: 133 minutes
- Country: France
- Language: French
- Box office: $1.4 million

A Woman's Revenge (French: La vengeance d'une femme) is a 1990 French drama film directed by Jacques Doillon and starring Isabelle Huppert. It is based on the novel The Eternal Husband by Fyodor Dostoevsky. It was entered into the 40th Berlin International Film Festival.

== Cast ==
- Isabelle Huppert as Cécile
- Béatrice Dalle as Suzy
- Jean-Louis Murat as Stéphane
- Laurence Côte as Laurence
- Sebastian Roché as Le dealer
- David Léotard as Le jeune homme
- Albert Le Prince as Le médecin (as Albert Leprince)
- Brigitte Marvine as La danseuse
- Pierre Amzallag as Le voisin
- Jean-Pierre Bamberger as La présence
