= Happy Tears =

- Theatrical release poster
- Directed by: Mitchell Lichtenstein
- Written by: Mitchell Lichtenstein
- Produced by: Joyce M. Pierpoline
- Starring: Parker Posey; Demi Moore; Rip Torn; Billy Magnussen; Sebastian Roché; Ellen Barkin
- Cinematography: Jamie Anderson
- Edited by: Joe Landauer
- Music by: Robert Miller
- Distributed by: Roadside Attractions
- Release dates: February 11, 2009 (Berlin Film Festival); February 19, 2010 (United States)
- Running time: 95 minutes
- Country: United States
- Language: English
- Box office: $22,464

Happy Tears is a 2009 American independent comedy-drama film by Mitchell Lichtenstein. It stars Parker Posey, Demi Moore, Rip Torn, Sebastian Roché, Ellen Barkin, and Billy Magnussen. The film premiered at the Berlin International Film Festival on February 11, 2009. and was released theatrically in the United States on February 19, 2010.

== Plot ==
Jayne and Laura play sisters helping their crude but endearing father Joe deal with age-related health and mental problems. Wealthy by marriage, Jayne is otherwise psychologically fragile. Conversely, Laura has her hands full with domestic responsibilities but is considerably more grounded. Upon returning to their childhood home to help their father, they face difficult, frequently comic situations. The home, their deceased mother's effects, and their father's eccentricities evoke memories and sentiments, especially for Jayne. The sisters bicker over the seriousness of their father's condition. They also contend with a romantic dalliance between Joe and his equally eccentric, wigged-out "nurse" Shelly. The struggle to balance familial duties with their own strained lives suggests a more meaningful family connection they may not have had as children.

== Cast ==
- Parker Posey as Jayne
  - Julianna and Jacquelyn Conforti as Young Jayne
- Demi Moore as Laura
  - Alyssa Klein as Young Laura
- Rip Torn as Joe
- Sebastian Roché as Laurent
- Ellen Barkin as Shelly
- Christian Camargo as Jackson
- Victor Slezak as Eli Bell
- David L. King as Dr. Sims
- Aldous Davidson as Waiter
- Richard Barlow as Mitch
- Billy Magnussen as Ray
  - Anderson Folsom as Young Ray
- Susan Blommaert as Mallory
- Suzanne Inman as Nurse
- Celia Weston as Neighbor
- Tom McNutt as Neighbor
- Marilyn Yoblick as Yard Sale Woman
- Roger Rees as Antiques Dealer
- Benjamin Brandreth as Ben

== Production ==
The shooting schedule was completed in 2008 and included locations in and around Philadelphia including Prospect Park, Center City and Cabrini College.

== Reception ==
On review aggregator website Rotten Tomatoes, the film holds a 29% score based on 34 reviews, with an average rating of 4.4/10. The site's consensus states: "Replete with quirky indie clichés, Happy Tears wastes some fine performances from Demi Moore, Parker Posey, and Rip Torn on stale formula". On Metacritic, the film has a weighted average score of 35 out of a 100 based on 17 critics, indicating "generally unfavorable" reviews.

Noel Murray of The A.V. Club described Happy Tears as "a complete mess of a movie", but also mentioning that "Lichtenstein conjures some sweet moments and striking metaphors".

Michael Phillips of the Chicago Tribune wrote that "[the film] settles for the usual moments, even at its quirkiest".

In an interview for The New York Times, Manohla Dargis said that "writer and director Mitchell Lichtenstein struggles to find the humor in a host of horrors".

According to Leslie Felperin of Variety magazine, the film is "a contradictory creature, both insightful and dumb".

Slant Magazine's Nick Schager gave the film a half star explaining his reasoning for it as "[Happy Tears] succeeds only at suggesting the incompatibility of returning-home dramedy and surrealistic flights of fancy". David Fear of Time Out managed to give a film at least one star, writing "Not even the reliable Posey can salvage this slag heap".

Melissa Anderson of The Village Voice wrote "Other than the guest-starring appearance of Cy Twombly canvases, nothing distinguishes this poor relation of The Savages from all the other emotionally fraudulent Amerindies about familial dysfunction and reconciliation".

Despite all the negative criticism of the film, Roger Ebert of the Chicago Sun-Times praised the film, calling Demi Moore's role as "kind of calm", "attractive", as well as "dialed-down" and "capable woman".
