= Burning at Both Ends (film) =

- Release poster
- Directed by: Matthew Hill; Landon Johnson
- Screenplay by: Matthew Hill; Landon Johnson
- Story by: Matthew Hill; Jonah M. Hirsch; Landon Johnson
- Starring: Cary Elwes; Jason Patric; Greer Grammer; Sebastian Roché; Judd Hirsch; Mira Furlan; Gilles Marini
- Cinematography: Spencer Hutchins
- Edited by: Dan Wilken
- Music by: John W. Snyder
- Production company: Slingshot Productions
- Distributed by: Signature Entertainment
- Release date: January 10, 2022
- Running time: 111 minutes
- Country: United States
- Language: English

Burning at Both Ends (also known as Resistance 1942 in some territories) is a 2022 film set in Nazi occupied Vichy France, starring Cary Elwes, Jason Patric, Greer Grammer, Sebastian Roché and Judd Hirsch.

== Plot ==
Resistance 1942 is a historical drama that tells the story of Jacques, a man who broadcasts messages of hope and resistance to the citizens of France during the Nazi occupation in 1942. As the Gestapo searches for him, Jacques and his daughter Juliette find help from Andre, a Swiss banker, who risks his life to aid them. The movie depicts the power of ordinary people to effect positive change in times of despair.

== Cast ==
- Cary Elwes as Jacques Christoffersen
- Jason Patric as Andre Eerikäinen
- Greer Grammer as Juliet
- Sebastian Roché as Klaus Jager
- Judd Hirsch as Bertrand
- Gilles Marini as Inspector Gerald Rousseau
- Mira Furlan as Agnes
- Don Harvey as Freidrich

== Production ==
The script was prize winning at the Movieguide Awards in 2014. Elwes was originally announced be to starring alongside Matthew Modine when the production was revealed by Slingshot Productions in Los Angeles in March 2017, with filming expected to begin that spring. Judd Hirsch and Greer Grammar were also cast in March 2017. As of 2025, the IATSE Union crew members who participated on this project have still not been paid for their time committed to this production. The project went through arbitration with IATSE and lost, prior to release.

== Release ==
The picture was made available for digital download in the UK from January 10, 2022.

== Reception ==
In a review entitled "Jason Patric smuggles quality into worthy war tale", The Guardian said the film had "the kernel of a good idea" but the "timid film fails to fully capitalise on [the] uncomfortable scenario and misses opportunities elsewhere, instead going big on self-satisfied pieties about fighting the just fight." The performance of Patric as the morally ambiguous Andre is praised compared to Elwes "oddly detached" performance.

== Accolades ==
The film was awarded the Best Movie for Mature Audiences prize at the 2023 MovieGuide Awards.
