= 15 Minutes =

2001 film by John Herzfeld

- Theatrical release poster
- Directed by: John Herzfeld
- Written by: John Herzfeld
- Produced by: Keith Addis; David Blocker; John Herzfeld; Nick Wechsler
- Starring: Robert De Niro; Edward Burns; Kelsey Grammer; Avery Brooks; Melina Kanakaredes
- Cinematography: Jean-Yves Escoffier
- Edited by: Steven Cohen
- Music by: Anthony Marinelli; J. Peter Robinson
- Production companies: TriBeCa Productions; New Redemption Pictures
- Distributed by: New Line Cinema
- Release date: March 9, 2001
- Running time: 120 minutes
- Countries: United States; Germany
- Language: English
- Budget: $42 million
- Box office: $56.4 million

15 Minutes is a 2001 satirical buddy cop action thriller film directed and written by John Herzfeld and starring Robert De Niro and Edward Burns. Its story revolves around homicide detective Eddie Fleming (De Niro) and fire marshal Jordan Warsaw (Burns), who join forces to apprehend Emil Slovák and Oleg Razgul (Karel Roden and Oleg Taktarov), a pair of Eastern European murderers videotaping their crimes with hopes of becoming rich and famous. The title is a reference to the Andy Warhol quotation, "In the future, everyone will be world-famous for 15 minutes." 15 Minutes was produced by TriBeCa Productions and New Redemption Pictures and released by New Line Cinema overseas and Kinowelt Filmverleih in Germany on March 9, 2001. The film received negative reviews from critics and grossed $56.4 million against a $42 million budget.

== Plot ==
Ex-convicts Emil Slovák and Oleg Razgul arrive in the United States to claim their part of a bank heist in Eastern Europe. Oleg steals a video camera from an electronics store. At the rundown apartment of their old partner Milos Karlova, they are denied their share of the spoils, so Emil fatally stabs Milos and his wife Tamina as Oleg records it with the camera. Czech immigrant Daphne Handlova witnesses the murders from the bathroom but escapes before Emil and Oleg can kill her too. To hide the crime, Emil sets fire to the apartment.

Jordy Warsaw is a New York City arson investigator assigned to the case. Also at the scene is Eddie Flemming, a high-profile detective who is followed by his girlfriend Nicolette Karas, a reporter from the tabloid TV show Top Story. Flemming and Warsaw agree to work the case together. While checking out the crowd, Warsaw spots Daphne trying to get his attention, but she disappears. Meanwhile, Emil calls an escort service and asks for a "Czech girl". Oleg records Emil as he kills the escort Honey and learns the address of the escort service. Oleg continually films everything, claiming that he wants to be the next Frank Capra.

Flemming and Warsaw investigate Honey's murder and visit the escort service. The madam, Rose Hearn, tells them that the girl who Warsaw described does not work for her, but rather a hairdresser. She mentions a couple of other guys who had recently asked her the same questions. Flemming and Warsaw arrive at the hair salon after Emil and Oleg have warned Daphne to keep quiet. Flemming notices Oleg filming them from across the street. In the ensuing foot chase, Flemming's regular partner Leon Jackson is hit with a glass bottle, and his wallet and gun are stolen. Emil finds a card with Flemming's name and address. He becomes jealous of Flemming's celebrity status and is convinced that anyone in America can get away with anything.

On the night when Flemming plans to propose to Nicolette, Oleg and Emil sneak into his apartment and bind Flemming to a chair. While Oleg is recording, Emil explains that he plans to kill Flemming and sell the tape to Top Story. After getting himself committed to an insane asylum, Emil will declare that he is actually sane. Because he cannot be tried for the same crime twice, he will get away with it, collecting royalties from books and movies based on his crimes. Flemming attacks them with his chair (while still tied to it), but Emil gets the upper-hand and stabs him in the chest, mortally wounding him. Emil suffocates and kills Flemming with a pillow.

The city is in a state of mourning. Emil sells the videotape of Flemming's murder to Top Story anchor Robert Hawkins in exchange for $1 million, outraging Warsaw and the entire police force. Emil and Oleg watch the tape's broadcast on Top Story from inside a Planet Hollywood; customers realize that Emil and Oleg are sitting with them and panic. Police arrive and arrest Emil, while Oleg escapes.

Warsaw takes Emil to an abandoned warehouse to kill him, but police arrive in time and take Emil into custody. Everything goes as planned for Emil, now a celebrity who is pleading insanity. His lawyer, Bruce Cutler, agrees to work for 30% of the royalties that Emil will receive for his story. Meanwhile, in hiding, Oleg becomes jealous of the notoriety that Emil is receiving.

While Cutler is leading Emil away out of court to be transferred to a mental institution, Warsaw provokes an argument, with the Top Story crew recording it. Oleg quietly approaches Hawkins and hands to him the videotape of Emil explaining his plan to Flemming, proving that he was sane the whole time. Hawkins shouts to Emil about the evidence in his possession. Angry for not getting any praise, Oleg pulls a gun and opens fire at Emil, hitting only Cutler and a policeman. Emil grabs the policeman's gun, shoots and mortally wounds Oleg, and grabs Nicolette, threatening to kill her unless the police drop their weapons. Against orders, Warsaw shoots Emil a dozen times in the chest, killing him and avenging Flemming's murder. Hawkins rushes to Oleg's side as he dies. Afterward, Hawkins attempts to get a comment from Warsaw but punches him instead and walks away as a police smile with approval.

== Cast ==
- Robert De Niro as Detective Eddie Flemming
- Edward Burns as FDNY Fire Marshal Jordan Warsaw
- Kelsey Grammer as Robert Hawkins
- Avery Brooks as Detective Leon Jackson
- Melina Kanakaredes as Nicolette Karas
- Karel Roden as Emil Slovák
- Oleg Taktarov as Oleg Razgul
- Vera Farmiga as Daphne Handlova
- John DiResta as Bobby Korfin
- James Handy as Deputy Chief Declan Duffy
- Darius McCrary as Detective Tommy Cullen
- Bruce Cutler as himself
- Kim Cattrall as Cassandra
- Paul Herman as Detective Paulie
- David Alan Grier as The Mugger
- Vladimir Mashkov as Milos Karlova
- Irina Gasanova as Tamina Karlova
- Noelle Evans as "Honey"
- Tygh Runyan as Stephen Geller
- Ritchie Coster as News Stand Vendor
- Gabriel Casseus as Unique
- Anton Yelchin as Boy in the Burning Building
- Charlize Theron as Rose Hearn (uncredited)

== Production ==
The film was shot on location in New York City and Los Angeles from May to July 1999. It was originally slated to be released by New Line Cinema in spring 2000, with theatrical trailers appearing in late 1999. For reasons unknown, the film was pulled from the spring 2000 schedule and delayed until the following year, on March 9, 2001.

== Reception ==
=== Box office ===
The film grossed $24,403,552 domestically in the United States and Canada. It made an additional $31,956,428 internationally, for a worldwide total of $56,359,980, against a production budget of $42 million; it was a box-office bomb.

=== Critical response ===
Review aggregator website Rotten Tomatoes gives the film an approval rating of 32%, based on reviews from 123 critics, with an average rating of 4.42/10. The site's consensus reads: "As critical as it is about sensationalism in the media, 15 Minutes itself indulges in lurid violence, and its satire is too heavy-handed to be effective." It holds a 34 out of 100 rating on Metacritic, based on 32 critical reviews, indicating "generally unfavorable" reviews. Audiences polled by CinemaScore gave the film an average grade of "B−" on a scale of A+ to F.

Roger Ebert of the Chicago Sun-Times gave it three stars out of four, calling it "a cynical, savage satire about violence, the media and depravity". Ebert wrote, "It doesn't have the polish of Natural Born Killers or the wit of Wag the Dog, but it's a real movie, rough edges and all, and not another link from the sausage factory."

On the negative side, Stephen Hunter of The Washington Post wrote:

For a while, as long as it's cops vs. scum, 15 Minutes bangs along pretty spectacularly. The contrived script gets Brooks out of the picture fast, so that De Niro and Burns can have a nice male bonding moment or two, if that's the sort of thing that brings tears to your eyes. ... But like oh-so-many movies in today's film culture, where nobody ever met a story he could tell, this one becomes so jammed up with subplots it seems to run out of room, space and time. ... it ruins the movie, leaving it without its engine, without its rooting interest, without, really, much of anything going for it.

Owen Gleiberman of Entertainment Weekly stated: "At the movies, we're now bamboozled into expecting not drama but sensation, and so it's no surprise that the plot of a movie like 15 Minutes is less an end in itself than an excuse, a jumping-off point for showy, contrived, borderline-exploitation sequences that fail to tie together because they're not really there to do anything but sell themselves as money-shot thrills. ... 15 Minutes is a glum and sadistic mess."
