= Jon Reiss =

American film director

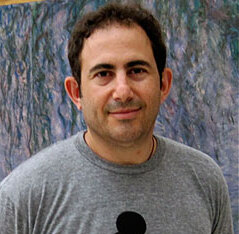
- Reiss in 2010
- Born: Jonathan Reiss; United States
- Occupations: Film director, producer, writer, teacher
- Years active: 1980–present

Jon Reiss is a film producer and director, and an author. He has made the feature film Cleopatra's Second Husband (1998) and the documentaries Better Living Through Circuitry (1999) and Bomb It (2007). He has directed music videos for artists, including Nine Inch Nails, Slayer, Danzig, and the Black Crowes.

== Career ==
=== Film ===
Originally from Los Gatos, Reiss studied economics at the University of California, Berkeley and earned a Master in Fine Arts in Film and Television Production at the University of California, Los Angeles.

He started working in film in 1981 with Target Video until 1983, where he worked on numerous documentaries about the West Coast punk scene, many of which were titled "Underground Forces". Bands and artists he documented include Black Flag, Dead Kennedys, Circle Jerks, T.S.O.L., Z'EV, Johanna Went, The Cramps and Iggy Pop. He traveled extensively in Europe screening the work and filming European punk rock bands in the early primitive years of video projection.

From 1983 to 1990 he made five documentaries about the performance group Survival Research Laboratories. He also wrote, produced and directed the short narrative film A Bitter Message of Hopeless Grief (1988) featuring the group's anthropomorphic robots. Baited Trap (1985) was Reiss' first short film narrative made during his first year at UCLA Film School.

In 1992 Reiss directed the music video for "Happiness in Slavery" by Nine Inch Nails, which included Bob Flanagan. It won awards at the Chicago International Film Festival, Golden Gate Competition at the San Francisco International Film Festival and was voted Top Ten by The Village Voice Critics Poll for Best Music Video. It was banned from MTV. He went on to direct music videos for Slayer, Danzig, The Black Crowes, Type O Negative, Kottonmouth Kings and others. In 1995 the Toronto International Film Festival curated a retrospective of his music videos.

In 1992 Reiss produced Love Is Like That, a feature drama starring Tom Sizemore, Pamela Gidley, Seymour Cassel, Richard Edson, Debi Mazar and Joe Dallesandro. His first feature-length film as director, Cleopatra's Second Husband (1998), is a psychological drama that won Best First Feature at Cinequest Film Festival.. His documentary feature about rave culture, Better Living Through Circuitry (1999) with Crystal Method, Roni Size and Moby, earned Reiss Best Documentary Director at Chicago Underground Film Festival.

Reiss was named one of "10 Digital Directors to Watch" by Daily Variety in 2000.

Bomb It (2007) is a feature documentary about graffiti and street art culture. It included Taki 183, Shepard Fairey, Os Gemeos, DAIM, Revok and others and was shot on location in New York, Philadelphia, London, Paris, Amsterdam, Hamburg, Barcelona, Berlin, Cape Town, São Paulo, Tokyo, and Los Angeles. IGN stated: "At the core of the film is a poignant social statement about public space and the war being waged for it." Bomb It premiered at the Tribeca Film Festival as an Official Selection. Bomb It 2 (2010) was commissioned as a Web series for the digital broadcast network Babelgum and expands the reach of Bomb It into Asia and South East Asia, the Middle East as well as Europe, the U.S. and Australia. Reiss traveled to Bangkok, Jakarta, Singapore, Hong Kong, Tel Aviv, Palestinian refugee camps on the West Bank, Perth, Melbourne, Copenhagen, Chicago and Austin. It includes the artists Ash, Phibs, Stormie Mills, Beejoir, and others.

Reiss has worked as a producer on the series In The Making for Firelight Media, as well as the documentaries The Good Breast, Sweetheart Dancers (for Showtime), and Desolation Center.

Additionally, he has conducted workshops and presentations around the world including Cannes, Sundance, SXSW, and Tribeca. As a consultant – through his company 8 Above – he has advised hundreds of filmmakers and film organizations on distribution strategies.

=== Writing ===
Based on his experience releasing Bomb It, using a hybrid distribution strategy including a do-it-yourself twenty city theatrical release, Reiss wrote his first book, Think Outside the Box Office: The Ultimate Guide to Film Distribution and Marketing for the Digital Era (2010) – a step-by-step guide addressing how filmmakers should approach distribution and marketing in today's extremely digitized world. Think Outside the Box Office contains the opinions, strategies and tactics of Peter Broderick, B-Side's Chris Hyams, Cinetic Rights Management's Matt Dentler, publicist Cynthia Swartz and filmmakers like Todd Sklar, Joe Swanberg and Cora Olson.

In 2011 Reiss released the book Selling Your Film Without Selling Your Soul, co-written with Sheri Candler and The Film Collaborative. The book includes case studies on independent film distribution.

In 2011 Reiss also contributed to the free ebook The Modern Moviemaking Movement.

==== Books ====
- Reiss, Jon (2009). Think Outside the Box Office: The Ultimate Guide to Film Distribution and Marketing for the Digital Era. Hybrid Cinema. ISBN 978-0982576205.
- The Guerilla Filmmakers Pocketbook (Contributor), 2010 ISBN 9781441180780
- Selling Your Film Without Selling Your Soul (with The Film Collaborative and Sheri Candler), 2011 ISBN 0983822956
- Selling Your Film Outside the U.S.: Digital Distribution in Europe (with The Film Collaborative and Sheri Candler), 2011
- The Modern MovieMaking Movement (Collaborator), 2011
- Webdocs – A Survival Guide for Online Filmmakers (Collaborator), 2011
- Blek le Rat: 30 Year Anniversary Retrospective (Collaborator), ISBN 9781935634058, 2011

=== Teaching ===
Reiss teaches in the Film Directing Program at California Institute of the Arts. He created the course "Real World Survival Skills: Everything I Wish I Had Been Taught in Film School" which covers the practical/business aspects of filmmaking from fundraising through distribution.

== Filmography ==
=== Feature length films and documentaries ===
- Love Is Like That (1991) – as producer
- Cleopatra's Second Husband (1998) – as writer, director, producer
- Better Living Through Circuitry (1999) – as director
- Bomb It (2007) – as director and producer
- Bomb It 2 (2010) – as director, producer, and DP
- The Good Breast (2016) – as producer
- Desolation Center (2018) – as consulting producer
- Sweetheart Dancers (2019) – as consulting producer (short)

=== Short film ===
- Baited Trap: a Tale of Meat, Torment and Murder (1985), 12 mins
- Bunky Echo-Hawk: The Resistance (2020) – as producer (short)
- A Bitter Message of Hopeless Grief (1988) – collaboration with Survival Research Laboratories as a producer, 13 mins

=== Films on Survival Research Laboratories ===
- A Scenic Harvest From The Kingdom of Pain (1984), 44 mins
- Virtues of Negative Fascination: Five Mechanized Performances by Survival Research Laboratories (1986), 75 mins
- The Will to Provoke (1988), 42 mins
- The Pleasures of Uninhibited Excess (1990), 45 mins
- Ten Years of Robotic Mayhem (2001 or 2004) – compilation DVD of his work with Survival Research Laboratories, OCLC 55872058

=== Music videos ===
- "Gave Up" by Nine Inch Nails (1992) – one of two different videos made for the song
- "Happiness in Slavery" by Nine Inch Nails (1992)
- "Christian Woman" by Type O Negative (1993) – one of two different videos made for the song
- "It's Coming Down" by Danzig (1993)
- "Dittohead" by Slayer (1994)
- "Do You Take This Man" by Diamanda Galás (1994)
- "Serenity in Murder" by Slayer (1994)
- "Wiser Time" by The Black Crowes (1994)
- "Archive de la Morte" by Danzig (2003)
- "Suburban Life" by Kottonmouth Kings (2008)

=== Awards and recognition ===
- 1998: Cleopatra's Second Husband was nominated at the Hamptons International Film Festival for Best American Independent Film.
- 1998: Cleopatra's Second Husband was nominated at the Cinequest Film Festival for Best Feature and won the award at the same festival for Best First Feature.
- 1999: Cleopatra's Second Husband won the Silver Award at the WorldFest-Houston International Film Festival for Theatrical Feature Films – 006.
- 1999: Better Living Through Circuitry won the Silver Jury Award at the Chicago Underground Film Festival for Best Documentary.
- 2000: Named one of "10 Digital Directors to Watch" by Daily Variety
- 2007: Bomb It was chosen as the Official Selection at the Tribeca Film Festival
