= Anthony Stark (director) =

American film director & screenwriter (1961-2011)

Anthony Stark (August 12, 1961 – October 19, 2011) was an American film director and screenwriter. He co-wrote and directed the 1998 film Into My Heart with Sean Smith.

His other films as writer include The Art of Murder and The Zone. He graduated from Columbia University and the London Film School. His father, Art Stark, was a television producer whose credits include Who Do You Trust? and The Tonight Show.
