= Feds (TV series) =

1997 American legal drama television series

- Genre: Legal drama
- Created by: Dick Wolf; Michael S. Chernuchin
- Starring: Blair Brown; Regina Taylor; Adrian Pasdar
- Composer: Mike Post
- Country of origin: United States
- Original language: English
- No. of seasons: 1
- No. of episodes: 6

Production
- Executive producers: Dick Wolf; Michael S. Chernuchin
- Running time: 60 minutes
- Production companies: Wolf Films; Universal Television

Original release
- Network: CBS
- Release: March 5 – April 9, 1997

Feds is an American legal drama television series that aired on CBS from March 5, 1997 to April 9, 1997. It was created by Dick Wolf, and starred Blair Brown and Dylan Baker. Michael S. Chernuchin was also an executive producer for the project. The series is notable for being the first to air in letter-boxed form (16:9) in the United States.

== Cast ==
- Blair Brown as Erica Stanton
- Regina Taylor as Sandra Broome
- John Slattery as Michael Mancini
- Adrian Pasdar as C. Oliver Resor
- Grace Phillips as Jessica Graham
- Dylan Baker as Jack Gaffney
- George DiCenzo as Tony Garufi

== Episodes ==
| No. | Title | Directed by | Written by | Original release date | Prod. code |
|---|---|---|---|---|---|
| 1 | "Crash & Burn" | John David Coles | Story by : Michael S. Chernuchin & Gallatin Warfield; Teleplay by : Dick Wolf & Michael S. Chernuchin | March 5, 1997 | K2001 |
| 2 | "Do No Harm" | Colin Bucksey | Larry Moskowitz | March 12, 1997 | K2003 |
| 3 | "The War Against Crime" | Ed Sherin | Dick Wolf & Michael S. Chernuchin | March 19, 1997 | K2002 |
| 4 | "Missing Pieces" | Michael Katleman | Bonnie Mark | March 26, 1997 | K2005 |
| 5 | "Somebody's Lyin'" | James Quinn | Bonnie Mark & Gardner Stern | April 2, 1997 | K2004 |
| 6 | "Smoking Gun" | Rick Rosenthal | Bonnie Mark & Gardner Stern | April 9, 1997 | K2006 |
