= Benjamin Franklin in popular culture =

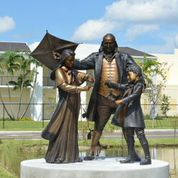
Benjamin Franklin statue by George Lundeen

Benjamin Franklin, one of the Founding Fathers of the United States of America, has appeared in popular culture as a character in novels, films, musicals, comics, and video games. His experiment, using a kite, to prove that lightning is a form of electricity has been an especially popular aspect of his biography in fictional depictions.

== Media about Franklin ==
=== Biographical: film, television, and theater ===
- Ben Franklin in Paris, 1964 theatrical musical.
- The Lives of Benjamin Franklin, 1974 miniseries in which Franklin is played by different actors at different stages of his life.
- Benjamin Franklin, 2002 PBS documentary series.
- Benjamin Franklin, 2022 Ken Burns documentary.
- Franklin, a 2024 Apple TV+ miniseries with Michael Douglas as Franklin. It depicts the eight years Franklin spent in France attempting to convince King Louis XVI to support the American Revolutionary War.

=== As a supporting figure ===
==== Film, television, and theater ====
- Franklin appears in Janice Meredith (1924), played by Lee Beggs.
- Franklin appears in Lloyd's of London (1936), played by Thomas Pogue.
- Franklin appears in Marie Antoinette (1938), played by Walter Walker.
- Franklin appears in Royal Affairs in Versailles (1954), played by Orson Welles.
- Franklin appears in John Paul Jones (1959), played by Charles Coburn.
- Franklin appears in La Fayette (1961), played again by Orson Welles.
- Beginning in 1964, Fredd Wayne portrayed Franklin numerous times on television and in his one-man show Benjamin Franklin, Citizen in theaters throughout the United States and Europe.
- Franklin appears in 1776, 1969 theatrical musical, played by Howard da Silva and Rex Everhart.
- Franklin appears in 1776, 1972 musical film, played by Howard da Silva reprising his theatrical role.
- Franklin appears in Independence, 1976 docudrama film, played by Eli Wallach.
- Franklin appears in The Adams Chronicles, 1976 PBS series, played by Robert Symonds.
- Franklin appears in The Bastard, 1978 miniseries, played by Tom Bosley.
- Franklin appears in A More Perfect Union, 1989 film, played by Fredd Wayne.
- Franklin appears in Liberty! The American Revolution, 1997 PBS series.
- Franklin appears in 1776, 1997 theatrical musical revival, played by Pat Hingle and David Huddleston.
- Franklin appears in several episodes of Histeria! (1998-2000), voiced by actor Billy West similarly to Jay Leno. He is frequently shown flying his kite in a lightning storm and being electrocuted as a running gag.
- Franklin appears in the 2002-03 PBS animated series Liberty's Kids, voiced by Walter Cronkite.
- Franklin appears in the 2006 History Channel miniseries The Revolution.
- Franklin appears in the 2008 HBO miniseries John Adams, played by Tom Wilkinson.
- Franklin appears in the 2013-2017 TV series Sleepy Hollow, played by Jon Sparks in Season One and by Timothy Busfield in Season Two.
- Franklin appears in Beyond the Mask (2015), played by Alan Madlane.
- Franklin appears in the 2015 History Channel series, Sons of Liberty, played by Dean Norris.
- Franklin appears in the 2015 play Mr Foote's Other Leg by Colin Stinton.
- In the 2015 Broadway musical Hamilton, Franklin's lightning experiment is referenced in the song "Satisfied" as Angelica Schuyler describes meeting Alexander Hamilton for the first time:

"It's a feeling of freedom, of seein' the light
It's Ben Franklin with a key and a kite!"

- Hamilton creator Lin-Manuel Miranda wrote a song intended for the musical, "Ben Franklin's Song", that was entirely about Franklin, but it was not included in the finished production. In 2017, it was recorded and released by The Decemberists.
- Franklin appears in the 2024 drama film Here, played by Keith Bartlett.
- Franklin is portrayed by John Paul Sneed in the 2026 drama film A Great Awakening.

==== Novels ====
- Proud Destiny (1947) by Lion Feuchtwanger, a novel mainly about Pierre Beaumarchais and Franklin beginning in Paris in 1776.
- Franklin appears in the 1974 John Jakes novel The Bastard.
- Franklin appears in the 1986 Fred Saberhagen novel The Frankenstein Papers, and part of the novel is written as letters to Franklin.
- Franklin is a character in the 1997 Thomas Pynchon novel Mason & Dixon.
- A young Franklin appears in Neal Stephenson's 2003 novel of 17th century science and alchemy, Quicksilver.

== Fictional interpretations of Franklin ==
=== Alternate histories ===
- Franklin appears in The Remarkable Andrew (1942), played by George Watts.
- The Walt Disney cartoon Ben and Me (1953), based on the book by Robert Lawson, counterfactually explains that Franklin's achievements were actually the ideas of a mouse named Amos.
- Stan Freberg's comedic audio recording, Stan Freberg Presents the United States of America Volume One: The Early Years, depicts all of Franklin's accomplishments as having been made by his young apprentice, Myron.
- The 2004 film National Treasure has the main characters trying to collect clues left by Franklin to discover a treasure that he hid.
- Franklin has been portrayed in several works of fiction, such as The Fairly OddParents, as having lightning-and-kite-based superpowers akin to those of Storm from X-Men.
- The anime Code Geass takes place in an alternate universe where Great Britain is known as the Holy Britannian Empire. Franklin, who was responsible with appealing to France for aid in the American war for independence, is instead bribed by the Duke of Britannia with promises of territories in the colonies and becomes an Earl. As a result, George Washington is killed during the Siege of Yorktown and the American movement for independence fails.
- Sixteen-year-old Ben Franklin plays a significant role in The Age of Unreason, a series of four alternate history novels written by American science fiction and fantasy author Gregory Keyes.
- In Bentley Little's short story The Washingtonians and the Masters of Horror episode of the same name, Franklin was revealed to have been a composite of the accomplishments of several different people as opposed to one real individual.
- In Assassin's Creed III, Benjamin Franklin appears as a non-playable character. The player has the optional side-quest of retrieving lost pages from Poor Richard's Almanack for Ben. Also, he is present in the cutaway scenes involving the raising of George Washington to leader of the Continental Army and the signing of the Declaration of Independence. In Assassin's Creed: Rogue, he has a small role as inventor and American ambassador in Paris.
- In Beyond the Mask, Benjamin Franklin (Alan Madlane) is a significant character who, along with the protagonist Will(iam) Reynolds (Andrew Cheney), thwarts a plot by the East India Company, headed by John Rhys Davies, to disrupt the signing of the Declaration of Independence with a bomb.
- Benjamin Franklin's ghost appears in several Marvel comics as a companion to the mercenary Deadpool. In the comic, Franklin found a way to harness the power of electricity to turn himself into a ghost.
- Also in Marvel Comics, Doctor Strange's girlfriend Clea was seduced by a wizard (Stygyro) disguised as Ben Franklin during a time travel story arc. The "real" Ben Franklin made an appearance at the end of the story.
- In the alternate history short story "The Father of His Country" by Jody Lynn Nye contained in the anthology Alternate Presidents, Benjamin Franklin is elected as the first President of the United States in the 1789 election over his sole opponent George Washington with John Adams becoming his Vice President. As a result of this, he creates a more democratic society.
- In the science fiction/alternate history short story "Existential Trips" by William Bevill, Benjamin Franklin appears, and is referenced throughout, as the inventor of a secret society of ghosts who fight crime in time and other dimensions of space, using items from Franklin including a stove and spectacles. Franklin's agents include Beatnik writers Jack Kerouac and William S. Burroughs.

=== Time-travel scenarios ===
- The time-travel card game Early American Chrononauts includes a card called Franklin's Kite which players can symbolically acquire from the year 1752.
- In The Jack Benny Program episode "Alexander Hamilton Show", Jack Benny dreams that he is Alexander Hamilton; Don Wilson plays Franklin.
- In an episode of The Flintstones titled "The Time Machine" (season 5, episode 18, original airdate January 15, 1965), the Flintstones and the Rubbles travel by time machine to various periods in the future (from their perspective). One of those stops is in Philadelphia, where they meet Benjamin Franklin as he is conducting his kite-and-key experiment. When Wilma says something Franklin deems worthy of writing down, he asks Fred to hold the kite string. Naturally, the lightning picks that moment to strike the kite, electrifying Fred. In turn, Barney, Betty, and Wilma try to separate Fred from the kite string, only to be electrified themselves. "So that's how electricity works, eh?" says Franklin. "I'd better write this down."
- In season 3 of Bewitched, Aunt Clara accidentally brings him forward in time to repair a broken electrical lamp.
- The science-fiction TV show Voyagers! had the main characters helping Franklin fly his kite in one episode and save his mother from a fictionalized Salem witch trial in the next episode.
- Franklin appears in the LucasArts Entertainment Company Game Day of the Tentacle.
- A 1992 Saturday Night Live spoof of Quantum Leap, "Founding Fathers", had Franklin traveling through time with George Washington and Thomas Jefferson to help modern day Americans with deficit reduction, only to find twentieth century reporters are only interested in scandal and sensationalism.
- The children's novel Qwerty Stevens: Stuck in Time with Benjamin Franklin has the main characters using their time machine to bring Franklin into modern times and then to travel back with him to 1776.
- In a 2004 sketch on the TV show MADtv, Franklin, played by Paul Vogt, sends Samuel Adams, played by Josh Meyers, to the future in a time machine he made from a rolltop desk. Franklin wanted to know if the American Revolution was a success, but gets frustrated when Adams only comes back to tell him that Samuel Adams Beer is a success. The time machine also brings back a man named Jerry, played by Ike Barinholtz, who is little help to Franklin.
- A Saul of the Mole Men episode titled "Poor Clancy's Almanack" uses Benjamin Franklin and Thomas Jefferson to explain the true mainstream conflict while revealing Clancy Burrows' past. Both Franklin and Jefferson appear again in the spin-off Young Person's Guide to History. Dana Snyder portrayed Franklin in both series.
- In the webcomic Spinnerette, Franklin is pulled through time by a machine into present day. Because the timeline dictated he died in 1790, he was rendered effectively invulnerable to danger by way of preternatural luck in order to avoid temporal paradoxes. He took up hero-work and became a leading member of the American Superhero Association.
- In the animated series Big Guy and Rusty the Boy Robot, the titular characters secure Franklin's aid to power a damaged time machine that has brought them to colonial America on the first night of the Revolutionary War.
- Franklin is referred to in the Ben 10: Omniverse series finale "A New Dawn", in which he is revealed to have crafted various tools for George Washington's use as part of a secret society predating the series' Plumbers, a galactic law enforcement division that deals with various alien and supernatural threats.
- A character based on Franklin appears in Norm Novitsky's 2017 time travel film In Search of Liberty.
- In the Kids' TV show The Fairly OddParents, Franklin appears as a side character in some episodes.

== People compared to Franklin ==
- Manuel Torres, the first Colombian ambassador to the United States, was called "the Franklin of the southern world" by newspapers on his death in 1828. He was a revolutionary, scholar and diplomat.

== Characters based on Franklin ==
- In the webcomic The Adventures of Dr. McNinja, McNinja's mentor in medical school was a clone of Franklin.
- In the Spider-Man comic books and related media, Peter Parker's Uncle Ben is based on and named after Franklin.

== Characters named after Franklin ==
- In the Giacomo Puccini opera Madama Butterfly (1904), the lead male character is Lt. Benjamin Franklin Pinkerton.
- M*A*S*H protagonist Benjamin Franklin "Hawkeye" Pierce is named after a portmanteau of the names of Benjamin Franklin and President Franklin Pierce.
- In the sports comedy film The Sandlot (1993), actor Mike Vitar's character is named Benjamin Franklin Rodriguez.
- The Prison Break character Benjamin Miles "C-Note" Franklin is named after Franklin.
- In the adventure film National Treasure (2004) and the sequel, National Treasure: Book of Secrets (2007), Nicolas Cage portrays the protagonist, Benjamin Franklin Gates, a fictional historian/treasure hunter.
- The Community character Benjamin Franklin Chang is named after Franklin.
- The video game Grand Theft Auto V (2013) features the character Franklin Clinton, named after Franklin.

== As portrayed by fictional characters ==
- "Julian McGrath", played by Dylan and Cole Sprouse, appears as Franklin in a school play in the Adam Sandler comedy Big Daddy (1999).
- In the episode of the sitcom The Office entitled "Ben Franklin" (2007; S03 E15), an actor portraying Franklin is hired for an office party.

== Other ==
- The c. 1816 Benjamin West painting, Benjamin Franklin Drawing Electricity from the Sky.
- The YouTube web series Epic Rap Battles of History features a video where Benjamin Franklin is placed in combat against Billy Mays and Vince Offer.
- A Benjamin Franklin impersonator appears as a playable character in the video game Tony Hawk's Underground 2. One of the character's special moves replicates the kite experiment.
- The mascot of the Philadelphia 76ers NBA team is a dog named Franklin, after Benjamin Franklin. An alternate logo for the team depicts Franklin playing basketball.
- In the Cartoon Network comedy series Mad, Franklin appears as a central character in some episodes. He stars in the short "Ben 10 Franklin", a parody of Ben 10 where he acquires the Omnitrix.
- Benjamin Franklin is a playable leader in the 2025 video game Civilization VII.

== See also ==
- Category:Cultural depictions of scientists
- List of places named for Benjamin Franklin
- Lightning rod fashion
