= American Revolution (disambiguation) =

The American Revolution was an 18th-century ideological and political revolution in British America.

American Revolution may also refer to:

- American Revolutionary War, a 1775–1783 military conflict between the United States and Great Britain for the independence of the United States

== Literature ==
- The American Revolution (Snowden book), a 1796 book by Richard Snowden
- The American Revolution: A Constitutional Interpretation, a 1924 book by Charles Howard McIlwain
- The American Revolution: A Global War, a 1977 book by R. Ernest Dupuy, Gay Hammerman, and Grace P. Hayes
- American Revolutions: A Continental History, 1750–1804, a 2016 history book by Alan Taylor

== Music ==
- Thee American Revolution, an American rock band formed in 2004
- The American Revolution (album), a 1970 album by David Peel and the Lower East Side

== Television ==
- The American Revolution (2006 miniseries), or The Revolution, an American documentary series on The History Channel
- The American Revolution (2014 miniseries), an American documentary series on the American Heroes Channel
- The American Revolution (TV series), a 2025 American documentary series directed by Ken Burns

== Other uses ==
- The American Revolution: 1775–1783, a 1972 board wargame
- "An American Revolution", a 2004–2009 Chevrolet advertising campaign
  - An American Revolution 150, later the Kevin Whitaker Chevrolet 150, a NASCAR race

== See also ==
- American Revolution 2, a 1969 documentary film about the 1968 U.S. Democratic National Convention
- WBCN and the American Revolution, a 2012 documentary film about a Boston radio station
- Latin American revolutions (disambiguation)
- Category:Rebellions in North America
- Category:Rebellions in South America
