= We Fight to Be Free =

2006 American short biographical film

- Film poster
- Directed by: Kees Van Oostrum
- Written by: Lionel Chetwynd
- Produced by: Olga Arana; Rick Brookwell; Kasper Graversen; Craig Haffner; Seth Isler; Lynn Kramer; Jose C. Mangual
- Starring: Sebastian Roché; Caroline Goodall; Stephen Lang; Peter Woodward
- Cinematography: Kees Van Oostrum
- Edited by: Victor Du Bois
- Music by: Trevor Jones
- Distributed by: Mount Vernon
- Release date: October 27, 2006
- Running time: 24 minutes
- Country: United States
- Language: English
- Budget: $5 million

We Fight to Be Free is a 2006 short biographical film about George Washington directed by Kees Van Oostrum and starring Sebastian Roché, Caroline Goodall, Stephen Lang and Peter Woodward.

== Synopsis ==
The film features the story of American Revolutionary war hero and first United States president, George Washington, including his military achievements and pivotal moments in his life.

== Cast ==
- Sebastian Roché as George Washington
- Caroline Goodall as Martha Dandridge Custis
- Stephen Lang as James Craik
- Peter Woodward as Edward Braddock

== Reception ==
The film has received generally positive reviews. Desson Thomson wrote for The Washington Post, "'We Fight to Be Free' is the real headliner: a rousing 18-minute action film about Washington's life that greets visitors to the new Ford Orientation Center". Denise D. Meringolo was critical of the film, writing for The Public Historian:

"We Fight to Be Free" is oddly incomplete—it fails to explain fully Washington’s attachment to the estate or to portray the complexity of his choices as a military officer and a political figure.

== See also ==
- George Washington (1984 miniseries)
- George Washington II: The Forging of a Nation (1986 miniseries)
- Washington, 2020 miniseries
- Cultural depictions of George Washington
- List of television series and miniseries about the American Revolution
- List of films about the American Revolution
