= The Devil's Disciple (1987 film) =

1987 British television film

- Genre: Drama
- Created by: George Bernard Shaw
- Based on: The Devil's Disciple; 1897 play by George Bernard Shaw
- Directed by: David Hugh Jones
- Starring: Patrick Stewart; Ian Richardson; Mike Gwilym; Susan Wooldridge
- Theme music composer: Stephen Oliver
- Countries of origin: United Kingdom; Canada
- Original language: English

Original release
- Release: 17 May 1987

The Devil's Disciple is a 1987 television film adaptation of the 1897 George Bernard Shaw play of the same title.

== Cast and characters ==
- Patrick Stewart – The Rev. Anthony Anderson
- Mike Gwilym – Dick Dudgeon
- Ian Richardson – Gen. John Burgoyne
- Susan Wooldridge – Judith Anderson
- Elizabeth Spriggs – Mrs. Dudgeon
- Benjamin Whitrow – Maj. Swindon
- Patrick Godfrey – Lawyer Hawkins
- Larry Lamb – British Sergeant
- Graham Turner – Christy Dudgeon
- Patrick Newell – William

== See also ==
- List of films about the American Revolution
- List of television series and miniseries about the American Revolution
