= Independence (1976 film) =

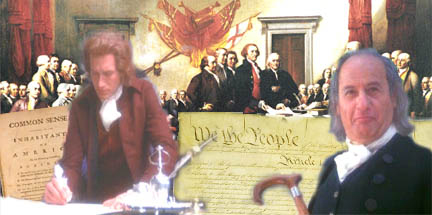
- Poster
- Directed by: John Huston
- Written by: Tom McGrath; Joyce Ritter; Lloyd Ritter
- Produced by: Joyce Ritter; Lloyd Ritter
- Starring: Eli Wallach; William Atherton; Pat Hingle; Anne Jackson
- Narrated by: E.G. Marshall
- Cinematography: Owen Roizman
- Edited by: Eric Albertson
- Music by: Jack Cortner
- Production company: 20th Century Fox
- Distributed by: National Park Service
- Release date: 1976
- Running time: 28 minutes
- Country: United States
- Language: English

Independence is a 1976 docudrama short film directed by John Huston. It was produced for the U.S. National Park Service on the Bicentennial of the United States.

Screened by the Independence National Historical Park, Independence provides an overview of the political events that took place in Philadelphia between 1774 and 1800.

== Synopsis ==
Founding Fathers Benjamin Franklin, George Washington, Thomas Jefferson, and others come back to life and relive key historic events in Philadelphia during the founding of the United States, including the signing of the Declaration of Independence in 1776, the Constitutional Convention in 1787, and the inauguration of President John Adams in 1797.

== Cast ==
- William Atherton as Benjamin Rush
- John Favorite as John Lansing Jr.
- Pat Hingle as John Adams
- Anne Jackson as Abigail Adams
- Patrick O'Neal as George Washington
- Ken Howard as Thomas Jefferson (reprising his role from 1776)
- Donald C. Moore as Benjamin Harrison
- Scott Mulhern as Alexander Hamilton
- John Randolph as Samuel Adams
- Paul Sparer as John Hancock
- Tom Spratley as George Mason
- Donald Symington as Richard Henry Lee
- James Tolkan as Thomas Paine
- Eli Wallach as Benjamin Franklin
- E.G. Marshall as the narrator

== See also ==
- Founding Fathers of the United States
- List of films about the American Revolution
- List of television series and miniseries about the American Revolution
