= Chamber Music Charleston =

American nonprofit organization

Chamber Music Charleston is an American 501(c)(3) nonprofit organization dedicated to music education and the performance of chamber music in and around Charleston, South Carolina.

Chamber Music Charleston was founded by bassoonist Sandra Nikolajevs in 2006, who remains its director. It performs numerous concerts and events in homes, historic venues, churches and galleries throughout the South Carolina Lowcountry region, including series in historic downtown Charleston, Kiawah Island, Seabrook Island and Daniel Island. It has collaborated with leading Charleston cultural organizations including the Footlight Players Theater, Actors Theatre of South Carolina, ArtsMusic Productions, the Preservation Society of Charleston, Ballet Evolution, and the Piccolo Spoleto Festival. Notable among these have been productions of Dylan Thomas' A Child's Christmas in Wales with veteran screen actor Clarence Felder; Beethoven: His Women and His Music, also with Felder; The Gift of the Magi directed and produced by veteran television and film actor Chris Weatherhead; Margot Theis Raven's critically acclaimed children's story Circle Unbroken set to the music of William Grant Still and Margot Theis Raven's children's story America's White Table set to the music of Charles Ives. The DVD Circle Unbroken received numerous awards including "Best Children’s Film Award" at the XXIV Black International Cinema Berlin Film Festival 2009 and "Award of Excellence" at the 2009 Accolade Competition in La Jolla, California.

CMC's roster includes eleven local professional musicians, many of whom are current and former principal members of Savannah Philharmonic, Hilton Head Symphony Orchestra, and the Charleston Symphony Orchestra. CMC also invites acclaimed national musicians to perform with the musicians of CMC. Such guest musicians have included violinists Jennifer Frautschi, Elizabeth Pitcairn, Danel Ching, Francisco Fullana, Karen Kim, Amy Schwartz Moretti, and Anthea Kreston; pianists Andrew Armstrong and Phillip Bush; Bassist Xavier Foley.

During the 2021-2022 Concert Season Guest Violinist Midori, performed a special recital with pianist Özgür Aydin.

Past and continuing activities include the Mozart in the South Festival, Ovation Concerts, Salon Series Concerts at South Carolina Society Hall, Memminger Auditorium Concerts, Gallery Concerts, Classical Kids Concerts and "instrumental petting zoos" in addition to their House Concerts.

Chamber Music Charleston is listed on the Southern Artistry Website, highlighting accomplished artists and arts organizations in the South East. Articles about the organization and reviews of past performances appear in The Post and Courier, Charleston City Paper, CharlestonToday.net, ETV Radio South Carolina Educational Television, Florence News Journal, The Island Packet/Beaufort Gazette and Moon South Carolina
