= Das große Abenteuer des Kaspar Schmeck =

- Country of origin: East Germany
- No. of episodes: 3

Original release
- Release: 1 January – 3 January 1982

Das große Abenteuer des Kaspar Schmeck is an East German television film in three parts about Hessian mercenaries based on a novel by Grete Weiskopf.

== See also ==
- List of German television series
- List of films about the American Revolution
- List of television series and miniseries about the American Revolution
