= Bicentennial Minutes =

- The opening graphic, seen at the beginning of all Bicentennial Minutes.
- Country of origin: United States
- Original language: English
- No. of episodes: 912

Production
- Running time: 1 minute

Original release
- Network: CBS
- Release: July 4, 1974 – December 31, 1976

Bicentennial Minutes was a series of short educational American television segments commemorating the bicentennial of the American Revolution. The segments were produced by the CBS Television Network and broadcast nightly from July 4, 1974, until December 31, 1976. (The series was originally slated to end on July 4, 1976, but was extended to the end of the year, airing a total of 912 episodes.) The segments were sponsored by Shell Oil Company, then later by Raid from July 1976 onward.

== Description ==
The series was created by Ethel Winant and Lewis Freedman of CBS, who had overcome the objections of network executives who considered it to be an unworthy use of program time. The producer of the series was Paul Waigner, the executive producer was Bob Markell, and the executive story editor and writer was Bernard Eismann from 1974 to 1976. He was followed by Jerome Alden. Associate producer Meryle Evans researched the historical facts for the broadcasts. In 1976, the series received an Emmy Award in the category of Special Classification of Outstanding Program and Individual Achievement. It also won a Special Christopher Award in 1976.

The videotaped segments were each one minute long and were broadcast each night during prime time hours, generally at approximately 8:27 or 8:57 P.M. Eastern time. The format of the segments did not change, although each segment featured a different narrator, often a CBS network television star. The narrator, after introducing himself or herself, would say "Two hundred years ago today..." and describe a historical event or personage prominent on that particular date two hundred years before and during the American Revolution. The segment would close with the narrator saying, "I'm (his/her name), and that's the way it was." This was an offhand reference to the close of the weeknight CBS Evening News with Walter Cronkite, who always ended each news telecast by saying, "And that's the way it is."

The Bicentennial Minute on July 3, 1976, was narrated by Vice President Nelson Rockefeller. The Bicentennial Minute on July 4, 1976, was narrated by First Lady Betty Ford. The final Bicentennial Minute, broadcast on December 31, 1976, was narrated by President Gerald Ford (his was also the longest Bicentennial Minute). After the series ended, the time slot of the Bicentennial Minute came to be occupied by a brief synopsis of news headlines ("Newsbreak") read by a CBS anchor.

== In popular culture ==
The Bicentennial Minute achieved a high cultural profile during its run and was widely referenced and parodied. For example, in the All in the Family episode "Mike's Move" (originally broadcast on February 2, 1976), the character Mike Stivic responded to a typical monologue by his father-in-law Archie Bunker about the history of American immigration and the meaning of the Statue of Liberty with the sarcastic comment: "I think we just heard Archie Bunker's Bicentennial Minute." Another Norman Lear–produced sitcom, Sanford and Son, featured series star Redd Foxx parodying the Bicentennial Minute.

Country music also used the Bicentennial Minute as a source of humor. The long-running television program Hee Haw parodied Bicentennial Minutes as "About 200 Years Ago", with musician Grandpa Jones (wearing a mockery of a tri-cornered hat) giving a weekly monologue of humorously fractured historical "facts", about figures from the American Revolution and the colonial era. These ended with Jones saying, "That's the way it was, about 200 years ago... enh, more or less," and shrugging at the camera. The radio program American Country Countdown had a similar feature, delivered by then-ACC host Don Bowman.

A sketch on The Sonny and Cher Show aired in early 1976 featured guest star Jim Nabors portraying British King George III, offering a comic rebuttal to the always pro–American Revolution Bicentennial Minutes. The Carol Burnett Show with Harvey Korman and Tim Conway did a comic parody. The character Brenda Morgenstern (Julie Kavner) refers to the Bicentennial Minutes in the Rhoda episode "If You Don't Tell Her, I Will," broadcast in December 1975. CBS daytime game show Match Game had questions posed to contestants in this form as well throughout 1975 and 1976. Panelist Charles Nelson Reilly makes a joke that a moment on the New Year's Eve 1976 episode of Match Game 76 is "the last one, thank god."

In the February 24, 1975 episode of Maude "Walter's Pride", when Walter gives Maude a list of reasons for why she cannot mortgage the house to save his business, Maude responds "...I didn't ask for your Bicentennial Minute!"

On the April 24, 1976 episode of the NBC show Saturday Night Live, host Raquel Welch appears in a sketch entitled Bisexual Minutes. Wearing a bicentennial themed bikini she announces, "Good evening. I'm Gore Vidal." Welch had previously appeared in the 1970 film Myra Breckinridge which was based on the 1968 novel of the same name by Vidal, a noted bisexual.

In an episode of The King of Queens, Arthur briefly references the Bicentennial Minute by saying how in 1976 he remembers "throwing a pair of glasses at the TV during a particularly offensive Bicentennial Minute!"

== See also ==
- Commemoration of the American Revolution
- Heritage Minutes, similar Canadian series
- List of television series and miniseries about the American Revolution
