= The Swamp Fox (TV series) =

American television series

Production
- Production company: Walt Disney Studios

Original release
- Release: October 23, 1959 – January 16, 1961

The Swamp Fox is a television miniseries produced by Walt Disney Studios and starring Leslie Nielsen as American Revolutionary War general Francis Marion. The show was based on the 1959 book Swamp Fox: The Life and Campaigns of General Francis Marion by Robert D. Bass.

The theme song ("Swamp Fox, Swamp Fox, tail on his hat...") was sung by Nielsen as well. Myron Healey played Marion's top aide, Maj./Col. Peter Horry. One of the Swamp Fox's adversaries was Colonel Banastre Tarleton, played by John Sutton. Patrick Macnee played a British captain, Tim Considine played Marion's nephew Gabe Marion and Slim Pickens played Plunkett, one of the Swamp Fox's men. Hal Stalmaster appeared in three of the eight episodes as "Gwynn." J. Pat O'Malley played a British guard in the 1st episode and co-starred as Sgt O'Reilly in subsequent episodes. The Swamp Fox did not bring to Disney the commercial success that had been achieved by Davy Crockett.

The series encompassed eight intermittent episodes running from 1959 to 1961 as part of Walt Disney Presents. Episodes were presented on Sundays on ABC from 6:30 to 7:30 p.m. and were also broadcast by CBC Television.

The Disney Channel reran Swamp Fox episodes in the 1980s and 1990s, while Nielsen was at the height of a second career as a white-haired comedy movie star. The first three episodes of the series were also released in 2005 on DVD (in a set including three episodes of The Nine Lives of Elfego Baca).

== Cast ==
- Leslie Nielsen Francis Marion
- Tim Considine Gabe Marion
- Myron Healey Maj./Col. Peter Horry
- John Sutton Colonel Banastre Tarlton
- Hal Stalmaster Gwynn
- Slim Pickens Plunkett
- J. Pat O’Malley British guard, Sgt O'Reilly
- Patrick Macnee British Captain
- Eleanor Audley
- Louise Beavers
- Ralph Clanton
- Henry Daniell
- Robert Douglas
- Barbara Eiler
- Richard Erdman
- Dick Foran
- Arthur Hunnicutt
- Sean McClory
- Joy Page
- Jordan Whitfield
- Rhys Williams

== Episodes ==
Episode #	Title	Director	Original airdate
1	"The Birth of the Swamp Fox"	Harry Keller	October 23, 1959
2	"Brother Against Brother"	Harry Keller	October 30, 1959
3	"Tory Vengeance"	Louis King	January 1, 1960
4	"Day of Reckoning"	Louis King	January 8, 1960
5	"Redcoat Strategy"	Louis King	January 15, 1960
6	"A Case of Treason"	Louis King	January 22, 1960
7	"A Woman's Courage"	Lewis R. Foster	January 8, 1961
8	"Horses for Greene"	Lewis R. Foster	January 15, 1961

== See also ==
- List of television series and miniseries about the American Revolution
- List of films about the American Revolution
