= George Washington (miniseries) =

1984 American television miniseries

- Genre: Biography; Drama; History; War; Miniseries
- Based on: George Washington (1965-72 biography) by James Thomas Flexner
- Screenplay by: Jon Boothe; Richard Fielder
- Directed by: Buzz Kulik
- Starring: Barry Bostwick; Patty Duke Astin
- Music by: Laurence Rosenthal
- Country of origin: United States
- Original language: English
- No. of episodes: 3

Production
- Executive producer: David Gerber
- Producers: Richard Fielder; Buzz Kulik (sup.)
- Cinematography: Harry Stradling Jr.
- Editors: Donald Douglas; Mel Friedman; Les Green; David Wages
- Running time: 480 minutes
- Production companies: David Gerber Productions; MGM/UA Television

Original release
- Network: CBS
- Release: April 8 – April 11, 1984

Related
- George Washington II: The Forging of a Nation (1986)

George Washington is a 1984 American biographical historical television miniseries, that chronicles the life of George Washington, the first President of the United States from the age of 11 to the age of 51. It is directed by Buzz Kulik and stars Barry Bostwick in the titular role and Patty Duke Astin as Martha Washington. The supporting cast features Jaclyn Smith, Lloyd Bridges, José Ferrer, Hal Holbrook, Trevor Howard, James Mason, Clive Revill, and Robert Stack. The screenplay is based on James Thomas Flexner biography of Washington, originally published between 1965 and 1972.

The miniseries first aired in three installments on CBS, between April 8 and 11, 1984. The first episode Washington's life in the French and Indian War, the second shows the coming and commencement of the Revolutionary War and the final part describes the victory of the independence from Great Britain.

The series was a critical and commercial success, and was nominated for six Primetime Emmys including for Outstanding Limited Series. A sequel miniseries, George Washington II: The Forging of a Nation, aired in 1986.

== Plot ==
The miniseries covers the life of George Washington, from being a young man to his experiences in the French and Indian War and his rise to lead the Continental Army during the American Revolutionary War. It concludes shortly after the end of the war, with his return to his home in Mount Vernon.

== Cast ==
- Barry Bostwick as George Washington
- Patty Duke Astin as Martha Washington
- David Dukes as George William Fairfax
- Jaclyn Smith as Sally Fairfax
- Lloyd Bridges as Caleb Quinn
- José Ferrer as Robert Dinwiddie
- Hal Holbrook as John Adams
- Trevor Howard as Lord Fairfax
- Jeremy Kemp as Horatio Gates
- Richard Kiley as George Mason
- Stephen Macht as Benedict Arnold
- James Mason as Edward Braddock
- Rosemary Murphy as Mary Ball Washington
- Clive Revill as Lord Loudoun
- Robert Stack as John Stark
- Anthony Zerbe as Jacques Legardeur de St. Pierre
- J. Kenneth Campbell as Richard Henry Lee
- Philip Casnoff as Marquis de Lafayette
- Josh Clark as Tench Tilghman
- Kevin Conroy as John Laurens
- Peter Evans as Thomas Mifflin
- Megan Gallagher as Peggy Shippen
- John Glover as Charles Lee
- Harry Groener as Patrick Henry
- Patrick Horgan as William Howe
- Robert Schenkkan as Alexander Hamilton
- Jon Matthews as John Parke Custis
- Christine Estabrook as Abigail Adams
- Tom Assalone as Augustine Washington Jr.
- William Prince as William Fairfax
- Richard Fancy as Sam Adams
- Scott Hylands as General Nathanael Greene
- Kelsey Grammer as Lieutenant Stewart
- Brad Sullivan as Major General Artemas Ward
- Louis Turenne as Comte de Rochambeau

== Production ==
The miniseries was shot mainly on location near Washington, DC and in Virginia and Philadelphia, including in Colonial Williamsburg, Independence National Historical Park, Mount Pleasant, Valley Forge National Historical Park, and at Fort Belvoir.

== See also ==
- George Washington II: The Forging of a Nation (1986 sequel miniseries)
- We Fight to Be Free (2006 film)
- Washington (2020 miniseries)
- Cultural depictions of George Washington
- List of television series and miniseries about the American Revolution
- List of films about the American Revolution
