= Spirit of Seventy Sex =

- Film Poster
- Directed by: Stu Segall (as Ms. Ricki Krelmn)
- Written by: Stu Segall (Written by) (as Ms. Michelle Krelmn); Ebenezer Bartholomu (Original story)
- Produced by: Stu Segall (as Ms. Ricki Krelmn)
- Starring: Annette Haven; John C. Holmes; Tyler Reynolds; John Seeman; Jeff Lyle
- Cinematography: K.L. Kipper
- Edited by: Joe Diamond
- Production company: Krelmn Sisters Film Dynasty
- Distributed by: Artemis Film; VCX; Pink Video; Ventura Video
- Release dates: September 10, 1976; (Chicago, Illinois) (US)
- Running time: 65 min.
- Country: United States
- Language: English

Spirit of Seventy Sex is a 1976 pornographic film starring Annette Haven and John C. Holmes. Co-written, produced and directed by Stu Segall, it is a tongue-in-cheek look at the sex lives of the Founding Fathers, including George Washington (and his wife Martha, who is played by Haven), Benjamin Franklin and Captain John Smith (Holmes). The film was released the year United States celebrated its Bicentennial.

== Cast ==
- Annette Haven as Martha Washington
- John C. Holmes as Captain John Smith
- Tyler Reynolds as George Washington
- John Seeman as Ben
- Jeff Lyle as Paul
- Ebenezer Bartholomu as himself

== Reception ==
Christos Mouroukis from Cinema Head Cheese found the film boring and with nothing else to offer then "standard sex scenes". "This is a boring collage of standard sex scenes starring known porn faces [such as Annette Haven] while dressed in period costumes and talking about historical nonsense. Certainly not the kind of information one would like to receive from his porn."

== See also ==
- Golden Age of Porn
- List of films about the American Revolution
