= Benjamin Franklin (film) =

2022 American film

- Genre: Documentary
- Written by: Dayton Duncan
- Directed by: Ken Burns
- Starring: Mandy Patinkin; Josh Lucas; Liam Neeson; Paul Giamatti
- Narrated by: Peter Coyote
- Country of origin: United States
- Original language: English
- No. of episodes: 2

Production
- Producers: Ken Burns; David Schmidt
- Running time: 230 minutes
- Production companies: Florentine Films; WETA-TV

Original release
- Network: PBS
- Release: April 4 – April 5, 2022

Benjamin Franklin is a 2022 two-part American documentary film directed and produced by Ken Burns that first aired on PBS on April 4 and 5, 2022. The film chronicles the life of Benjamin Franklin, a polymath and Founding Father of the United States. The film is narrated by Peter Coyote and Mandy Patinkin stars as the voice of Franklin. Other voice actors starring in the film include Josh Lucas, Liam Neeson, and Paul Giamatti; Giamatti reprises his role as John Adams from the eponymous HBO miniseries.

== Episodes ==
- Episode One: "Join or Die" (1706–1774)
- Episode Two: "An American" (1775-1790)

== Cast ==
- Peter Coyote as the narrator
- Mandy Patinkin as Benjamin Franklin
- Josh Lucas as William Franklin
- Paul Giamatti as John Adams
- Liam Neeson as Alexander Wedderburn
- Carolyn McCormick as Deborah Franklin
- Joe Morton as William Bradford
- Adam Arkin as Elkanah Watson
- Dave Quay as Daniel Defoe
- Tony Beck as Marquis de Lafayette

== See also ==
- List of films about the American Revolution
- List of television series and miniseries about the American Revolution
- Benjamin Franklin, 1974 miniseries
- Benjamin Franklin, 2002 TV series
- Franklin, 2024 miniseries
