= Beyond the Mask =

- Theatrical film poster
- Directed by: Chad Burns
- Written by: Paul McCusker
- Produced by: Aaron Burns
- Starring: John Rhys-Davies; Andrew Cheney; Kara Killmer; Alan Madlane; Adetokumboh M'Cormack; Samrat Chakrabarti; Steve Blackwood
- Cinematography: Ethan Ledden
- Edited by: Mike Wech
- Music by: Jurgen Beck
- Production company: Burns Family Studios
- Distributed by: Gathr
- Release date: April 6, 2015
- Running time: 103 minutes
- Country: United States
- Language: English
- Budget: $4 million
- Box office: $1,236,094

Beyond the Mask is a 2015 American Christian historical action-adventure film directed by Chad Burns that stars Andrew Cheney, John Rhys-Davies, and Kara Killmer. The film portrays an ex-mercenary (Andrew Cheney) during the American Revolution who wants to redeem himself from a life of murder by becoming a masked vigilante to overthrow the British-ruled colonies.

Burns Family Studios produced the film, which was released in select theaters by Gathr before becoming widely available through Freestyle Releasing. Critics gave the picture a bad assessment. The film was later released on DVD and Blu-ray.

== Plot ==
In 1775, Will Reynolds works for the British East India Company as a mercenary and assassin. He and his partner, Joshua Brand, infiltrate a ship carrying a Parliament report of the misconduct and atrocities committed by the East India Company and swap the document for an altered version. Will secretly keeps the original report. His boss and mentor, Charles Kemp, is a wealthy and influential man who gained his wealth similarly to Will who has promised Will the same lifestyle in return for his service. Will tells Charles that he is retiring as a mercenary. Charles orders his men to kill Will and blow up his carriage, as Will has outlived his usefulness.

A vicar warns Will when the carriage catches on fire, allowing Will to fight off his attackers and escape, although the vicar is accidentally killed instead. Will swaps his clothes and things with the dead vicar’s, faking his death. He collapses in a nearby small English town and is taken in by the Holloway family. He immediately becomes smitten with the Holloway’s daughter, Charlotte, who nurses him back to health. Will assumes the role of the new town vicar, managing to fool the town despite having no knowledge of the church or the Bible. He and Charlotte become close, although his lack of understanding of God confuses Charlotte despite her feelings for him.

Will’s old partner, Joshua Brand, tracks him to town and decides to kill him for the Parliamentary report. Will kills him in self defense and buries the body. With everything that could trace him to the East India Company gone, Will proposes to Charlotte, who asks that he meet her uncle before she gives him an answer. Will agrees, only to be shocked to find that her uncle is Charles Kemp. The Holloway’s servant and former East India Company trader Jeremiah helps Will escape, only to die in the process, although he tells Will that God can free him from his past.

William flees to the colony of Pennsylvania and finds a job in Benjamin Franklin's printing shop. William later discovers that Charlotte and her uncle have arrived in America, with Kemp supporting the loyalists on behalf of the East India Company. William sets out to redeem his name before reuniting with Charlotte. He works as a printer by day and a masked vigilante by night, thwarting the evil plans of the East India Company.

William attends a masked ball in New York with the intention of revealing documents outlining the role of the East India Company, specifically Charles Kemp. He saves the life of George Washington, but is framed, arrested by Kemp, and sentenced to be hanged at dawn.

Realizing her feelings for William as well as her uncle's evilness, Charlotte steals her uncle's next set of plans and breaks William out of the prison ship. They flee to Philadelphia, where she is captured by her uncle's men. Kemp reveals to her that he has planted barrels of gunpowder under various important buildings in the city, notably Independence Hall, where the Continental Congress is debating the Declaration of Independence, with the explosives set to go off at noon, just when the Declaration of Independence is about to be approved. William discovers the gunpowder and traces the trigger back through the new sewer system to Windmill Island, where Kemp and his men have set up a generator and are also holding Charlotte. After revealing the plot to Franklin, William swims to the island and kills Kemp. He rescues Charlotte and blows up the laboratory, preventing a disaster. The Declaration of Independence is passed without incident, much to Franklin's relief.

The two swim back to shore, where Franklin and some soldiers are waiting for them with a prison carriage. The surviving loyalists are arrested, while Charlotte insists on accompanying William. Out of their earshot, Franklin says that the extradition policy between Pennsylvania and New York is vague. Charlotte and Will discover a note saying that the carriage is not taking Will to prison. Will gives Charlotte the ring he has been carrying since he first asked her to marry him back in England; she accepts, and the two kiss.

== Cast ==
- Andrew Cheney as William Reynolds
- John Rhys-Davies as Charles Kemp
- Kara Killmer as Charlotte Holloway
- Alan Madlane as Benjamin Franklin
- Adetokumboh M'Cormack as Joshua Brand
- Samrat Chakrabarti as Basil
- Thomas D. Mahard as Dr. Harrow
- Steve Blackwood as Richard Harrison
- John Arden McClure as George Washington
- Andrew Papa as Daniel Johnston

== Production ==
We’d write an essay about the book we'd just read and then sort of flesh it out. We would study England in the Middle Ages and read Chaucer at the same time. Then we’d dress up in appropriate costumes and eat foods based on the period.

— Aaron Burns on his and Chad's schooling environment that later inspired them to make Beyond the Mask

The idea for the movie began after cousins Aaron and Chad Burns finished their self-produced film called "Pendragon." Aaron said that inspiration for the latter came from novels they both read together when they were younger, and that during their homeschool education, they read and analyzed the literature, biography, historical fiction, and culture that inspired their work in the film. Subsequently, they formed Burns Family Studios and started a Kickstarter campaign in 2011 to fund the costs of production, raising $24,010 against their $20,000 goal.

The movie distribution company Gathr was chosen to help distribute the film for one night in selected theaters, and it was later marketed by churches, social media, volunteers, and homeschooling communities. After an initial release, the film was distributed in mainstream theaters by Freestyle Releasing. Profits from other films released alongside it were directed towards community projects, including an 82-acre sports park in Albany and initiatives like missions and a new church, supported by the co-writers team.

== Releases ==
Burns Family Studios released Beyond the Mask on April 6, 2015, and after increasing demand and talks with movie theaters, Following increasing demand, Burns Family Studios reached an agreement with film distributor Gathr to release the films to 111 movie theaters nationwide on June 5, 2015.

The film was to be released on DVD on Tuesday, September 8, 2015, in 3,900 Walmart stores across the U.S., but some didn't receive copies until a few days later due to a distribution problem. The DVD was also available on Amazon, ChristianCinema.com, and its own website (beyondthemaskmovie.com), along with a "making-of" book, soundtrack CD (which had been released substantially earlier), and other promotional merchandise.

To reach a wider audience through traditional theatrical release, Freestyle Releasing partnered with Stephen Kendrick, the film's co-writer, to handle its theatrical distribution. This likely involved securing screening deals with theaters, marketing and promotional activities, and other distribution logistics. Freestyle Releasing specializes in distributing independent and faith-based films, which aligns with the category of "Beyond the Mask." Their website, although lacking a dedicated page for the film anymore, showcases their focus on such films.

== Reception ==
Beyond The Mask received generally negative reviews from critics and positive reviews from Christian reviewers.

Review aggregator website Rotten Tomatoes reports a 29% approval rating with an average rating of 5.40/10 based on reviews from 14 critics. Christian movie review site, PluggedIn gave the film four out of five "Plugs" (Units for measuring family-friendliness). The Christian media site, BreatheCast gave the film four stars, saying "The movie's fight choreography and period costuming" are to be commended. With a slim budget of $4 million, Burns Family Productions manages to create a film that visually rivals many big budget movies of the same genre (such as 'The Count of Monte Cristo' and 'Zorro'). Justin Chang of Variety (magazine) gave the film a largely negative review, calling it a "a mostly stiff, infrequently stirring attempt to furnish a swashbuckling historical yarn for Christian audiences...onscreen memories...makes a pretty odd fit with Will’s spiritual journey." Chang was positive about the performances, calling the lead actors "likeable leads" and "Rhys Davies's...bellicose, two-dimensional villainy makes for undeniably enjoyable viewing."

Movieguide gave the film a largely negative review, concluding that “BEYOND THE MASK is a low quality movie. The story is drawn out for no apparent reason, and the production is television quality.” The Los Angeles Times, stated that the film seemed a "stagy, overstuffed costume drama". They also called the film "preachy" and complained of a "cut-and-paste script" by Stephen Kendrick and Paul McCusker that manages to drag into the fray Benjamin Franklin, who dutifully proceeds to offer up a medley of his greatest quotes."

The movie did poorly at the box office, grossing barely over a fourth of its budget.

== See also ==
- List of films about the American Revolution
- List of television series and miniseries about the American Revolution
