= The American Revolution (2014 miniseries) =

- Release poster
- Genre: Documentary
- Country of origin: United States
- Original language: English
- No. of series: 1
- No. of episodes: 3

Production
- Running time: 45 minutes

Original release
- Network: American Heroes Channel
- Release: December 15 – December 16, 2014

The American Revolution is an American three-part television series highlighting the origins and various events of the American Revolution. The series was broadcast on the American Heroes Channel. Its first two parts aired on December 15, 2014 and its final part aired on December 16, 2014.

The Siena College professor Jennifer Hull Dorsey, who serves as the McCormick Center for the Study of the American Revolution director, discussed the slave and spy James Armistead on the show. The series also discusses Founding Father Joseph Warren, who enlisted Paul Revere to take his midnight ride, and the spy John Honeyman.

== Episodes ==
No.	Title	Directed by	Written by	Original release date
1	"Rise of the Patriots"	Unknown	Unknown	December 15, 2014
2	"The Empire Fights Back"	Unknown	Unknown	December 15, 2014
3	"Return of the Rebels"	Unknown	Unknown	December 16, 2014

== Reception ==
In a mixed review, The New York Times television critic Neil Genzlinger said, ""The tales don’t go into much depth, and the re-enactments used to tell them are of uneven quality, but the selection earns points for variety." The Observer's Karen Zautyk said she learned about Peter Francisco through the "wonderful series", writing, "From it, I learned a great deal — including the fact that I didn’t know as much about our fight for liberty as I thought I did."

== See also ==
- List of television series and miniseries about the American Revolution
- List of films about the American Revolution
