= George Washington II: The Forging of a Nation =

- Genre: Drama; War
- Based on: Washington: the Indispensable Man by James Thomas Flexner
- Written by: Richard Fielder
- Directed by: William A. Graham
- Starring: Barry Bostwick; Patty Duke Astin
- Theme music composer: Bruce Broughton
- Country of origin: United States
- Original language: English
- No. of episodes: 2

Production
- Executive producer: David Gerber
- Producer: Richard Fielder
- Production locations: Colonial Williamsburg, Williamsburg, Virginia; Mount Vernon Estate - 3200 George Washington Memorial Parkway, Mount Vernon, Virginia; Philadelphia
- Cinematography: James Crabe
- Editors: Ronald J. Fagan; William B. Stich
- Running time: 190 minutes
- Production companies: David Gerber Productions; MGM/UA Television

Original release
- Network: CBS
- Release: September 21 – September 22, 1986

Related
- George Washington (1984)

George Washington II: The Forging of a Nation is a 1986 television film, and was the sequel to the 1984 miniseries George Washington. The film chronicles the life of George Washington, the first President of the United States. George Washington II: The Forging of a Nation is based on the biography by James Thomas Flexner.

It aired on September 21–22, 1986. The two-part sequel received low television ratings, among the worst ratings received by a miniseries to that time. It nevertheless received two nominations during the 39th Primetime Emmy Awards for Best Make-up and Best Hairstyling.

== Cast ==
- Barry Bostwick as George Washington – Commander-in-Chief of the Continental Army, and later first President of the United States
- Patty Duke Astin as Martha Washington – Wife of George Washington
- Jeffrey Jones as Thomas Jefferson
- Richard Bekins as Alexander Hamilton
- Penny Fuller as Eliza Powel
- Eve Gordon as Elizabeth Schuyler Hamilton
- Marcia Cross as Anne Bingham
- Guy Paul as James Madison
- Norman Snow as Edmund Randolph
- Lise Hilboldt as Maria Reynolds
- Haviland Morris as Henrietta Liston
- Daniel Davis as Patrick Henry
- Richard Fancy as William Duer
- Farnham Scott as Henry Knox
- Nicholas Kepros as John Jay

== See also ==
- We Fight to Be Free (2006 film)
- Washington (2020 miniseries)
- Cultural depictions of George Washington
- List of television series and miniseries about the American Revolution
- List of films about the American Revolution
