= Latin American revolutions =

Latin American revolutions may refer to:

- Spanish American wars of independence, 19th-century revolutionary wars against European colonial rule
- For other revolutions and rebellions in Latin America, see List of revolutions and rebellions
