= The American Revolution: A Constitutional Interpretation =

1923 book by Charles Howard McIlwain

- Author: Charles Howard McIlwain
- Language: English
- Genre: Non-fiction
- Publication place: United States

The American Revolution: A Constitutional Interpretation is a book by Charles Howard McIlwain. It won the 1924 Pulitzer Prize for History.
