= John Adams (miniseries) =

2008 US television miniseries of President John Adams's adult life

- Television promotional poster
- Based on: John Adams by David McCullough
- Written by: Kirk Ellis
- Directed by: Tom Hooper
- Starring: Paul Giamatti; Laura Linney; Stephen Dillane; David Morse; Tom Wilkinson; Danny Huston; Rufus Sewell; Justin Theroux; Guy Henry
- Theme music composer: Robert Lane; Joseph Vitarelli
- Country of origin: United States
- Original language: English
- No. of episodes: 7

Production
- Executive producers: Tom Hanks; Gary Goetzman
- Producers: David Coatsworth; Steve Shareshian
- Running time: 501 minutes
- Production companies: HBO Films; High Noon Productions; Playtone; Mid Atlantic Films
- Budget: $100 million

Original release
- Network: HBO
- Release: March 16 – April 27, 2008

John Adams is a 2008 American television miniseries chronicling the political and family life of U.S. Founding Father and president John Adams, detailing his many roles in the founding of the United States. The miniseries is directed by Tom Hooper and stars Paul Giamatti in the title role. Kirk Ellis wrote the screenplay based on the 2001 biography John Adams by David McCullough.

The biopic of Adams and the story of the first 50 years of the United States was broadcast in seven parts by HBO between March 16 and April 27, 2008. John Adams received generally positive reviews and many awards. The show won four Golden Globe awards and thirteen Emmy awards, more than any other miniseries in history.

== Summary ==
=== Part I: Join or Die (1770–1774) ===
In 1770 John Adams is a respected lawyer in his mid-30s known for his dedication to the law and justice. Adams is sought as a defense counsel for the soldiers involved in the Boston Massacre by their commander, Captain Thomas Preston. Reluctant at first, he agrees despite knowing this will antagonize his neighbors and friends.

Adams clashes with his cousin Samuel Adams over his decision to take the case. Samuel is one of the executive members of the Sons of Liberty, an organization dedicated to getting the colonies proper representation in the Parliament of Great Britain. After many sessions in court, the jury returns a verdict of not guilty of murder for each defendant, thanks to Adams' arguments.

Adams' friend Jonathan Sewall reveals that Massachusetts governor Francis Bernard and King George III have approved Adams' appointment to the Court of Admiralty. Adams wrestles with the decision, seeing fault both with the Sons of Liberty and with the British Crown, and ultimately refuses. He admits to his wife Abigail that he thinks the colony is in need of "strong governance" but that the Sons of Liberty are not up to the task.

After the Boston Tea Party, the Parliament of Great Britain passes the Intolerable Acts to the fury of the Sons of Liberty and many Bostonians. Samuel nominates Adams to represent Massachusetts in the First Continental Congress. Adams expresses doubt about its legality, but accepts. He reluctantly leaves a pregnant Abigail in Boston and departs for the Congress.

=== Part II: Independence (1775–1776) ===
In Philadelphia, Adams finds himself disappointed with both the Congress’ inability to make quick decisions and their unwillingness to support military action against Britain. His vocal dissent makes him unpopular among his fellow delegates, particularly John Dickinson of Pennsylvania, Edward Rutledge of South Carolina, and James Duane of New York.

The Adams family has moved back to their farm outside Boston for safety reasons as the conflict with Britain in Massachusetts has continued to escalate. Adams’ faith in Boston’s cause is renewed upon the victory of the Massachusetts militia in the Battles of Lexington and Concord.

At the Second Continental Congress, Adams finds allies in Benjamin Franklin, George Washington, and Thomas Jefferson. Most of the Congress nevertheless favor reconciliation with Britain and authorize the Olive Branch Petition. After the Battle of Bunker Hill, Adams is able to convince Congress to adopt the Massachusetts militia into a formal army and nominates Washington to lead it. The battle also causes King George to issue a Proclamation of Rebellion, which labels the colonists as traitors. Upon the reading of the Proclamation before Congress, Adams and Franklin rally the delegates to declare independence and propose an alliance with France.

Due to Adams' unpopularity and the powerful position held by Virginia, Jefferson is chosen to draft the Declaration of Independence. Adams delivers an impassioned speech before Congress, which sways the majority opinion in favor of the document. He reconciles with Rutledge, Duane, and Dickinson to achieve a unanimous vote. The Declaration is read both before the city of Philadelphia and across the country, including by the Adams family in Massachusetts.

=== Part III: Don't Tread on Me (1777–1781) ===
In Episode 3, Adams travels to Europe with his young son, John Quincy, during the Revolutionary War to seek alliances with foreign nations. En route, their ship battles a British frigate. It first shows Adams' embassy with Benjamin Franklin in the court of Louis XVI. The old French nobility, who are in the last decade before being consumed by the French Revolution, are portrayed as effete and decadent. They cheerfully meet Franklin, viewing him as a romantic figure, oblivious to the democratic infection he carries. Adams, on the other hand, is a plainspoken and faithful man who finds himself out of his depth surrounded by an entertainment- and sex-driven nature of the French elite.

Adams finds himself at sharp odds with Benjamin Franklin, who has adapted himself to the French, seeking to obtain by seduction what Adams would gain through histrionics. Franklin sharply rebukes Adams for his lack of diplomatic acumen, describing it as a "direct insult followed by a petulant whine." Franklin soon has Adams removed from any position of diplomatic authority in Paris. Franklin's approach is ultimately successful and results in the conclusive Franco-American victory at Yorktown.

Adams, chastened and dismayed but learning from his mistakes, then travels to the Dutch Republic to obtain money for the Revolution. Although the Dutch agree with the American cause, they do not consider the new union a reliable and creditworthy client. Adams ends his time in the Netherlands in a state of progressive illness, having sent his son away as a diplomatic secretary to the Russian Empire.

=== Part IV: Reunion (1781–1789) ===
In the fourth episode, John Adams receives news of the Revolutionary War's end and the British defeat. He is then sent to Paris to negotiate the Treaty of Paris in 1783. While overseas, John Adams spends time with Benjamin Franklin and Thomas Jefferson, and his wife, Abigail, visits him. Franklin informs John Adams that he was appointed as the first American Ambassador to Great Britain and thus has to relocate to London. John Adams is poorly received by the British during this time—he is the representative for a recently hostile power and represents in his person what many British at the time regarded as a disastrous end to their early Empire. He meets with his former sovereign, George III, and while the meeting is not a disaster, he is excoriated in British newspapers. In 1789, John Adams returns to Massachusetts for the first presidential election, where he and Abigail are reunited with their grown children. George Washington is elected as the first President of the United States, while John Adams is elected as the first Vice President.

Initially, Adams is disappointed and wishes to reject the post of Vice President because he feels there is a disproportionate number of electoral votes in favor of George Washington (Adams' number of votes pales in comparison to those for Washington). John feels the position of vice president is not a proper reflection of all the years of service he has dedicated to his nation but Abigail persuades him to accept the nomination.

=== Part V: Unite or Die (1788–1797) ===
The fifth episode begins with Vice President John Adams presiding over the Senate and the debate over what to call the new president. It depicts Adams as frustrated in this role: his opinions are ignored and he has no power, except in the case of a tied vote. He is excluded from George Washington's inner circle of cabinet members, and his relationships with Thomas Jefferson and Alexander Hamilton are strained. Even Washington gently rebukes him for his efforts to "royalize" the office of the presidency, although Washington values Adams' counsel in other areas, considering him to be "reasonable company" when compared with Jefferson and Hamilton. A key event shown is the struggle to enact the Jay Treaty with Britain, which Adams must ratify before a deadlocked Senate (although historically his vote was not required). The episode concludes with his inauguration as the second president—and his subsequent arrival in a plundered executive mansion.

=== Part VI: Unnecessary War (1797–1801) ===
The sixth episode covers Adams's term as president and the rift between the Hamilton-led Federalists and Jefferson-led Republicans. Adams's neutrality pleases neither side and often angers both. His shaky relationship with Vice President Thomas Jefferson worsens after Adams takes defensive actions against the French Republic, which are prompted by failed diplomatic attempts and the signing of the Alien and Sedition Acts. After taking all possible actions to prevent a war with France, Adams also alienates himself from the anti-French Alexander Hamilton. He disowns his son Charles, who soon dies as an alcoholic vagrant. Adams sees success late in his presidency with his campaign of preventing a war with France, but his success is clouded after losing the presidential election of 1800. After receiving much criticism while in office, Adams loses the election against his vice-president, Thomas Jefferson, and runner-up Aaron Burr (both from the same party). Adams leaves the Presidential Palace (now known as the White House) in March 1801 and retires to his personal life in Massachusetts.

=== Part VII: Peacefield (1803–1826) ===
The final episode covers Adams's retirement years. His home life at Peacefield is full of pain and sorrow as his daughter, Nabby, dies of breast cancer and Abigail succumbs to typhoid fever. Adams does live to see the election of his son, John Quincy, as president, but is too ill to attend the inauguration. Adams and Jefferson are reconciled through correspondence in their last years. Both die hours apart on July 4, 1826, the 50th anniversary of the Declaration of Independence. Jefferson and Adams were 83 and 90, respectively.

== Cast ==
- Paul Giamatti as John Adams
- Laura Linney as Abigail Adams
- Stephen Dillane as Thomas Jefferson
- David Morse as George Washington
- Tom Wilkinson as Benjamin Franklin
- Rufus Sewell as Alexander Hamilton
- Justin Theroux as John Hancock
- Danny Huston as Samuel Adams
- Sarah Polley as Abigail Adams Smith
- Andrew Scott as William Stephens Smith
- Željko Ivanek as John Dickinson
- Ebon Moss-Bachrach as John Quincy Adams
- John Dossett as Benjamin Rush
- Mamie Gummer as Sally Smith Adams
- Caroline Corrie as Louisa Adams
- Samuel Barnett as Thomas Adams
- Kevin Trainor as Charles Adams
- Tom Hollander as King George III
- Julian Firth as the Duke of Dorset
- Damien Jouillerot as King Louis XVI
- Clancy O'Connor as Edward Rutledge
- Guy Henry as Jonathan Sewall
- Brennan Brown as Robert Treat Paine
- Paul Fitzgerald as Richard Henry Lee
- Tom Beckett as Elbridge Gerry
- Del Pentecost as Henry Knox
- Tim Parati as Caesar Rodney
- John O'Creagh as Stephen Hopkins
- John Keating as Timothy Pickering
- Hugh O'Gorman as Thomas Pinckney
- Timmy Sherrill as Charles Lee
- Judith Magre as Madame Helvetius
- Jean-Hugues Anglade as Count of Vergennes
- Jean Brassard as Admiral d'Estaing
- Pip Carter as Francis Dana
- Sean McKenzie as Edward Bancroft
- Derek Milman as Lieutenant James Barron
- Patrice Valota as Jean-Antoine Houdon
- Nicolas Vaude as Chevalier de la Luzerne
- Bertie Carvel as Lord Carmarthen
- Alex Draper as Robert Livingston
- Cyril Descours as Edmond-Charles Genet
- Alan Cox as William Maclay
- Sean Mahan as Gen. Joseph Warren
- Eric Zuckerman as Thomas McKean
- Ed Jewett as James Duane
- Vincent Renart as Andrew Holmes
- Ritchie Coster as Captain Thomas Preston
- Lizan Mitchell as Sally Hemings
- Pamela Stewart as Patsy Jefferson
- Lucas N Hall as Continental Army Officer, New York light infantry battalion
- Steven Hinkle as Young John Quincy Adams
- Buzz Bovshow as John Trumbull

== Shooting locations ==
The 110-day shoot took place from 23 February to August 2007 in Colonial Williamsburg, Virginia; Richmond, Virginia; and Budapest, Hungary. Some European scenes were shot in Keszthely, Sóskút, Fertőd, and Kecskemét, Hungary.

A Continental Army war room was filmed in the Robert Carter house in Virginia. Williamsburg's Public Hospital served as the backdrop for the Continental Army's tent encampment, which Adams visited in the winter of 1776 and was replicated using special-effects snow. The College of William and Mary's Wren Building represented a Harvard interior. Scenes were also filmed at the Governor's Palace.

Sets, stage space, backlot, and production offices were housed in an old Mechanicsville AMF warehouse in Richmond, Virginia. Historic neighborhoods of Washington, D.C., Boston, and Philadelphia served as the backdrop for some street scenes featuring cobblestone pavements and colonial storefronts. The countryside surrounding Richmond in Hanover County and Powhatan County was chosen to represent areas surrounding early Boston, New York, and Philadelphia.

== Critical reception ==
The critical reception to the miniseries was predominantly positive. On review aggregator Rotten Tomatoes, the series has a rating of 82% based on 37 reviews, with an average rating of 8.56/10. The website's critics consensus reads: "Elegantly shot and relatively educational, John Adams is a worthy addition to the genre—though its casting leaves something to be desired." Metacritic assigned the series a weighted average score of 78 out of 100, based on 27 critics, indicating "generally favorable reviews".

Ken Tucker of Entertainment Weekly rated the miniseries A−, and Matt Roush of TV Guide praised the lead performances of Paul Giamatti and Laura Linney. David Hinckley of the New York Daily News felt John Adams "is, quite simply, as good as TV gets ... Best of all are two extraordinary performances at the center: Paul Giamatti as Adams and Laura Linney as his wife, Abigail ... To the extent that John Adams is a period piece, it isn't quite as lush as, say, some BBC productions. But it looks fine, and it feels right, and sometimes what's good for you can also be just plain good."

Alessandra Stanley of The New York Times had mixed feelings. She said the miniseries has "a Masterpiece Theatre gravity and takes a more somber, detailed and sepia-tinted look at the dawn of American democracy. It gives viewers a vivid sense of the isolation and physical hardships of the period, as well as the mores, but it does not offer significantly different or deeper insights into the personalities of the men — and at least one woman — who worked so hard for liberty ... [It] is certainly worthy and beautifully made, and it has many masterly touches at the edges, especially Laura Linney as Abigail. But Paul Giamatti is the wrong choice for the hero ... And that leaves the mini-series with a gaping hole at its center. What should be an exhilarating, absorbing ride across history alongside one of the least understood and most intriguing leaders of the American Revolution is instead a struggle."

Among those unimpressed with the miniseries were Mary McNamara of the Los Angeles Times and Tim Goodman of the San Francisco Chronicle. Both cited poor casting and the favoring of style over storytelling.

== Awards and nominations ==
Year	Award	Category	Nominee(s)	Result	Ref.
2008	Artios Awards	Outstanding Achievement in Casting – Mini Series	Kathleen Chopin	Won	
2008	Golden Nymph Awards	Best Mini Series		Won	
2008	Golden Nymph Awards	Outstanding Actor – Mini Series	Paul Giamatti	Won	
2008	Golden Nymph Awards	Outstanding Actor – Mini Series	Danny Huston	Nominated	
2008	Golden Nymph Awards	Outstanding Actor – Mini Series	David Morse	Nominated	
2008	Golden Nymph Awards	Outstanding Actor – Mini Series	Tom Wilkinson	Nominated	
2008	Hollywood Post Alliance Awards	Outstanding Audio Post – Television	Marc Fishman, Tony Lamberti, Stephen Hunter Flick, and Vanessa Lapato (for "Don't Tread on Me)	Nominated	
2008	Humanitas Prize	60 Minute Network or Syndicated Television	Kirk Ellis (for "Join or Die")	Won	
2008	International Film Music Critics Association Awards	Best Original Score for Television	Robert Lane and Joseph Vitarelli	Won	
2008	Online Film & Television Association Awards	Best Miniseries		Won	
2008	Online Film & Television Association Awards	Best Actor in a Motion Picture or Miniseries	Paul Giamatti	Won	
2008	Online Film & Television Association Awards	Best Actress in a Motion Picture or Miniseries	Laura Linney	Nominated	
2008	Online Film & Television Association Awards	Best Supporting Actor in a Motion Picture or Miniseries	Stephen Dillane	Nominated	
2008	Online Film & Television Association Awards	Best Supporting Actor in a Motion Picture or Miniseries	Željko Ivanek	Nominated	
2008	Online Film & Television Association Awards	Best Direction of a Motion Picture or Miniseries	Tom Hooper	Won	
2008	Online Film & Television Association Awards	Best Writing of a Motion Picture or Miniseries	Kirk Ellis and Michelle Ashford	Nominated	
2008	Online Film & Television Association Awards	Best Ensemble in a Motion Picture or Miniseries		Won	
2008	Online Film & Television Association Awards	Best Costume Design in a Motion Picture or Miniseries		Nominated	
2008	Online Film & Television Association Awards	Best Editing in a Motion Picture or Miniseries		Won	
2008	Online Film & Television Association Awards	Best Lighting in a Motion Picture or Miniseries		Nominated	
2008	Online Film & Television Association Awards	Best Makeup/Hairstyling in a Motion Picture or Miniseries		Won	
2008	Online Film & Television Association Awards	Best Music in a Motion Picture or Miniseries		Won	
2008	Online Film & Television Association Awards	Best Production Design in a Motion Picture or Miniseries		Nominated	
2008	Online Film & Television Association Awards	Best Sound in a Motion Picture or Miniseries		Nominated	
2008	Online Film & Television Association Awards	Best Visual Effects in a Motion Picture or Miniseries		Won	
2008	Primetime Emmy Awards	Outstanding Miniseries	Tom Hanks, Gary Goetzman, Kirk Ellis, Frank Doelger, David Coatsworth, and Steven Shareshian	Won	
2008	Primetime Emmy Awards	Outstanding Lead Actor in a Miniseries or a Movie	Paul Giamatti	Won	
2008	Primetime Emmy Awards	Outstanding Lead Actress in a Miniseries or a Movie	Laura Linney	Won	
2008	Primetime Emmy Awards	Outstanding Supporting Actor in a Miniseries or a Movie	Stephen Dillane	Nominated	
2008	Primetime Emmy Awards	Outstanding Supporting Actor in a Miniseries or a Movie	David Morse	Nominated	
2008	Primetime Emmy Awards	Outstanding Supporting Actor in a Miniseries or a Movie	Tom Wilkinson	Won	
2008	Primetime Emmy Awards	Outstanding Directing for a Miniseries, Movie or Dramatic Special	Tom Hooper	Nominated	
2008	Primetime Emmy Awards	Outstanding Writing for a Miniseries, Movie or Dramatic Special	Kirk Ellis (for "Independence")	Won	
2008	Primetime Creative Arts Emmy Awards	Outstanding Art Direction for a Miniseries or Movie	Gemma Jackson, David Crank, Christina Moore, Kathy Lucas, and Sarah Whittle	Won	
2008	Primetime Creative Arts Emmy Awards	Outstanding Casting for a Miniseries, Movie or Special	Kathleen Chopin, Nina Gold, and Tracy Kilpatrick	Won	
2008	Primetime Creative Arts Emmy Awards	Outstanding Cinematography for a Miniseries or Movie	Tak Fujimoto (for "Independence")	Won	
2008	Primetime Creative Arts Emmy Awards	Outstanding Cinematography for a Miniseries or Movie	Tak Fujimoto and Danny Cohen (for "Don't Tread on Me")	Nominated	
2008	Primetime Creative Arts Emmy Awards	Outstanding Costumes for a Miniseries, Movie or a Special	Donna Zakowska, Amy Andrews Harrell, and Clare Spragge (for "Reunion")	Won	
2008	Primetime Creative Arts Emmy Awards	Outstanding Hairstyling for a Miniseries or a Movie	Jan Archibald and Loulia Sheppard	Nominated	
2008	Primetime Creative Arts Emmy Awards	Outstanding Makeup for a Miniseries or a Movie (Non-Prosthetic)	Trefor Proud and John R. Bayless	Nominated	
2008	Primetime Creative Arts Emmy Awards	Outstanding Prosthetic Makeup for a Series, Miniseries, Movie or a Special	Trefor Proud, John R. Bayless, Christopher Burgoyne, and Matthew W. Mungle	Won	
2008	Primetime Creative Arts Emmy Awards	Outstanding Music Composition for a Miniseries, Movie or Special (Original Dramatic Score)	Robert Lane (for "Independence")	Nominated	
2008	Primetime Creative Arts Emmy Awards	Outstanding Single-Camera Picture Editing for a Miniseries or a Movie	Melanie Oliver (for "Independence")	Nominated	
2008	Primetime Creative Arts Emmy Awards	Outstanding Sound Editing for a Miniseries, Movie or a Special	Stephen Hunter Flick, Vanessa Lapato, Kira Roessler, Curt Schulkey, Randy Kelley, Ken Johnson, Paul Berolzheimer, Dean Beville, Bryan Bowen, Patricio Libenson, Solange S. Schwalbe, David Fein, Hilda Hodges, and Alex Gibson (for "Don't Tread on Me")	Won	
2008	Primetime Creative Arts Emmy Awards	Outstanding Sound Editing for a Miniseries, Movie or a Special	Jon Johnson, Bryan Bowen, Kira Roessler, Vanessa Lapato, Eileen Horta, Virginia Cook McGowan, Samuel C. Crutcher, Mark Messick, Martin Maryska, Greg Stacy, Patricio Libenson, Solange S. Schwalbe, David Fein, Hilda Hodges, and Nicholas Vitarelli (for "Unnecessary War")	Nominated	
2008	Primetime Creative Arts Emmy Awards	Outstanding Sound Mixing for a Miniseries or a Movie	Jay Meagher, Marc Fishman, and Tony Lamberti (for "Don't Tread on Me")	Won	
2008	Primetime Creative Arts Emmy Awards	Outstanding Sound Mixing for a Miniseries or a Movie	Jay Meagher, Michael Minkler, and Bob Beemer (for "Join or Die")	Nominated	
2008	Primetime Creative Arts Emmy Awards	Outstanding Special Visual Effects for a Miniseries, Movie or a Special	Erik Henry, Jeff Goldman, Paul Graff, Steve Kullback, Christina Graff, David Van Dyke, Robert Stromberg, Edwardo Mendez, and Ken Gorrell (for "Join or Die")	Won	
2008	Satellite Awards	Best Miniseries		Nominated	
2008	Satellite Awards	Best Actor in a Miniseries or Motion Picture Made for Television	Paul Giamatti	Won	
2008	Satellite Awards	Best Actress in a Miniseries or Motion Picture Made for Television	Laura Linney	Nominated	
2008	Satellite Awards	Best Actress in a Supporting Role in a Series, Miniseries or Motion Picture Made for Television	Sarah Polley	Nominated	
2008	Television Critics Association Awards	Program of the Year		Nominated	
2008	Television Critics Association Awards	Outstanding Achievement in Movies, Miniseries and Specials		Won	
2008	Television Critics Association Awards	Individual Achievement in Drama	Paul Giamatti	Won	
2009	American Cinema Editors Awards	Best Edited Miniseries or Motion Picture for Non-Commercial Television	Melanie Oliver (for "Independence")	Nominated	
2009	American Film Institute Awards	Top 10 Television Programs		Won	
2009	Art Directors Guild Awards	Excellence in Production Design Award – Television Movie or Mini-series	Gemma Jackson, David Crank, Christina Moore, John P. Goldsmith, Tibor Lázár, Dan Kuchar, Michael H. Ward, Ted Haigh, Richard Salinas, Kathy Lucas, and Sarah Whittle	Won	
2009	Cinema Audio Society Awards	Outstanding Achievement in Sound Mixing for Television Movies and Miniseries	Jay Meagher, Marc Fishman, and Tony Lamberti (for "Don't Tread on Me")	Nominated	
2009	Cinema Audio Society Awards	Outstanding Achievement in Sound Mixing for Television Movies and Miniseries	Jay Meagher, Michael Minkler, and Bob Beemer (for "Independence")	Nominated	
2009	Cinema Audio Society Awards	Outstanding Achievement in Sound Mixing for Television Movies and Miniseries	Jay Meagher, Michael Minkler, and Bob Beemer (for "Join or Die")	Won	
2009	Costume Designers Guild Awards	Outstanding Made for Television Movie or Miniseries	Donna Zakowska	Won	
2009	Critics' Choice Awards	Best Picture Made for Television		Won	
2009	Directors Guild of America Awards	Outstanding Directorial Achievement in Movies for Television or Miniseries	Tom Hooper	Nominated	
2009	Golden Globe Awards	Best Miniseries or Television Film		Won	
2009	Golden Globe Awards	Best Actor – Miniseries or Television Film	Paul Giamatti	Won	
2009	Golden Globe Awards	Best Actress – Miniseries or Television Film	Laura Linney	Won	
2009	Golden Globe Awards	Best Supporting Actor – Series, Miniseries or Television Film	Tom Wilkinson	Won	
2009	Gracie Awards	Outstanding Female Lead – Drama Special	Laura Linney	Won	
2009	Movieguide Awards	Faith & Freedom Award for Television		Won (Note: Tied with The Medal: Our Nation's Highest Honor.)	
2009	Producers Guild of America Awards	David L. Wolper Award for Outstanding Producer of Long-Form Television	David Coatsworth, Frank Doelger, Gary Goetzman, Tom Hanks, and Steven Shareshian	Won	
2009	Screen Actors Guild Awards	Outstanding Performance by a Male Actor in a Miniseries or Television Movie	Paul Giamatti	Won	
2009	Screen Actors Guild Awards	Outstanding Performance by a Male Actor in a Miniseries or Television Movie	Tom Wilkinson	Nominated	
2009	Screen Actors Guild Awards	Outstanding Performance by a Female Actor in a Miniseries or Television Movie	Laura Linney	Won	
2009	Visual Effects Society Awards	Outstanding Visual Effects in a Broadcast Miniseries, Movie, or Special	Steve Kullback, Eric Henry, Robert Stromberg, and Jeff Goldman (for "Join or Die")	Won	
2009	Visual Effects Society Awards	Outstanding Created Environment in a Broadcast Program or Commercial	Paul Graff, Robert Stromberg, and Adam Watkins (for "Join or Die" – Boston Harbor)	Won	
2009	Visual Effects Society Awards	Outstanding Compositing in a Broadcast Program or Commercial	Paul Graff, Joshua LaCross, and Matt Collorafice (for "Join or Die" – Boston Harbor)	Won	
2009	Writers Guild of America Awards	Long Form – Adaptation	Kirk Ellis (for "Join or Die" and "Independence"); Based on the book by David McCullough	Won	
2009	Young Artist Awards	Best Performance in a TV Movie, Miniseries or Special – Supporting Young Actor	Steven Hinkle	Nominated	
2019	Online Film & Television Association Awards	Hall of Fame – Television Programs		Inducted	

== Soundtrack ==
The score for the miniseries was composed by Robert Lane and Joseph Vitarelli. Lane wrote the main theme and scored "Join or Die," "Independence," "Unite or Die" and "Peacefield," with Vitarelli doing "Don't Tread on Me," "Reunion" and "Unnecessary War." The two composers worked independently of each other, with Lane writing and recording his segments in London and Vitarelli in Los Angeles. There are also pieces by classical composers, including Mozart, Boccherini, Gluck, Handel and Schubert. The soundtrack was released on the Varèse Sarabande label.

== Historical authenticity ==
The series deviates from David McCullough's book on several occasions, using creative license throughout.

=== Part I ===
- John Adams addresses Captain Preston immediately after the massacre, while deliberating whether to defend the soldier; he says: "As of this morning, five are dead". Only three men were killed immediately: Samuel Maverick died the next morning, and Patrick Carr did not die until two weeks later.
- Around the time of the trial, John Adams's son Charles is depicted playing with his sister, though he was not born until May 29, 1770 (making him still an infant). Likewise, his older son John Quincy Adams was born in July 1767, but he is depicted as a near-adolescent.
- Samuel Adams is depicted as disapproving of John Adams's decision to defend Captain Preston and the other Boston Massacre soldiers, when no other lawyer would act as their counsel. It is implied that the Sons of Liberty also disapproved, and that John for his part disapproved of their group. In fact, Samuel Adams encouraged his cousin John to take the case. John and other leading members of the Sons of Liberty also convinced Josiah Quincy II, another cousin who was a lawyer, to aid Adams in his preparation of the case.
- Captain Preston and the British soldiers involved in the Boston Massacre are shown being tried in a single trial in what seems to be the dead of winter, and declared not guilty of all charges. In actuality, Captain Preston's trial took place on October 24 and ran through October 29, when he was found not guilty. The eight soldiers were brought to trial weeks later in a separate trial that concluded on November 29. Six of the soldiers were found not guilty, but Hugh Montgomery and Matthew Killroy were convicted of manslaughter. They both received brands on their right thumbs as punishment.
- John Hancock is confronted by a British customs official, and he orders the crowd to "teach him a lesson, tar the bastard". Hancock and Samuel Adams then look on while the official is tarred and feathered, to the disapproval of John Adams. The scene is fictional and does not appear in McCullough's book. According to Samuel Adams biographer Ira Stoll, there is no evidence that Samuel Adams and John Hancock, who were opposed to mob violence, were ever present at a tarring and feathering, and so the scene succeeds in "tarring the reputations of Hancock and Samuel Adams". Jeremy Stern writes, "Despite popular mythology, tarrings were never common in Revolutionary Boston, and were not promoted by the opposition leadership. The entire sequence is pure and pernicious fiction." According to Stern, the scene is used to highlight a schism between Samuel and John Adams, which is entirely fictional.
- The tar and feather scene also improperly uses a black, modern tar. In reality, the liquid known as tar in the 18th century was pine tar, a liquid which is more often light-brown in color. The tar that we know today is actually called petroleum tar or bitumen. Pine tar also has a low melting point, and would not burn the skin the way that hot petroleum tar would.
- While in bed, Adams mentions his parents, saying his mother could not read. However, in his memoirs, John Adams himself wrote that "as my parents were both fond of reading...I was very early taught to read at home," indicating that his mother likely possessed at least a basic level of literacy. However, in the book McCullough does speculate that Adams's mother may have been illiterate, citing the lack of written correspondence either to or from her and evidence that she had letters read aloud to her.
- David McCullough's biography makes no mention of a pulpit speech by John Adams after being chosen, in summer 1774, to be one of Massachusetts' representatives to the First Continental Congress in Philadelphia. The text for that speech, at the end of Part I, comes mainly from two documents Adams penned during the Stamp Act crisis eight years earlier, apparently stitched together in the film so as to evoke the similar-sounding famous passage in the United States Declaration of Independence, about men being created equal and endowed thereby with unalienable rights. Adams (instead of Jefferson) might have served as lead author of the Declaration two years later, and might have foreshadowed key portions of it oratorically before leaving Massachusetts for Philadelphia, but actually did neither. The climactic final words of that speech, "Liberty will reign in America," appear to be a dramatic invention, not a passage Adams is known to have ever spoken or written.
- When Adams is set off to join the 1774 First Continental Congress, Abigail Adams is shown pregnant with a child. Adams is seen saying if the child was a girl, they would name her Elizabeth. While Abigail did give birth to a stillborn daughter they named Elizabeth, this happened in 1777, not 1774.

=== Part II ===
- In the opening scene, the final meeting site of the First Continental Congress is incorrectly shown as the Pennsylvania State House (now known as Independence Hall). In fact, the First Continental Congress was held in Carpenters' Hall, located approximately 250 yards (230 m) east of the state house, along Chestnut Street. Carpenters' Hall was and still is privately owned by The Carpenters' Company of the City and County of Philadelphia. It offered more privacy than the Pennsylvania State House. The venue depicted for the Second Continental Congress, however, is correctly depicted as the Pennsylvania State House.
- Benjamin Franklin is shown being brought to the Continental Congress in a litter, but he did not use this mode of transport in Philadelphia until the Constitutional Convention, 11 years later.
- John Adams did not ride to Lexington and Concord while the battle was still in progress; he visited on April 22, several days later.
- The first version of the Declaration of Independence read by Adams' family was depicted as a printed copy; in reality, it was a copy in Adams' own hand, which led Mrs. Adams to believe that he had written it himself.
- General Henry Knox's ox-driven caravan of cannon (taken from Fort Ticonderoga) is depicted passing by the Adams' house in Braintree, Massachusetts en route to Cambridge, Massachusetts. In reality, General Knox's caravan almost certainly did not pass through Braintree. Fort Ticonderoga is in upstate New York, northwest of Cambridge, and Knox is assumed to have taken the most likely routes of the day, from the New York border through western and central Massachusetts via what are now Routes 23, 9, and 20, never entering Braintree, which is located approximately 15 miles (24 km) southeast of Cambridge.
- General Knox is played by actor Del Pentecost (b. 1963), who at the time of filming was age 45, far older than the 25 years old that Henry Knox was in 1775.
- The illness of the daughter following the inoculation of smallpox was inaccurate. In fact, it was their son Charles who developed the pox and who was unconscious and delirious for 48 hours.

=== Part III ===
- Adams is shown departing for Europe without an upset nine-year-old son Charles, leaving only with older son John Quincy Adams. Adams actually took multiple trips to Europe. According to David McCullough's book, on one such trip young Charles accompanied his brother and father to Paris. He later became ill in Holland, and traveled alone on the troubled vessel South Carolina. After an extended journey of five months, Charles returned to Braintree at 11 years of age.
- During Adams's first voyage to France, his ship engages a British ship in a fierce battle while Adams assists a surgeon performing an amputation on a patient who dies. In reality, Adams helped perform the amputation several days after the capture of the British ship, following an unrelated accident. The patient died a week after the amputation, rather than during the operation as shown in the episode.

=== Part IV ===
- Abigail and John are depicted reuniting outside Paris after many years, but in reality were first reunited in London and traveled to Paris together.
- Abigail Adams is depicted reprimanding Benjamin Franklin for cheating on his wife in France, but his wife died seven years earlier in 1774.
- Abigail and John are depicted reuniting with their grown up children Nabby, John Quincy, Charles, and Thomas Boylston after returning to the United States, but in reality Nabby accompanied her mother Abigail to London where they reunited with John, and after joined by John Quincy, the four traveled to Paris where they stayed for a year until 1785 when John was appointed the first American ambassador to Great Britain, at which time Nabby accompanied her parents to England while John Quincy returned home to Massachusetts to attend Harvard.
- Multiple references are made in dialogue throughout the episode to the impending "Constitutional Convention." In reality, the Constitutional Convention was only referred to as such after it disbanded, since the Philadelphia convention was originally called only to revise the Articles of Confederation. When the Convention met, strict secrecy was imposed on its proceedings. It was only under this veil of secrecy that the convention goers changed their mission from one of revising the Articles to one of crafting a new constitution.

=== Part V ===
- Timothy Pickering is shown to be present during what appears intended to be the first cabinet meeting of the Washington administration; this is supported by dialogue during the meeting such as George Washington formally welcoming Thomas Jefferson, who was present at that first cabinet meeting, home from France. This meeting took place on November 26, 1791. Timothy Pickering was not present at this meeting, as he was not appointed to the cabinet until January 2, 1795, when he replaced Henry Knox as the Secretary of War. Additionally, Knox's apparent absence at the meeting is inaccurate.
- Vice President John Adams is shown casting the tiebreaker vote in favor of ratifying the Jay Treaty. In reality, his vote was never required as the Senate passed the resolution by 20–10. Furthermore, the vice president would never be required to cast a vote in a treaty ratification because Article II of the Constitution requires that treaties receive a two-thirds vote.
- Thomas Pinckney is portrayed as a Senator. Pinckney was never a Senator, though he would be appointed Ambassador to Great Britain by Washington in 1792.
- Nabby Adams meets and marries Colonel William Stephens Smith upon her parents' return to America from London. John Adams is depicted as refusing to use his influence to obtain political positions for his daughter's new husband, though Colonel Smith requests his father-in-law's assistance repeatedly with an almost grasping demeanor. Mr. Adams upbraids his son-in-law each time for even making the request, stating that Colonel Smith should find himself an honest trade or career and not depend upon speculation. In reality, Nabby met Colonel Smith abroad while her father was serving as United States minister to France and Great Britain, and the couple married in London prior to the end of John Adams' diplomatic posting to the Court of St. James. Both John and Abigail used their influence to assist Colonel Smith and obtain political appointments for him, although this did not curb Colonel Smith's tendency to invest unwisely.
- Following his election as president, John Adams is shown delivering his inauguration speech in the Senate chamber, on the second floor of Congress Hall, to an audience of senators. The speech was actually given in the much larger House of Representatives chamber on the first floor of Congress Hall. The room was filled to capacity with members of both the House and Senate, justices of the Supreme Court, heads of departments, the diplomatic corps, and others.

=== Part VI ===
- After President Adams refuses to assist Colonel Smith for the last time, Smith is depicted as leaving Nabby and their children in the care of the Adams family at Peacefield; according to the scene, his intention is to seek opportunities to the west and either return or send for his family once he can provide for them. In reality, Smith brought his family with him from one venture to the next, and Nabby only returned to her father's home in Massachusetts after it was determined that she would undergo a mastectomy rather than continue with the potions and poultices prescribed by other doctors at that time.
- After President Adams consults with his wife as to whether he should sign the laws, Adams is seen affixing his name to the ‘Punishment for Certain Crimes Against the United States’. In reality, it is entitled ‘An Act in addition to an Act entitled “An Act for the Punishment of Certain Crimes Against the United States”. The “Act for the Punishment of Certain Crimes Against the United States” was done during the second session of the first congress on April 30, 1790, by President Washington.
- Though Adams was inaugurated as president on March 4, 1797, Washington, DC would not become the capital city until November 1, 1800. John and Abigail Adams moved in to the President's House in Philadelphia where he had been inaugurated as it was still the temporary capital city. Adams had moved to a private home in Washington, DC during the summer of 1800 and under the provisions of the plans for Washington to become the capital, took up residency in the unfinished President's House (renamed the White House later in the century) on November 1, 1800. His wife was home in Quincy. She was not with him as depicted in the series. This is especially important to note because due to her not being with him, President Adams wrote a letter to Abigail on his second night in the mansion that included a very famous quote which President Franklin Roosevelt had inscribed in the fireplace mantle in the State Dining Room—"I pray Heaven to bestow the best of Blessings on this House and on all that shall hereafter inhabit it. May none but honest and wise Men ever rule under this roof."

=== Part VII ===
- Nabby is living with her family when she discerns the lump in her right breast, has her mastectomy, and dies two years later. Smith does not return until after Nabby's death and it is implied that he has finally established a stable form of income; whether he was returning for his family as he had promised or was summoned ahead of his own schedule by the Adamses pursuant to Nabby's death is not specified. Smith was with her during and after the mastectomy, and by all accounts had thrown himself into extensive research in attempts to find any reputable alternative to treating his wife's cancer via mastectomy. The mastectomy was not depicted in the series as it is described in historical documents. In fact, Nabby's tumor was in the left breast. She returned to the Smith family home after her operation and died in her father's home at Peacefield only because she expressed a wish to die there, knowing that her cancer had returned and would kill her, and her husband acceded to her request. Dr. Benjamin Rush was also not the surgeon who conducted the operation which was actually performed by the noted surgeon Dr. John Warren. Throughout the miniseries, Dr. Rush is shown making occasional house calls to the Adams residence. However, this is highly unlikely as Rush's practice was in far-away Philadelphia, not New England. That said, John and Abigail did consult with Rush regarding Nabby's condition, albeit this consultation was done through the mail.
- Adams is shown inspecting John Trumbull's painting Declaration of Independence (1817) and stating that he and Thomas Jefferson are the last surviving people depicted. This is inaccurate since Charles Carroll of Carrollton, who is also depicted in the painting, survived until 1832. In fact, Adams never made such a remark. In reality, when he inspected Trumbull's painting, Adams' only comment was to point to a door in the background of the painting and state, "When I nominated George Washington of Virginia for Commander-in-Chief of the Continental Army, he took his hat and rushed out that door."
- Benjamin Rush is portrayed as encouraging Adams to start a correspondence with Thomas Jefferson after the death of Abigail Adams. Abigail's death occurred in 1818 but the Adams-Jefferson correspondence started in 1812, and Rush died in 1813.

== See also ==
- List of television series and miniseries about the American Revolution
- List of films about the American Revolution
- List of Primetime Emmy Awards received by HBO
