= WBCN and the American Revolution =

WBCN and The American Revolution
- Directed by: Bill Lichtenstein
- Produced by: Bill Lichtenstein
- Cinematography: Boyd Estus; Rob Massey
- Edited by: Bill Lichtenstein; Tim Meagher
- Production companies: LCMedia Productions; Lichtenstein Creative Media
- Distributed by: Lichtenstein Creative Media
- Release date: 9 March 2019 (United States)
- Running time: 120 minutes
- Country: United States
- Language: English

WBCN and The American Revolution is a feature-length documentary film that chronicles progressive rock radio station WBCN-FM in Boston, during the years 1968 to 1974, through the original sights, sounds and stories, and examines the station's role in both covering and promoting the dramatic social, political and cultural changes that took place during that era. The film was produced and directed by Bill Lichtenstein with the Peabody Award-winning Lichtenstein Creative Media.

The film's use of crowdsourcing to collect archival material for its production and to raise the funds necessary to produce it has been called "A revolution in documentary filmmaking" by the American University Center for Social Media. In order to produce the film, tens of thousands of individual archival items, including photographs, audio recordings, film, video and memorabilia, were shared with the producers by members of the public. A collection of these items has been established at University of Massachusetts Amherst.
