= Liberty! =

- Written by: Ronald Blumer
- Directed by: Ellen Hovde; Muffie Meyer
- Music by: Mark O'Connor
- Original language: English

Production
- Producers: Ellen Hovde; Muffie Meyer
- Cinematography: James Brown; Robert Elfstrom; Boyd Estus; Tom Hurwitz; Joel Shapiro; Joe Vitagliano
- Editors: Eric Davies; Donna Marino; Sharon Sachs
- Running time: 360 minutes
- Production company: Middlemarch Films

Original release
- Network: PBS
- Release: November 23 – November 25, 1997

Liberty! The American Revolution is a six-hour documentary miniseries about the Revolutionary War, and the instigating factors, that brought about the United States' independence from the Kingdom of Great Britain. It was first broadcast on the Public Broadcasting Service in 1997.

The series consists of six hour-long episodes. Each episode is introduced by Forrest Sawyer and narrated by Edward Herrmann. Period photographs and location filming are intercut with stage and screen actors in appropriate period costume reading as figures of the time, including Campbell Scott (Thomas Jefferson), Philip Bosco (Benjamin Franklin), Victor Garber (John Dickinson), Alex Jennings (King George III), Roger Rees (Thomas Paine), Philip Seymour Hoffman (Joseph Plumb Martin), Terrence Mann (Gen. John Burgoyne), Colm Feore (Alexander Hamilton), Sebastian Roché (The Marquis de Lafayette), Donna Murphy (Abigail Adams), Austin Pendleton (Benjamin Rush) and Peter Donaldson (John Adams). Stephen Lang read the words of George Washington, but is not seen on camera.

British and American historians and authors, including Carol Berkin, Bernard Bailyn, Ron Hoffman, Claude-Anne Lopez, Pauline Maier, George C. Neumann, Richard Norton Smith, Gordon S. Wood (U.S.) and Jeremy Black, Colin Bonwick, John Keegan, and N.A.M. Rodger (U.K.) add historical background, explaining life and society of the time while interpreting events from the perspectives of the two sides of the conflict. Historical perspectives also include the status of black slaves and freemen, the participation of American Indians, and the strivings of American women as events progress.

== Episodes ==
No.	Title	Original release date
1	"The Reluctant Revolutionaries"	November 23, 1997
Topics covered: Life as British colonists, the Stamp Act, the Declaratory Act, the Boston Massacre, taxation without representation, and the Boston Tea Party.
2	"Blows Must Decide"	November 23, 1997
Topics covered: The Coercive/Intolerable Acts, military reinforcement of Boston, the first Continental Congress, the battles of Lexington and Concord and the Battle of Bunker Hill, loyalists and the Olive Branch Petition, Common Sense, and the Declaration of Independence.
3	"The Times That Try Men's Souls"	November 24, 1997
Topics covered: Arrival of General Howe, Washington's formation of an American army, division of colonies as patriot or loyalist, the defense of New York, the fall of New Jersey, The American Crisis, the crossing of the Delaware River, and the Battle of Trenton.
4	"O, Fatal Ambition!"	November 24, 1997
Topics covered: General Burgoyne's incursion from the north (and eventual surrender), the fall of Fort Ticonderoga, the war in New England, the Battle of Brandywine Creek, the Battle of Saratoga, and the establishment of the Franco-American alliance.
5	"The World That Turned Upside Down"	November 25, 1997
Topics covered: Gen. Clinton's campaign in the south, the siege of Charleston, Gen. Cornwallis's strategy to conquer the south, Benedict Arnold's defection to the British Army, General Rochambeau's supply of reinforcements to Washington's army, Gen. Nathanael Greene's campaign to reclaim the south, the Battle of Yorktown, and the Treaty of Paris.
6	"Are We to Be a Nation?"	November 25, 1997
Topics covered: Creation of the United States, Washington's resignation from his commission, Noah Webster's standardization of American English, Shays' Rebellion, the Confederation Congress, Alexander Hamilton and James Madison's combined vision for a new system of government, the ratification of the Constitution and the Bill of Rights, and the formation of the United States government.

== Music ==
American singer-songwriter James Taylor sings the traditional song "Johnny Has Gone for a Soldier" during the end credits. Original music was composed by violinist Mark O'Connor, who accompanies Taylor; the score, which blends new and traditional music, was performed by O'Connor, Taylor, cellist Yo-Yo Ma, trumpet player Wynton Marsalis and the Nashville Symphony. A collection of the music from the soundtrack was released as a companion album in 1997.

== Production information ==
Liberty! was produced for Public Broadcasting Service (PBS) by Twin Cities Public Television (TPT), and won a George Foster Peabody Award. The directors were Ellen Hovde and Muffie Meyer, who also collaborated on the 2002 TPT production Benjamin Franklin.

== See also ==
- List of television series and miniseries about the American Revolution
- List of films about the American Revolution
