= The American Revolution: A Global War =

Non-fiction book

American Revolution: A Global War
- First edition
- Author: R. Ernest Dupuy, Gay Hammerman, Grace P. Hayes
- Language: English
- Genre: Non-fiction
- Publisher: David McKay Publications
- Publication date: 1977
- ISBN: 0679506489
- OCLC: 02597513

The American Revolution: A Global War is a 1977 non-fiction book by R. Ernest Dupuy, Gay Hammerman, and Grace P. Hayes. It was published through David McKay Publications and makes the argument that the American Revolutionary War should be seen primarily as an international world war between the European great powers. This is in contrast to the traditional American view of focusing mainly on the land-conflict between the colonials and the British Empire. The authors concentrate primarily on the European campaigns in which Britain faced the threat of an invasion from the Second Armada led by Spain and France. The global war also included the renewed Anglo-Dutch conflict, and the naval war in the Caribbean Sea and India.

Kirkus Reviews gave a positive review for the book upon its initial release, calling it a "valuable chronicle".
