= Catherine Ray =

English writer (born c. 1830)

- Born: c. 1830; Suffolk, UK
- Died: unknown
- Occupation(s): Traveller, writer, teacher, social & political reformer, translator

Catherine Ray (b. circa 1830) was a traveller, writer, teacher, social and political reformer, and the earliest English translator of Ibsen.

== Life ==
Catherine Ray was born and raised in Suffolk. Her father died when she was three, and she was repeatedly ill in childhood. Following the death of her mother, whom Catherine nursed in her final illness, she began a twenty five year period of frequent travel, visiting Scandinavia, Russia, continental Europe and Australia. She lectured in both English and Italian, and in the mid-1870s was involved in the Association for the University Education of Women while resident in Edinburgh. She became committed to the promotion of women's civil and political rights, of temperance, and the Charity Organisation Society. She was also an active member of the Primrose League during her time living in Hampstead around 1890. To an interviewer in 1890 she said of herself and her beliefs:

"You may think me a strange compound. I am a staunch Conservative, an upholder of the Reformed Church of England, a consistent teetotaller, and a Socialist in so far as I believe that love and sympathy with the sufferings of our poorer brethren should determine the actions of all; true progress for them and us lies in helping them to help themselves; in so far as this is Socialism, I am a Socialist. I am loyal to the backbone, and my hope lies in the womanhood of the world!"

Her date of death is not known.

== Writing ==
Catherine Ray began her literary career with a translation of Henrik Ibsen's play Emperor and Galilean (1873). Ray's translation appeared in 1876, and was the earliest published English translation of one of Ibsen's plays. As Katherine Newey notes, Ray's introduction to her translation "constitutes the earliest English-language analysis of Ibsen's theatre". Although Ray herself asserted that it had '"received very favourable press notices", one of Ray's contemporaries commented on the subsequent neglect shown to her pioneering work:

"I have not noticed that any of the critics have mentioned the fact that Miss Ray was the first to introduce Ibsen to the English public. I am afraid she found that her efforts were not appreciated."

Ray followed up her translation with a series of novels, including a work for children set in Norway, a 'temperance novel' set largely in Edinburgh, and a further book set in the Tyrol. Of this, her final novel, a reviewer in The County Gentleman commented:

"The author of 'A New Exodus' shows a strong feeling for Nature as she reveals herself in the glorious mountains and fair valleys of beautiful Tyrol. The odour of heath and pine seems to stir these pages like a living breath, and the magnificent panorama of the Alpine scenery forms a fitting framework for a picture of noble constancy and endurance."

Writing in The Academy, William Wallace acknowledged:

"Altogether 'The Exiles of the Zillerthal', unambitious as it is, and suggestive, as regards its author, of literary power in reserve, may, without exaggeration, be described as a model story of its class."

== Works ==
- "Catalan Bay: A Story of Gibraltar", The Monthly Packet, 1872
- Henrik Ibsen, The Emperor and the Galilean, trans. Catherine Ray. London: Samuel Tinsley, 1876.
- A Farm on the Fjord: A Tale of Life in Norway. London and Edinburgh, 1877.
- "Edelraute; or Five and Twenty Years Ago at the Achen See", The Ladies' Edinburgh Magazine, vol. 3, 1877.
- Aground in the Shallows. 2 vols. London: Remington, 1879.
- A New Exodus; or, the Exiles of the Zillerthal. A story of the Protestants of the Tyrol. London: Nisbet and Co, 1887
