= Benjamin Franklin (miniseries) =

- Also known as: The Lives of Benjamin Franklin
- Genre: Biography; Drama; History
- Written by: Loring Mandel; Howard Fast; Loring Mandel
- Directed by: Glenn Jordan
- Starring: Willie Aames; Eddie Albert; Beau Bridges; Lloyd Bridges; Melvyn Douglas; Richard Widmark
- Theme music composer: Billy Goldenberg
- Country of origin: United States
- Original language: English
- No. of episodes: 4

Production
- Executive producer: Lewis Freedman
- Producers: Glenn Jordan; George Lefferts
- Running time: 360 minutes

Original release
- Network: CBS
- Release: November 21, 1974 – January 28, 1975

The Lives of Benjamin Franklin is a 1974 American television miniseries that chronicles the life of Benjamin Franklin.

The series was broadcast by CBS and won five Emmy Awards, including the award for Outstanding Limited Series. Howard Fast won the Emmy for Outstanding Writing for a Drama Series for the first installment (The Ambassador). Glenn Jordan was also nominated for Outstanding Directing for a Drama Series for The Ambassador episode, and Loring Mandel was nominated for Outstanding Writing for a Drama Series for the episode "The Whirlwind".

The four 90-minute episodes debuted on November 21 and December 17, 1974, and January 9 and 28, 1975.

== Cast ==
- Willie Aames as Franklin at age 12
- Beau Bridges as Franklin the young man
- Richard Widmark as Franklin the rebel
- Eddie Albert as Franklin at age 72
- Lloyd Bridges as Franklin the diplomat
- Melvyn Douglas as Franklin the elder statesman
- Susan Sarandon as younger Deborah Franklin
- Sheree North as older Deborah Franklin

== See also ==
- List of films about the American Revolution
- List of television series and miniseries about the American Revolution
- Benjamin Franklin, 2002 TV series
- Benjamin Franklin, 2022 documentary film
- Franklin, 2024 miniseries
