= The American Revolution; Written in the Style of Ancient History =

1793 book on American revolution

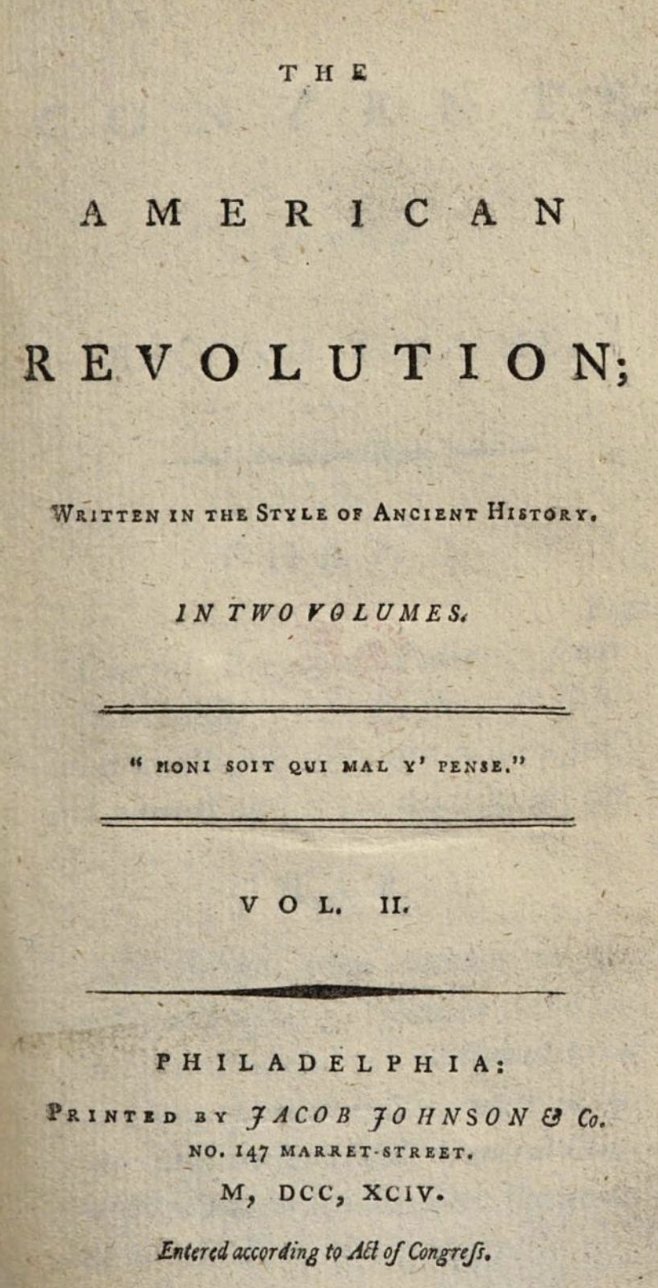
- Title page of volume II
- Author: Richard Snowden
- Genre: Pseudo-biblicism
- Published: 1793

The American Revolution; Written in the Style of Ancient History is a 1793 account of the American Revolution written by Richard Snowden (1753–1825). An example of "pseudo-biblicism", it imitates the language of the King James Version of the Bible.

== Overview ==
Despite adopting a biblical style, the work is relatively devoid of religious material, like most pseudo-biblical works. The work was aimed at schoolchildren, with Snowden writing that the style was chosen as the style "most suitable to the capacities of young people". The work was published with verse numbers and uses English of the Jacobean Era, similar to that found in the King James Version of the Bible published in 1611.

In the work, modern place names are replaced with archaic-sounding names, e.g. France is called Gaul.

== Sources ==
- Raphael, Ray (2014). Founding Myths: Stories that Hide Our Patriotic Past (Revised ed.). The New Press. ISBN 978-1595589491.
- Remer, Rosalind (1996). Printers and Men of Capital: Philadelphia Book Publishers in the New Republic. University of Pennsylvania Press. ISBN 0-8122-3337-9.
- Shalev, Eran (2009). Rome Reborn on Western Shores: Historical Imagination and the Creation of the American Republic. University of Virginia Press. p. 202. ISBN 978-0-8139-2839-5.
- Shalev, Eran (2014). American Zion: The Old Testament as a Political Text from the Revolution to the Civil War. Yale University Press. ISBN 978-0300205909.
