= Franklin (miniseries) =

- Promotional poster
- Genre: Biographical drama
- Based on: A Great Improvisation: Franklin, France, and the Birth of America by Stacy Schiff
- Written by: Kirk Ellis and Howard Korder
- Directed by: Tim Van Patten
- Starring: Michael Douglas; Noah Jupe; Daniel Mays; Ludivine Sagnier; Thibault de Montalembert; Assaad Bouab; Théodore Pellerin; Tom Hughes; Jeanne Balibar; Eddie Marsan
- Theme music composer: Jay Wadley
- Country of origin: United States
- Original languages: English; French
- No. of episodes: 8

Production
- Executive producers: Kirk Ellis; Howard Korder; Tim Van Patten; Michael Douglas; Tony Krantz; Mark Mostyn; Richard Plepler
- Running time: 60 minutes
- Production companies: Flame Ventures; EDEN Productions; Shadowcatcher Productions; Boil Some Water Entertainment; ITV Studios America

Original release
- Network: Apple TV+
- Release: April 12 – May 17, 2024

Franklin is a 2024 biographical drama television miniseries about the United States Founding Father Benjamin Franklin, based on Stacy Schiff's 2005 book A Great Improvisation: Franklin, France, and the Birth of America. It was released on Apple TV+ on April 12, 2024. The series depicts the eight years Benjamin Franklin spent in France to convince King Louis XVI to support the burgeoning United States in the American Revolutionary War.

== Cast ==
=== Main ===
- Michael Douglas as Benjamin Franklin
- Noah Jupe as William Temple Franklin
- Daniel Mays as Edward Bancroft
- Ludivine Sagnier as Anne Louise Brillon de Jouy
- Thibault de Montalembert as Charles Gravier, comte de Vergennes
- Assaad Bouab as Pierre Beaumarchais
- Théodore Pellerin as Gilbert du Motier, Marquis de Lafayette
- Tom Hughes as Paul Wentworth
- Jeanne Balibar as Anne-Catherine de Ligniville, Madame Helvétius
- Eddie Marsan as John Adams

=== Recurring ===
- Olivier Claverie as Jacques-Donatien Le Ray de Chaumont
- Aïtor de Calvairac as Jacques "James" Le Ray de Chaumont
- Lily Dupont as Cunégonde Brillon
- Marc Duret as Monsieur Brillon
- Ed Stoppard as John Jay
- Jack Archer as Thomas Grenville
- Gary Lewis as Richard Oswald
- Tom Pezier as Louis XVI, King of France
- Patrick Kennedy as Strachey

=== Guest ===
- Florence Darel as Therese Chaumont
- Olivier Rabourdin as Jean-Charles-Pierre Lenoir
- Yves Heck as Royal Chamberlain
- Maria Dragus as Marie Antoinette
- John Hollingworth as David Murray, Lord Stormont
- Romain Brau as Chevalier d'Éon

== Episodes ==
No.	Title	Directed by	Written by	Original release date
1	"Sauce for Prayers"	Tim Van Patten	Kirk Ellis and Howard Korder	April 12, 2024
As the fight for independence teeters on the brink of defeat, Benjamin Franklin and his grandson plunge into a world of intrigue and deception.
2	"Welcome, Mischief"	Tim Van Patten	Kirk Ellis and Howard Korder	April 12, 2024
An arms operation is threatened by a ruthless opponent. The Paris police watch Franklin’s every move. Temple makes a confession.
3	"Pride and Gout"	Tim Van Patten	Kirk Ellis and Howard Korder	April 12, 2024
Bad news arrives from America. Franklin finds himself ensnared in the traps of Versailles. Temple bows down before a star.
4	"Small Revenge"	Tim Van Patten	Kirk Ellis and Howard Korder	April 19, 2024
Franklin pays back an insult and receives the favour of a king; a new lover catches Franklin's eye and an old rival turns up to thwart him.
5	"The Natural State of Man"	Tim Van Patten	Kirk Ellis and Howard Korder	April 26, 2024
Tensions mount between Franklin and Adams. Madame Brillon asserts her power. Temple decides to fight his own war.
6	"Beauty and Folly"	Tim Van Patten	Kirk Ellis and Howard Korder	May 3, 2024
Franklin suspects traitors are everywhere. Vergennes makes a final offer. Jacques introduces Temple to the thrill of the hunt.
7	"Begin by Creeping"	Tim Van Patten	Kirk Ellis and Howard Korder	May 10, 2024
After victory at Yorktown, the Americans and the French plot against each other for the upper hand. Franklin is laid low at a crucial moment.
8	"Think of Three Things"	Tim Van Patten	Kirk Ellis and Howard Korder	May 17, 2024
The future of the United States is decided by six men in a room. Franklin and Temple face a changed world.

== Production ==
It was announced in February 2022 that Michael Douglas would star in the series as Benjamin Franklin for Apple TV+, with Kirk Ellis writing the series and Tim Van Patten directing. In June 2022, it was announced that Howard Korder had joined the production as a writer and executive producer.

Filming began in June 2022 in Versailles, with Noah Jupe, Ludivine Sagnier, Daniel Mays, Assaad Bouab and Eddie Marsan amongst additional casting announced.

== Reception ==
=== Critical response ===
On review aggregator Rotten Tomatoes, 71% of 35 critics gave the series a positive review, with an average rating of 6.5/10. The critical consensus reads, "Franklin's unhurried retelling of revolutionary history can be dry as parchment, but Michael Douglas' sly performance as the founding father gives it a compelling jolt." On Metacritic, the series holds a weighted average score of 57 out of 100 based on 22 critics, indicating "mixed or average reviews".

== See also ==
- List of films about the American Revolution
- List of television series and miniseries about the American Revolution
- Benjamin Franklin, 1974 miniseries
- Benjamin Franklin, 2002 TV series
- Benjamin Franklin, 2022 two-part documentary
