= List of films about the American Revolution =

Below is an incomplete list of films which include events of the American Revolution.

== 1910s ==
Year	Country	Main title (Alternative title)	Original title (Original script)	Director	Subject
1914	United States	The Spy		Otis Turner	Drama, war. Based on the 1821 novel The Spy.
1915	United States	A Continental Girl		Joseph Adelman	Drama, war.
1916	United States	The Heart of a Hero		Emile Chautard	Drama, war. Based on the play Nathan Hale. Nathan Hale
1917	United States	Betsy Ross		Travers Vale; George Cowl	Biography, drama, romance.
1917	United States	The Spirit of '76		Frank Montgomery	Drama, history, war.
1918	United States	The Beautiful Mrs. Reynolds		Arthur Ashley	Drama, history.

== 1920s ==
Year	Country	Main title (Alternative title)	Original title (Original script)	Director	Subject
1922	United States	Cardigan		John W. Noble	Drama. Based on the novel Cardigan.
1924	United States	Janice Meredith		E. Mason Hopper; E. J. Babille	Drama, history, romance, war. Based on a novel and the play Janice Meredith.
1924	United States	America		D. W. Griffith	Drama, history, war. Based on the novel The Reckoning.
1929	United Kingdom	The American Prisoner		Thomas Bentley	Drama. Based on the 1904 novel The American Prisoner.

== 1930s ==
Year	Country	Main title (Alternative title)	Original title (Original script)	Director	Subject
1931	United States	Alexander Hamilton		John G. Adolfi	Biography, Drama, history. Based on the 1917 play Hamilton. Alexander Hamilton
1934	United States	The Pursuit of Happiness		Alexander Hall	Comedy, romance. Hessian
1936	United States	Daniel Boone		David Howard	Biography, family, western. Daniel Boone, Simon Girty
1936	United States	Give Me Liberty		B. Reeves Eason	Events surrounding Patrick Henry's "Give me liberty or give me death!" speech
1938	United States	Declaration of Independence		Crane Wilbur	Drama, Academy Award winning short film
1939	United States	Drums Along the Mohawk		John Ford	Drama, romance, war, western. Based on the 1936 novel Drums Along the Mohawk.
1939	United States	Sons of Liberty		Michael Curtiz	Drama, Academy Award winning short film based on the life of Haym Salomon, American patriot and a financier of the Revolution

== 1940s ==
Year	Country	Main title (Alternative title)	Original title (Original script)	Director	Subject
1940	United States	The Howards of Virginia		Frank Lloyd	Drama, history, war. Based on a novel The Tree of Liberty.

== 1950s ==
Year	Country	Main title (Alternative title)	Original title (Original script)	Director	Subject
1950	United States	Bunker Hill Bunny		Friz Freleng	Animated short featuring Bugs Bunny
1953	United States	Sangaree		Edward Ludwig	Drama, history. Based on the novel Sangaree.
1954	United States	Yankee Doodle Bugs		Friz Freleng	Animated short featuring Bugs Bunny
1955	United States	The Scarlet Coat		John Sturges	Adventure, drama, history, romance, war. Benedict Arnold
1956	United States	Daniel Boone, Trail Blazer		Albert C. Gannaway; Ismael Rodríguez	Drama, western. Daniel Boone
1957	United States	Johnny Tremain		Robert Stevenson	Adventure, family, war. Based on a novel Johnny Tremain.
1959	United Kingdom; United States	The Devil's Disciple		Guy Hamilton	Comedy, history, romance, war. Based on the 1897 play The Devil's Disciple.
1959	Spain; United States	John Paul Jones		John Farrow	Action, biography, history, romance, war. Based on the story "Nor'wester". John Paul Jones

== 1960s ==
Year	Country	Main title (Alternative title)	Original title (Original script)	Director	Subject
1961	France; Italy	La Fayette		Jean Dréville	Biography, drama, history, war. Gilbert du Motier

== 1970s ==
Year	Country	Main title (Alternative title)	Original title (Original script)	Director	Subject
1970	Italy	Paths of War	Franco e Ciccio sul sentiero di guerra	Aldo Grimaldi	Comedy, western.
1972	United States	1776		Peter H. Hunt	Drama, family, history, musical. Based on the 1969 musical 1776.
1975	United States	Valley Forge		Fielder Cook	Drama, war. Based on the 1934 play Valley Forge.
1976	United States	Spirit of Seventy Sex		Stu Segall	Adult, comedy, history.
1976	United States	Pinky Doodle		Sid Marcus	Animated short featuring the Pink Panther
1978	United States	Yankee Doodle Pink		Sid Marcus	Animated short featuring the Pink Panther - remake of Pinky Doodle

== 1980s ==
Year	Country	Main title (Alternative title)	Original title (Original script)	Director	Subject
1985	United Kingdom; Norway	Revolution		Hugh Hudson	Adventure, drama, history, war.
1989	United States	A More Perfect Union		Peter N. Johnson	Drama, history. Constitutional Convention

== 1990s ==
Year	Country	Main title (Alternative title)	Original title (Original script)	Director	Subject
1995	United States	The Little Patriot		J. Christian Ingvordsen	Family, adventure.
1996	France	Beaumarchais	Beaumarchais l'insolent	Édouard Molinaro	Adventure, comedy, history, romance. Based on the play Beaumarchais. Pierre Beaumarchais

== 2000s ==
Year	Country	Main title (Alternative title)	Original title (Original script)	Director	Subject
2000	United States; Germany	The Patriot		Roland Emmerich	Action, drama, history, war.
2003	United States	The Deserter		Eric Bruno Borgman	Comedy, drama, history, war.
2009	United States	All for Liberty		Chris Weatherhead	Drama

== 2010s ==
Year	Country	Main title (Alternative title)	Original title (Original script)	Director	Subject
2010	United States	Sybil Ludington		Kim Robinson	Drama, family, history. Sybil Ludington
2015	United States	Beyond the Mask		Chad Burns	Action, adventure, drama, romance.
2016	United States	The Culper Spy Adventure		James Canale III; Michael Tessler; Andrew Mastronardi	History.
2017	United States	One Life to Give		Leah Dunaief; Michael Tessler; Benji Dunaief	History.

== 2020s ==
Year	Country	Main title (Alternative title)	Original title (Original script)	Director	Subject
2020	United States	Hamilton		Thomas Kail	War, Alexander Hamilton. Filming of the 2015 musical
2023	United States	The Battle of Camden		Christopher Forbes	War. Battle of Camden
2025	United States	Rise and Fight: The Battle of Hobkirk's Hill		Christopher Forbes	Drama. Battle of Hobkirk's Hill

== Fantasy ==
Year	Country	Main title (Alternative title)	Original title (Original script)	Director	Subject
1945	United States	Where Do We Go from Here?		Gregory Ratoff	Fantasy, musical.
1946	United States	The Time of Their Lives		Charles Barton	Comedy, family, fantasy.

== Television films ==
Year	Country	Main title (Alternative title)	Original title (Original script)	Director	Subject
1975	United States	First Ladies Diaries: Martha Washington		John J. Desmond	Biography, drama. Martha Washington
1976	United States	The Other Side of Victory		Bill Jersey	
1986	United States	George Washington II: The Forging of a Nation		William A. Graham	Biography, drama, history. George Washington
1988	United States; Canada	April Morning		Delbert Mann	Drama, history, war. Based on the novel April Morning. Battles of Lexington and Concord
1990	Canada	Divided Loyalties		Mario Azzopardi	Biography. Joseph Brant, Molly Brant
1993	United States	The Broken Chain		Lamont Johnson	Drama, war, action. Joseph Brant
1994	Canada	Mary Silliman's War		Stephen Surjik	Drama, history, war. Based on biography The Way of Duty. Mary Silliman
1995	United States	Taking Liberty		Stuart Gillard	Drama. Based on an unknown story.
2000	United States	The Crossing		Robert Harmon	Biography, drama, history, war. Based on the novel The Crossing. George Washington's crossing of the Delaware River, Battle of Trenton
2003	United States	Benedict Arnold: A Question of Honor		Mikael Salomon	Drama, history. Benedict Arnold
2005	United States	Felicity: An American Girl Adventure		Nadia Tass	Drama, family. Based on the novels about American Girl.

== TV series ==
Year	Country	Main title (Alternative title)	Original title (Original script)	Original network	Director	Subject
1959-1961	United States	The Swamp Fox (part of Walt Disney Presents anthology)		ABC	Harry Keller	Adventure, drama, family. Francis Marion, Banastre Tarleton
1964-1970	United States	Daniel Boone		NBC		Adventure, western. Daniel Boone
1970-1971	United States	The Young Rebels		ABC	Harve Bennett	Adventure.
1974	United States	Benjamin Franklin		CBS	Glenn Jordan	Biography, drama, history. Benjamin Franklin
1976	United States	The Adams Chronicles		WNET 13/New York City (PBS)		Drama, history. John Adams
1978	United States	The Bastard		Operation Prime Time	Lee H. Katzin	Drama, history, romance. Based on the 1974 novel The Bastard.
1979	United States	The Rebels		Fourth Television Network	Russ Mayberry	Drama, history, war. Based on the 1975 novel The Rebels.
1979	United States	The Seekers		HBO	Sidney Hayers	Drama, history, war. Based on the 1975 novel The Seekers.
1982	East Germany	The great adventure of Kaspar Schmeck	Das große Abenteuer des Kaspar Schmeck		Gunter Friedrich	Adventure, drama, war. Based on a novel Das große Abenteuer des Kaspar Schmeck. Hessian
1984	United States	George Washington		CBS	Buzz Kulik	Biography, drama, history, war. George Washington
1987	United Kingdom; Canada	The Devil's Disciple		BBC	David Hugh Jones	Comedy, drama, romance. Based on the 1897 play The Devil's Disciple.
1997	United States	Liberty! The American Revolution		PBS	Ellen Hovde and Muffie Meyer	Documentary, history, American Revolution
2002	United States	Benjamin Franklin		PBS	Ellen Hovde and Muffie Meyer	Documentary, history. Benjamin Franklin
2002-2003	United States	Liberty's Kids		PBS Kids (PBS)	Judy Reilly; Marsha Goodman Einstein	Animation, adventure, family, history, war.
2006	United States	The Revolution		History Channel	Peter Schnall	Documentary, history, American Revolution
2008	United States	John Adams		HBO	Tom Hooper	Biography, drama, history. Based on the 2001 biography John Adams about John Adams
2014-2017	United States	Turn: Washington's Spies		AMC		Drama, history, war. Based on the book Washington's Spies. Culper Ring
2015	United States	Sons of Liberty		History Channel	Kari Skogland	Drama, history.
2015	Canada	The Book of Negroes		CBC	Clement Virgo	Drama, history, war. Based on the 2007 novel The Book of Negroes. Black Loyalist
2022	United States	Benjamin Franklin		PBS	Ken Burns	Documentary, biography, history.
2024	United States	Franklin		Apple TV+	Tim Van Patten	Biography, drama, history. Based on the 2005 book A Great Improvisation: Franklin, France, and the Birth of America.
2025	United States	Thomas Jefferson		History Channel		Biography, history
2025	United States	The American Revolution		PBS	Ken Burns, Sarah Botstein, and David P. Schmidt	Documentary, drama, history

== See also ==
- British Empire in fiction
- Commemoration of the American Revolution
- Founding Fathers of the United States
- Historical drama
- List of television series and miniseries about the American Revolution
- List of plays and musicals about the American Revolution
- List of films about revolution
