= The Revolution (miniseries) =

2006 American miniseries from The History Channel

- Release poster
- Also known as: The American Revolution
- Genre: Documentary
- Written by: Alexander Emmert; Stephen Stept
- Directed by: Peter Schnall; Alexander Emmert
- Narrated by: Edward Herrmann
- Composer: Gary Pozner
- Country of origin: United States
- Original language: English
- No. of episodes: 13

Production
- Executive producers: Peter Schnall; Justine Simonson; Stephen Stept
- Producer: Gregory Henry
- Cinematography: Peter Schnall; David Shadrack Smith
- Editor: Ísold Uggadóttir
- Running time: 60 minutes
- Production company: Partisan Pictures

Original release
- Network: The History Channel
- Release: June 4 – August 27, 2006

The Revolution (also known as The American Revolution) is a 2006 American miniseries from The History Channel composed of thirteen episodes which track the American Revolution from the Boston Massacre through the Treaty of Paris, which declared America's independence from Great Britain. The series is narrated by Edward Herrmann.

== Cast ==
Edward Herrmann, as the Narrator

- Mark Collins as George Washington
- Glenn C. Reimer as John Adams
- Ben Beckley/Jason Audette as Thomas Jefferson
- John H. Bert as Alexander Hamilton
- James Karcher as Gen. Benedict Arnold
- Chris O'Brocto as Gen. Horatio Gates
- Jonah Triebwasser as Gen. Thomas Gage
- Daniel B. Martin as Gen. Nathanael Greene
- Nicholas Barber as Lord North
- Dave Dyshuk as Gen. John Burgoyne

== Episodes ==
"Boston, Bloody Boston."
The controversies and conflicts leading to war, including the Stamp Act, the Boston Massacre, the Boston Tea Party, and the Battles of Lexington and Concord.
"Rebellion to Revolution."
The Revolutionaries lay siege to Boston; the formation of the Continental Army and the conscription of slaves by both sides.
"Declaring Independence."
Dark and devastating struggles challenge the dreams for independence in 1776.
"American Crisis."
General George Washington gambles on a brilliant yet dangerously daring stroke to save his army and America.
"Path to World War."
Benjamin Franklin tries to convince the French to join the fight against Britain; Philadelphia falls to the British; the Americans win a stunning victory at Saratoga and gain a new ally.
"Forging an Army."
Washington struggles to sustain and rebuild his Army at Valley Forge.
"Treason & Betrayal."
General Benedict Arnold is made military governor of Philadelphia and marries Peggy Shippen, but attacks on his character and perceived insults to his honor cause him to betray the revolution.
"The War Heads South."
A new British war plan is conceived, a new British commander-in-chief is selected and the British lay siege to Charleston.
"Hornet's Nest."
War erupts in the Southern Colonies with Americans vs. British and Loyalists vs. Patriots, British general Banastre Tarleton creates a bloody reputation and Washington dispatches General Nathanael Greene to rebuild the American Southern Army.
"The End Game."
The struggle for independence reaches its climax as both sides are tired of the war.
"Becoming a Nation."
King George III is forced by the parliament to sue for peace and Washington disbands the Continental Army.
"Road to the Presidency."
The War is over, but Washington is enlisted for another duty.
"A President and His Revolution."
While Washington is on his way to be inaugurated as the first President of the United States, he looks back at some defining moments in the revolution.

== Home media release and episode status ==
The History Channel and A&E Home Video (distributed by New Video Group) released a four disc DVD set on December 19, 2006, following its series debut on the History Channel.

The miniseries is currently available for streaming online on the History Channel's streaming service, History Vault, as well as Amazon Prime Video, Plex, The Roku Channel and Tubi.

== See also ==
- List of television series and miniseries about the American Revolution
- List of films about the American Revolution
- Founding Fathers of the United States
- The American Revolution - 2025 documentary television miniseries directed by Ken Burns
- Liberty! The American Revolution - 1997 documentary television miniseries
