= Benjamin Franklin (2002 TV series) =

2002 American documentary miniseries

- Written by: Ronald Blumer
- Directed by: Ellen Hovde; Muffie Meyer
- Music by: Richard Einhorn
- Original language: English

Production
- Producers: Ellen Hovde; Muffie Meyer
- Cinematography: James Brown; Robert Elfstrom; Boyd Estus; Tom Hurwitz; Joel Shapiro; Joe Vitagliano
- Editors: Eric Davies; Donna Marino; Sharon Sachs
- Running time: 210 minutes

Original release
- Network: PBS
- Release: November 19 – November 21, 2002

Benjamin Franklin is a 2002 American documentary miniseries about United States Founding Father Benjamin Franklin which premiered November 19–20, 2002, and was re-broadcast August 22–September 5, 2005. The series was produced by Twin Cities Public Television of Minneapolis-St. Paul.

Benjamin Franklin won an Emmy for Outstanding Nonfiction Special (Traditional) in 2003. Executive producers Catherine Allan and Jerry Richman accepted the award.

== Episode 1: Let the Experiment Be Made ==
Franklin's first 47 years, a period that saw the birth of the Enlightenment. He took this intellectual revolution to heart, writing aphorisms based on it for the publication he founded, Poor Richard's Almanack. Franklin made significant contributions to his fellow Philadelphians, contributions which included the ideas of public libraries and a volunteer fire department. Richard Easton plays Franklin; Colm Feore narrates.

== Episode 2: The Making of a Revolutionary ==
In 1757 Franklin moves to London, sent from Pennsylvania on a mission to allow the colony to tax the Penn family's lands. Franklin arrived as an ardent admirer of the empire as well as a lover of the American colonies (“There's nothing I want more than the prosperity of both,” he says). Seventeen years later, he left—a revolutionary.

== Episode 3: The Chess Master ==
The final 14 years of Franklin's life, nine of which were spent in Paris as ambassador to France from the rebellious American colonies. His primary objective was to secure financial and military aid. To this he brought the skills of a chess master, able to think many moves ahead in the game.

== Cast ==
- Richard Easton - Benjamin Franklin
- Matthew Bentley - Benjamin Franklin as a child
- Dylan Baker - Benjamin Franklin as a young man
- Colm Feore - Narrator
- Gerry Bamman - Paul Wentworth
- Blair Brown - Jane Franklin
- Kathleen Chalfant - Silence Dogood
- Anthony Cochrane - George III
- John Curless - William Strahan
- Peter Donaldson - John Adams
- Jennifer Dundas - Catherine Ray
- Peter Gerety - Joseph Galloway
- Daniel Gerrol - Joseph Priestley
- Ronald Guttman - Le Comte de Vergennes
- Anthony Heald - Jonathan Austin
- John Christopher Jones - Ephraim Eliot
- Simon Jones - Thomas Penn
- Eddie Korbich - Jared Ruggles
- Roberta Maxwell - Deborah Read Franklin
- Jefferson Mays - Elkanah Watson
- Martin Rayner - Robert Whittington
- Sebastian Roché - Vicomte
- Natacha Roi - Madame Brillon de Joy
- Andrew Seear - British government official
- Josef Sommer - Cotton Mather
- Jim True-Frost - William Franklin
- Laurent St. Pierre - Count de Segur

== VHS and DVD release ==
Benjamin Franklin is on VHS and DVD.

== See also ==
- List of films about the American Revolution
- List of television series and miniseries about the American Revolution
- Benjamin Franklin, 1974 miniseries
- Benjamin Franklin, 2022 film
- Franklin, 2024 miniseries
