= Commemoration of the American Revolution =

United States Bicentennial logo

Commemoration of the American Revolution typifies the patriotic sentiment surrounding the American Revolution and the desire to preserve and honor the "Spirit of '76". As the founding story of the United States, it is covered in the schools, memorialized by a national holiday, and commemorated in monuments, artwork, and in popular culture. Independence Day (the "Fourth of July") is a major national holiday celebrated annually. Besides local sites such as Bunker Hill, one of the first national pilgrimages for memorial tourists was Mount Vernon, George Washington's estate, which attracted ten thousand visitors a year by the 1850s.

== Memory ==
Every nation constructs and honors the memory of its founding, and following generations use it to establish its identity and define patriotism. The memory of the Founding and the Revolution has long been a matter of national celebration and political symbolism. For example, the right-wing "Tea Party movement" of the 21st century explicitly memorialized the Boston Tea Party as a protest against intrusive government. In the 1850s, editors and orators both North and South claimed their region was the true custodian of the legacy of 1776, as they used the Revolution symbolically in their rhetoric. David Ryan, noting that the Bicentennial was celebrated a year after the United States' humiliating 1975 withdrawal from Vietnam, says the Ford administration stressed the themes of renewal and rebirth based on a restoration of traditional values, and presented a nostalgic approach to 1776 that made it seem eternally young and fresh.

The Revolution has been described as the source of a non-denominational American civil religion that has shaped patriotism, and the memory and meaning of the nation's birth. Specific battles are not central (as they are for the Civil War) but rather some events and people have been celebrated as icons of certain virtues (or vices). For example, some note the American Revolution has its Moses-like leader (George Washington), its "prophets" (Thomas Jefferson, Thomas Paine), "disciples" (Alexander Hamilton, James Madison) and "martyrs" (Boston Massacre, Crispus Attucks, Nathan Hale), as well as its "devils" (Benedict Arnold), "holy sites" (Valley Forge, Bunker Hill), rituals (Boston Tea Party), "holy symbol" (the new flag), "sacred holidays" (Independence Day, Washington's Birthday), and "holy scriptures" which are carefully studied or legally applied (The Declaration of Independence, United States Constitution, and the Bill of Rights).

== Great men ==
There are many monuments or commemorations of the major Founding Fathers, with the names of Washington and Jefferson most often selected for buildings, sculptures, postage, and currency. In the 1920s, Washington and Jefferson, together with Theodore Roosevelt and Abraham Lincoln, were chosen by sculptor Gutzon Borglum and approved by President Calvin Coolidge to be the four American heroes celebrated at the Mount Rushmore National Memorial. Attendance at the remote South Dakota site reached a million visitors a year in 1959, and passed the two million level in 2005.

== Sites and battlefields ==
Today, more than 100 battlefields and historic sites of the American Revolution are protected and maintained by federal, state and local governments. The National Park Service, a federal agency, alone owns and maintains more than 50 battlefield parks and sites related to the Revolution. On Veteran's Day (November 11) in 2014, the Civil War Trust, the Society of the Cincinnati and other preservation groups announced the creation of "Campaign 1776," an initiative to protect and interpret the battlefields of the American Revolution and the War of 1812. As does the Civil War Trust, "Campaign 1776" uses public-private partnerships to provide the funding to acquire battlefield properties. By the end of 2017, "Campaign 1776" had acquired more than 675 battlefield acres at 10 battlefields of the Revolutionary War or War of 1812 in six states. On May 8, 2018, the organization became the American Battlefield Trust comprised two divisions, the Civil War Trust and the Revolutionary War Trust.

== Bicentennial of 1976 ==
The United States Bicentennial was a series of celebrations and observances during the mid-1970s that paid tribute to historical events leading up to the creation of the United States of America as an independent republic. It was a central event in the memory of the American Revolution. The Bicentennial culminated on Sunday, July 4, 1976, with the 200th anniversary of the adoption of the Declaration of Independence.

== Commemorations of the Revolutionary War ==
After the first U.S. postage stamp was issued in 1849 the U.S. Post Office frequently issued commemorative stamps celebrating the various events of the Revolutionary War.

Selected issues

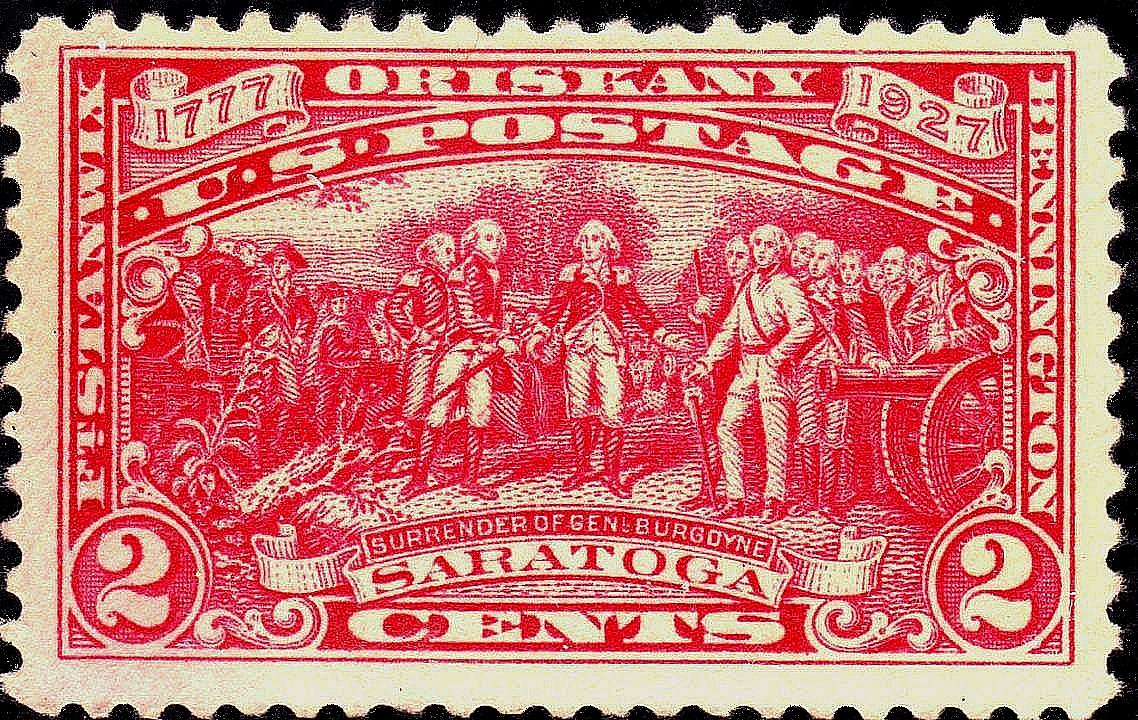
150th anniversary of Saratoga issue of 1927

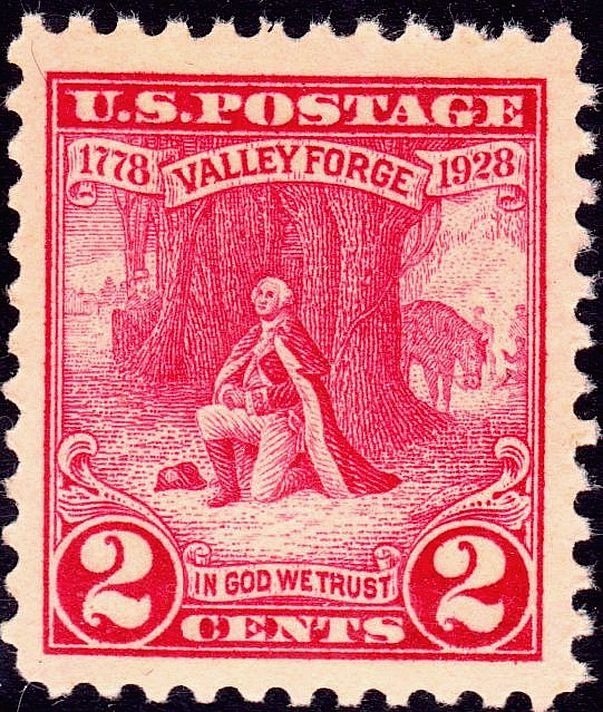
150th anniversary issue of 1928

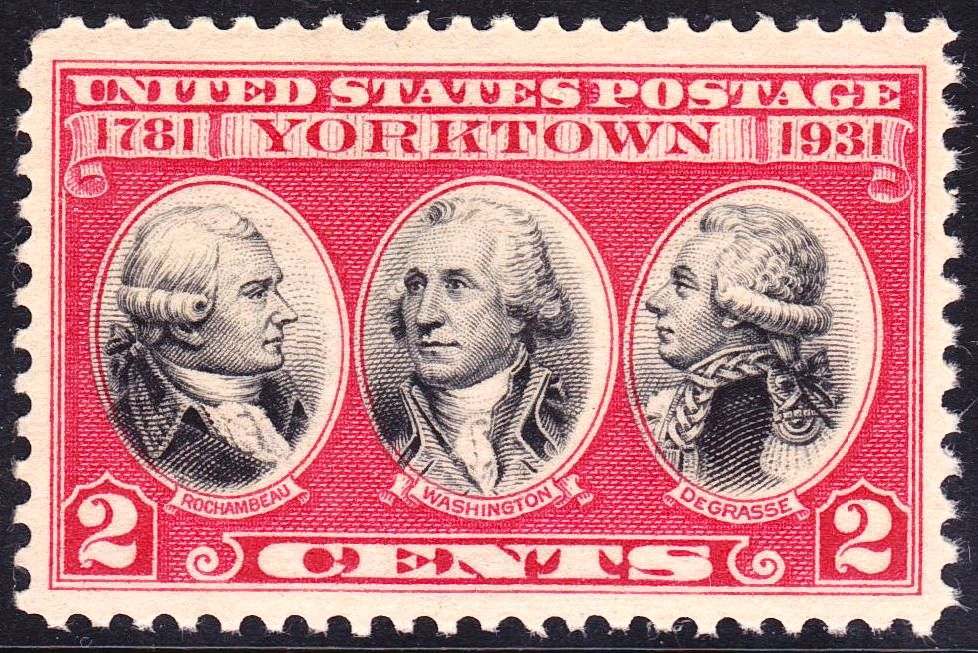
150th anniversary of Yorktown issue of 1931

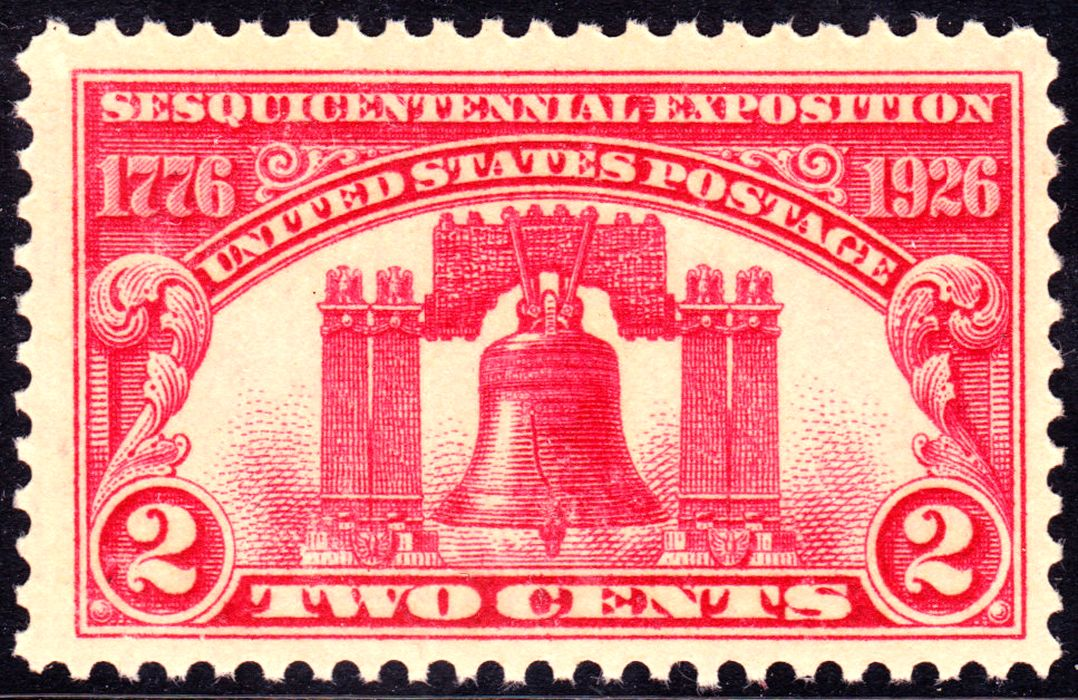
150th anniversary issue of 1926

== Fiction, film, popular culture ==
The American Revolution has been featured in many forms of popular culture.

Nancy Rhoden, a Canadian specialist on the Revolutionary era has evaluated the evidence, accuracy, and the historical themes employed by twelve Hollywood films featuring the American Revolution from 1939 to 2002. In covering the major characters, heroes and villains, Patriots and Loyalists, plots, and social and class themes, she compares cinematic understandings of the Revolution with the interpretations of historians to reveal thematic consistencies, variations, and conceptual gulfs between filmmakers and historians.

== Organizations ==
- Society of the Cincinnati, A hereditary society founded in 1783, and composed of men who are male-line descendants of officers of the Continental Army or Navy who served in the Revolutionary War.
- Sons of the Revolution, a hereditary society founded in 1876, and composed of men who are direct descendants of persons who served as a military, naval, or marine officer, soldier, sailor or marine, or as a member of the Continental Congress or who assisted in the establishment of American independence in various other ways.
- Sons of the American Revolution, a congressionally chartered organization founded in 1889; its members are men who are direct descendants of persons who served in the Revolutionary War or who contributed to establishing the independence of the United States.
- Daughters of the American Revolution, a congressionally chartered organization founded in 1890; its members are female descendants of soldiers or others of the Revolutionary period who aided the cause of American independence.
- Daughters of the Cincinnati, a hereditary organization founded in 1894, and composed of women who are direct descendants of officers of the Continental Army or Navy who served in the Revolutionary War.
- Children of the American Revolution, a congressionally chartered organization founded 1895 (now the nation's oldest and largest patriotic youth organization); membership is open to anyone under the age of 22 who is a direct descendant of someone who served in the Continental Army or gave material aid to the cause of freedom in the American Revolution.

== See also ==
- Legacy of George Washington
- Benjamin Franklin in popular culture
- Cultural depictions of Thomas Jefferson
- Washington's Birthday
- Jefferson's Birthday
- Pulaski Day
- Von Steuben Day
- Minor American Revolution holidays
