= Chris Weatherhead =

American dramatist

- Born: Christine Anne Weatherhead; Los Angeles County, California, U.S.
- Occupations: Actress; writer; director; producer
- Years active: 1971–present
- Spouse(s): Clarence Felder, 1987–present Richard Council, 1971–1982 (divorced)
- Children: 1

Christine Anne Weatherhead is an American film, theater and television actress, writer, director, and producer.

== Early life ==
Born in Los Angeles County, California, to airline pilot Lee Weatherhead and former actress Gwenn Steelman, Weatherhead suffered early on from stuttering and other speech impediments but, thanks to therapy pursued by her mother, was by age eight singing and dancing in assorted country clubs in and around Los Angeles. She later trained with Brewster Mason of the Royal Shakespeare Company at UC Irvine and in London, and at the American Conservatory Theater in San Francisco. She has also trained in New York with Michael Shurtleff and Warren Robertson, with the Royal Shakespeare Company in London, and with the American Rep Theatre (NYC).

== Career ==
Weatherhead directed, produced and co-wrote the docudrama, "John Laurens' War" a made-for-TV film about a lost hero of the American Revolution. She also co-starred, co-wrote and directed a feature film, All For Liberty, which has won nine international film awards, three National Historical Awards [SAR & DAR], and received rave reviews. She co-starred for two years in James Lapine's smash Off-Broadway hit, Table Settings, receiving rave reviews from major New York and U.S. media. She starred in the feature film Whatever It Takes and guest starred in numerous primetime TV series, such as Dallas, Equal Justice, NBC-TV's Night Court, Our Family Honor, and the ABC series Moonlighting.

On daytime television, Weatherhead starred for two years on the ABC soap The Edge of Night as the evil Alicia Van Dine. She also has played recurring roles in four other daytime series.

=== Theatrical and film work ===
She is also a co-founder of the Actors' Theatre of South Carolina, a professional theatre and film company in 1995 with husband, Clarence Felder, directing and/or producing 103 productions over 20 years, while performing many roles, including, Mary Shelley in Clarence Felder's play, Mary Shelley & The Creature of Fire, Mary Chesnut in Mary Chesnut’s War For Independence, and the portrayal of Mary Chesnut for C-SPAN's American Writers series. Ms. Weatherhead portrayed American Revolutionary heroine, Rebecca Brewton Motte in her one-woman production, "Rebecca & The Fox" at the International Piccolo Spoleto Festival in Charleston, SC. She also adapted for the stage,"Frederick Douglass...No Turning Back", which premiered at the festival in 2017, touring with star, Kyle Taylor. ATSC has garnered nine international film awards for "All For Liberty", directed by Weatherhead and co-written by Weatherhead and Ronald Mangravite, which was also named one of Top Ten Revolutionary War movies by the Journal of the American Revolution. "John Laurens War," a docudrama made for TV, was awarded major grant by the South Carolina Humanities Council, and six international film awards, including five from Accolade Global Film Competition and a REMI award for Cultural Feature from the 50th Worldfest Houston Film Festival in Houston, Texas.

=== Literary works ===
As a writer, Weatherhead has written six one-act plays, four screenplays and is the author of an historical novel, Against the Wind, The Rise of Kamehameha The Great (amazon.com), a historical novel set in 18th century Hawaii.

== Personal life ==
Chris married her husband, nationally known American character actor, director, playwright, poet Clarence Felder, on August 3, 1985; they have one child, a daughter, Helen Felder Huggins. She was previously married to actor Richard Council from June 2, 1971, to July 15, 1982. She attended Newport Harbor High School. After 14 years in New York theater, she and husband Clarence Felder moved to LA where they continued to act in film, TV and theater. She is the daughter of Lee Dewolf Weatherhead and Gwendolyn Steelman. She has two elder sisters, Janine and Penny. Chris spent seven years writing and producing video and articles to promote Match-Two Prisoner Outreach, a very successful program throughout California.
