= List of television series and miniseries about the American Revolution =

This is a list of television series and miniseries about the American Revolution.

- The Swamp Fox – 1959–1960 ABC-TV miniseries starring Leslie Nielsen as General Francis Marion
- The Young Rebels – 1970–1971 television series starring Richard Ely and Louis Gossett Jr.
- Benjamin Franklin – 1974 four-part miniseries
- Bicentennial Minutes – 1974–1976 series of 912 episodes to commemorate the United States Bicentennial
- The Bastard – 1978 TV miniseries based on the 1974 novel by John Jakes, starring Andrew Stevens
- The Rebels – 1979 TV miniseries based on the 1975 novel by John Jakes, starring Andrew Stevens and Don Johnson
- George Washington – 1984 TV miniseries starring Barry Bostwick
- George Washington II: The Forging of a Nation – 1986 TV miniseries starring Barry Bostwick
- The American Revolution – 1994 A&E miniseries starring Kelsey Grammer and Charles Durning
- The Revolutionary War – 1995 TV miniseries narrated by journalist Charles Kuralt
- Thomas Jefferson – 1997 three-part television documentary by Ken Burns
- Liberty! The American Revolution – 1997 six-episode PBS documentary miniseries
- Benjamin Franklin – 2002 TV series about Founding Father Benjamin Franklin
- Liberty's Kids – 40-part animated television series produced by DiC Entertainment and originally broadcast on PBS Kids from September 2002 to April 2003, since syndicated and seen in repeats on Kids' WB and elsewhere.
- The Revolution – 2006 13-part miniseries broadcast on History Channel covering the American Revolution from the Townshend Acts of 1767 to George Washington's inauguration in 1789.
- John Adams – 2008 HBO miniseries biopic about John Adams, based on David McCullough's biography also entitled John Adams.
- Sleepy Hollow – 2013–2017 American television series that aired on Fox
- Turn: Washington's Spies – 2014–2017 American television series that aired on AMC
- The American Revolution – 2014 three-part miniseries that aired on American Heroes Channel
- Sons of Liberty – 2015 miniseries focusing of Samuel Adams, John Hancock, and others.
- Washington – 2020 three-part miniseries about the life of George Washington.
- Benjamin Franklin – 2022 two-part American documentary by Ken Burns that first aired on PBS.
- Franklin – 2024 eight-part miniseries about Benjamin Franklin
- Thomas Jefferson – 2025 six-part miniseries about Thomas Jefferson
- The American Revolution - 2025 six-part miniseries by Ken Burns, Sarah Botstein, and David P. Schmidt

== See also ==
- Founding Fathers of the United States
- Commemoration of the American Revolution
- List of films about the American Revolution
- List of plays and musicals about the American Revolution
