= Charles Wycliffe =

- First appearance: Wycliffe and the Three-Toed Pussy (1968)
- Last appearance: Wycliffe and the Guild of Nine (2000)
- Created by: W. J. Burley
- Portrayed by: Jack Shepherd

In-universe information
- Gender: Male
- Title: Superintendent
- Occupation: Police Detective
- Spouse: Helen
- Children: 2
- Nationality: British

Charles Wycliffe is a fictional English detective superintendent, created by author W. J. Burley. He featured in twenty-two novels. (Burley died when the twenty-third was still unfinished.)

== Fictional biography ==
D/Supt Wycliffe is the head of the CID (plainclothes detective branch of the police) in Devon and Cornwall. As such, he takes charge of all investigations of serious crime. Although Wycliffe is not a native Cornishman (his family were market gardeners in Shropshire) and he is advised that the outlook and attitudes of people in some of Cornwall's more remote communities is not what he may be used to, he tries hard to sympathise with the victims and sometimes even the perpetrators of crime and their families.

Wycliffe is happily married to Helen, a former typist. They have two children, and live in a large old house which overlooks the River Tamar estuary. The strains of Wycliffe's job, which means he has to spend long periods away from home investigating cases in the most distant parts of the county, sometimes take their toll on his family life. He has a fondness for literature and antique books. Wycliffe is described as being a slight man, only just over the regulation minimum height for police constables. He keeps fit by taking long walks along beaches and coastal paths.

== Other characters ==
Several of Wycliffe's subordinates and colleagues are recurring characters. In many of the early cases, especially those in or near Plymouth, Detective Inspector Gill is featured. By comparison with Wycliffe's approach, he unsympathetically bullies suspects and witnesses. In later cases, Wycliffe relies more on the unpretentious Detective Sergeant (later Detective Inspector) Doug Kersey, and Detective Sergeant (also, later Detective Inspector) Lucy Lane, who manages to look like a fashion model even in the most cramped and squalid settings. Wycliffe tolerates rather than welcomes visits from his immediate superior, the bonhomous Deputy Chief Constable Bellings. The chief pathologist, Dr Franks, usually appears, but he and Wycliffe appear to have little in common.

== Television version ==
In 1994, ITV filmed several of the novels as Wycliffe, over five seasons for a total of thirty-six episodes. In the series, Wycliffe was portrayed by actor Jack Shepherd. DI Doug Kersey was played by Jimmy Yuill and Helen Masters played DI Lucy Lane.

There were some differences between the TV character and the original. For example, in the books, Wycliffe's children have grown up and are living away from home; in the TV series, both are still teenagers. The TV Wycliffe was an accomplished jazz pianist (as Jack Shepherd is in real life).

== List of Wycliffe novels ==
- Wycliffe and the Three-Toed Pussy (1968)
- Wycliffe and How to Kill a Cat (1970)
- Wycliffe and the Guilt Edged Alibi (1971)
- Wycliffe and Death in a Salubrious Place (1973)
- Wycliffe and Death in Stanley Street (1975)
- Wycliffe and the Pea-Green Boat (1975)
- Wycliffe and the School Bullies (1976)
- Wycliffe and the Scapegoat (1978)
- Wycliffe in Paul's Court (1980)
- Wycliffe's Wild Goose Chase (1982)
- Wycliffe and the Beales (1983)
- Wycliffe and the Four Jacks (1985)
- Wycliffe and the Quiet Virgin (1986)
- Wycliffe and the Winsor Blue (1987)
- Wycliffe and the Tangled Web (1988)
- Wycliffe and the Cycle of Death (1990)
- Wycliffe and the Dead Flautist (1991)
- Wycliffe and the Last Rites (1992)
- Wycliffe and the Dunes Mystery (1994)
- Wycliffe and the House of Fear (1995)
- Wycliffe and the Redhead (1997)
- Wycliffe and the Guild of Nine (2000)
- Wycliffe and the Last Lap (2003) unfinished

== See also ==
- Wycliffe series
