= Wycliffe (TV series) =

British television detective series (1993–1998)

- DVD cover
- Starring: Jack Shepherd; Jimmy Yuill; Helen Masters
- Composers: Mark Thomas (1993); Nigel Hess (1994–1998)
- Country of origin: United Kingdom
- Original language: English
- No. of series: 5
- No. of episodes: 38

Production
- Executive producers: Alan Clayton (1993); Stephen Matthews (1994–1997); Jenny Reeks (1994); Michelle Buck (1997–1998)
- Producers: Pennant Roberts (1993); Geraint Morris (1994–1995); Michael Bartley (1996–1998)
- Running time: 50 minutes (Specials 90 minutes)
- Production company: HTV

Original release
- Network: ITV
- Release: 7 August 1993 – 5 July 1998

Wycliffe is a British television series based on W. J. Burley's novels about Detective Superintendent Charles Wycliffe. It was produced by HTV and broadcast on the ITV Network, after a pilot episode on 7 August 1993, between 24 July 1994 and 5 July 1998. The series was filmed in Cornwall, with a production office in Truro. Music for the series was composed by Nigel Hess, who was nominated for the Royal Television Society award for the best original television theme in 1997. Charles Wycliffe, played by Jack Shepherd, is assisted by DI Doug Kersey (Jimmy Yuill) and DI Lucy Lane (Helen Masters).

Each episode deals with a murder investigation. In the early series, stories were adapted from Burley's books and were in classic whodunit style, often with quirky characters and plot elements. In later seasons, the tone became more naturalistic, and there was more emphasis on internal politics within the police force.

== Setting and characters ==
The setting in Cornwall is an important feature of the series, providing both picturesque landscapes and glimpses into the local way of life. Some characters work in the tourist industry. Some of the problems of the county, such as the struggling fishing industry, long-term unemployment, and prejudice against new age travellers, are shown in various episodes. Wycliffe and his team are responsible for a large geographical area and often have to spend time away from home during an investigation. This can cause problems for Wycliffe, who is shown as a contented family man married to a teacher (Lynn Farleigh) and with two teenage children. It also makes it difficult for Lane and Kersey, who are both single, to form relationships outside work.

Wycliffe's beat appears to cover mainly central and west Cornwall. There are frequent references to certain major towns, including Truro, Newquay, Camborne and Penzance (these places were also used as filming locations). Other towns in the same area, such as Falmouth, St Austell or St Ives, figure less frequently; the only episode for which a fictional Cornish town ("Carrick") was invented, complete with a red-light district, called Eastgate. Bodmin (actually mainly Bodmin Moor) features strongly in one episode, "Number of the Beast", which is about the so-called Beast of Bodmin (said to be a big cat). In the final episode, "Land's End", Wycliffe refers to Wadebridge, near Bodmin, as being on "the other side of the county".

Devon and Cornwall Police is no longer organised into divisions. The Major Crime Investigation Team in Cornwall, which would presumably be headed by Wycliffe, was actually based at Newquay during the period in which the series was made, but Wycliffe's divisional headquarters appears to be in the Camborne area.

== Cast ==
- Jack Shepherd as Detective Superintendent Charles Wycliffe
- Jimmy Yuill as DI Doug Kersey (played by Kevin Quarmby in the pilot)
- Helen Masters as DI Lucy Lane (played by Carla Mendonça in the pilot)
- Lynn Farleigh as Helen Wycliffe (played by Lucy Fleming in the pilot)
- Tim Wylton as Dr. Franks (played by Peter Settelen in the pilot)
- Aaron Harris as DS Dixon (Series 1–3)
- Adam Barker as DC Potter (Series 1–3)
- Michael Attwell as Deputy Chief Constable Stevens (series 4–5)

== Episodes ==
=== Series overview ===
Series	Episodes	Originally released	
Series	Episodes	First released	Last released
Pilot		7 August 1993	
1	6	24 July 1994	28 August 1994
2	8	18 June 1995	6 August 1995
3	8	9 June 1996	11 August 1996
4	8	29 June 1997	17 August 1997
Special		27 December 1997	
5	6	17 May 1998	5 July 1998

=== Pilot (1993) ===
Title	Directed by	Written by	Original release date
"Wycliffe and the Cycle of Death"	Pennant Roberts	Julia Jones	7 August 1993
A bookshop owner in Penzance is brutally murdered, and Wycliffe discovers all is not well among the members of one of the area's most respected families. –Starring Carla Mendonca as Sgt Lane, Kevin Quarmby as DI Kersey and Lucy Fleming as Helen Wycliffe. –Based on the novel by W. J. Burley, Wycliffe and the Cycle of Death.

=== Series 1 (1994) ===
No. overall	No. in series	Title	Directed by	Written by	Original release date
1	1	"The Four Jacks"	Ferdinand Fairfax	Edward Canfor-Dumas	24 July 1994
A young female archaeology student is found naked in bed with gunshot wounds, and lies in a critical condition in hospital. As surgeons try to save her life, Wycliffe digs into the life of a famous novelist (played by Bill Nighy), who claims his life is at risk. Then, a man is shot dead while walking his dog on the beach, and Wycliffe is under pressure to act quickly if he is to prevent another murder. –Based on the novel by W. J. Burley, Wycliffe and the Four Jacks.
2	2	"The Dead Flautist"	Martyn Friend	Steve Trafford	31 July 1994
When the body of an amateur flautist, Tony Miller, is found shot by his own gun on the secluded estate of Lord and Lady Bottrell, it is assumed that he killed himself. But Wycliffe senses there is more to the case than first meets the eye. As he unravels the dead man's last days, another mystery is revealed—the disappearance of a maid from the Bottrell household. Family feuds and illicit relationships are uncovered, and then another body is found. –Based on the novel by W. J. Burley, Wycliffe and the Dead Flautist.
3	3	"The Scapegoat"	Martyn Friend	Russell Lewis	7 August 1994
A Cornish undertaker's mysterious disappearance is linked to a disturbing summer ritual. Local gossip intensifies when the man's body is found, washed up on the rocks and begins a murder inquiry which ends with an effigy strapped to a burning wheel plunging off the cliffs. –Based on the novel by W. J. Burley, Wycliffe and the Scapegoat.
4	4	"The Tangled Web"	Ferdinand Fairfax	Andrew Holden	14 August 1994
Wycliffe is brought in when an elderly bedridden woman is found dead, her body locked in a freezer, and a pregnant teenager, Hilda Clemo, from a bizarre family, vanishes from her Cornish village. As fears for her safety grow, Wycliffe questions the family, whose feuding uncovers some dark secrets. Wycliffe has to unpick the tangled web of intrigue and greed. –Based on the novel by W. J. Burley, Wycliffe and the Tangled Web.
5	5	"The Last Rites"	A. J. Quinn	Rob Heyland	21 August 1994
When the Rev. Jordan arrives at the village church, he discovers the partially clothed body of Jessica Dobell, the church cleaner, spreadeagled below the cross. A satanic cult is thought to be behind the gruesome death, but Wycliffe believes responsibility lies elsewhere. There is an air of violent hatred in the village, not all of it directed towards the dead woman. –Based on the novel by W. J. Burley, Wycliffe and the Last Rites.
6	6	"The Pea Green Boat"	A. J. Quinn	Steve Trafford	28 August 1994
When Harry Tremaine is killed in the explosion of his fishing boat, suspicion falls on the man's son, who stands to inherit everything, but Wycliffe remains unconvinced. There's also a local developer who wants to build a marina on the quayside Tremaine owned; Tremaine's partner has been having an affair with his wife; and there is a mysterious recipient of £500 in cash from Tremaine on the first day of every month. –Based on the novel by W. J. Burley, Wycliffe and the Pea-Green Boat.

=== Series 2 (1995) ===
No. overall	No. in series	Title	Directed by	Written by	Original release date
7	1	"All for Love"	Martyn Friend	Steve Trafford	18 June 1995
A hunt for John Bonetti, an escaped prisoner from HMP Bodmin, takes a dramatic twist after the discovery of a body. Wycliffe and his team race against time to recapture him.
8	2	"The Trojan Horse"	Patrick Lau	Steve Trafford	25 June 1995
Alex Keir is distraught when his wife Alison goes missing, but Wycliffe is sceptical of his grief, until a ransom note is found. The case of apparent kidnapping then takes a dramatic turn when Mrs Keir is found dead and smelling of alcohol at the wheel of a crashed car.
9	3	"Charades"	Martyn Friend	Jonathan Rich	2 July 1995
Wycliffe and his team investigate the death of a man found blasted by a shotgun at a Cornish holiday home. They discover evidence of ill-feeling between the dead man and his brother-in-law.
10	4	"Lost Contact"	Patrick Lau	Isabelle Grey	9 July 1995
When a man's virtually unidentifiable body is washed ashore, Wycliffe is baffled when two different women claim it is her missing husband.
11	5	"Four and Twenty Blackbirds"	Steve Goldie	Julian Jones	16 July 1995
When a farmer goes missing, leaving his sheep and house unattended, the local police call in Wycliffe. Discoveries of arson and bloodstains lead the team into a farming community struggling to survive.
12	6	"Happy Families"	Steve Goldie	Sian Orrells	23 July 1995
When a schoolgirl is found dead in a science laboratory after a school disco, Wycliffe tries to discover through her family and friends whether it was suicide or murder.
13	7	"Wild Oats"	Michael Owen Morris	Patrick Harkins	30 July 1995
When an attempt is made to steal a headless skeleton from an archaeological dig, Wycliffe discovers an estate steeped in archaic values. The identification of the skeleton unsettles the land-owning Rawle family, whose days of sovereignty in the community are fading.
14	8	"Breaking Point"	Michael Owen Morris	Steve Trafford	6 August 1995
Surfer Anne Carter is found in a deep coma when she is washed ashore. The assumption that she was the victim of a freak accident has to be revised when Wycliffe and his team investigate, and uncover a host of sinister facts and conspiracies. Their task is hindered by an obvious leak to the press, which puts DI Lane in a precarious position.

=== Series 3 (1996) ===
No. overall	No. in series	Title	Directed by	Written by	Original release date
15	1	"Dead on Arrival"	Michael Owen Morris	Steve Trafford	9 June 1996
An abandoned lorry with five corpses at the ferry terminal and a man on the run bring Wycliffe's silver wedding anniversary celebration, which their children have laid on as a surprise, to an abrupt halt.
16	2	"Number of the Beast"	Michael Owen Morris	Jonathan Rich	16 June 1996
When unexplained killings rock the Bodmin community, locals become convinced that the "beast" is back.
17	3	"Slave of Duty"	David Innes Edwards	Jonathan Rich	7 July 1996
A dead man found buried under a pile of 100-year-old wood provides an intriguing case.
18	4	"Total Loss"	David Innes Edwards	Isabelle Grey	14 July 1996
When a fishing boat goes down taking one of the crew with it, Kersey and Lane discover a fishing community that is struggling to survive under the strain of legislation, as well as a new competitive edge to their working relationship.
19	5	"Crazy for You"	Martyn Friend	Tom Needham	21 July 1996
A psychiatrist's wife is murdered in a seemingly unprovoked attack. Wycliffe finds that proving a motive can be harder than catching a killer.
20	6	"Faith"	Martyn Friend	Sian Orrells	28 July 1996
The discovery of a baby's body leads the team to a bizarre pagan sect.
21	7	"Last Judgement"	John Glenister	Carolyn Sally Jones	4 August 1996
When a magistrate known to Wycliffe is found hanged, everything points to suicide but Wycliffe's instincts tell him otherwise.
22	8	"Old Habits"	John Glenister	Scott Cherry	11 August 1996
When a young woman is found strangled, a pathologist is struck by the similarities to a string of other unsolved murders. Wycliffe and his team have to unearth 11-year old evidence to see if they can trace a link.

=== Series 4 (1997) ===
No. overall	No. in series	Title	Directed by	Written by	Original release date
23	1	"Strangers Home"	Alan Wareing	Peter J Hammond	29 June 1997
Tragic events unfold after a wedding with a bizarre guest list: the bride and groom, who have known each other only three weeks, advertised for guests to attend the ceremony in Penzance. Next day, one of the couple is found stabbed to death in their luxurious honeymoon hotel.
24	2	"Close to Home"	David Innes Edwards	Isabelle Grey	6 July 1997
A man is stabbed to death in a pub car park by a stranger, a petty criminal not known to be violent. As Wycliffe investigates, the victim turns out not to be the upstanding businessman he seemed to be.
25	3	"On Account"	David Innes Edwards	Kevin Clarke	13 July 1997
Wycliffe and Kersey exchange strong words as they investigate a disturbing case involving the contamination of jars of baby food in a local supermarket by a blackmailer. Meanwhile, the disciplinary enquiry into Wycliffe's team continues to run its course.
26	4	"Lone Voyager"	Michael Bayshaw	Philip O'Shea	20 July 1997
Wycliffe probes the disappearance of a lone yachtswoman, whose boat is discovered scuttled on the seabed.
27	5	"Seen a Ghost"	Michael Bayshaw	Isabelle Grey	27 July 1997
A dark family secret comes to light when a girl deliberately runs over a woman on a pedestrian crossing. The results of the enquiry board are revealed.
28	6	"Bad Blood"	Alan Wareing	Scott Cherry	3 August 1997
A couple facing eviction from their tied cottage are suspected of murder when the landowner is suddenly killed. Wycliffe must act quickly to identify the killer before locals take the law into their own hands.
29	7	"To Sup with the Devil"	Graeme Harper	Carolyn Sally Jones	10 August 1997
When a local pub landlord is bludgeoned to death, Wycliffe can find few people with a good word to say about him. A police informant points the finger at the victim's former wife and her new husband, but when DI Lane badly mishandles the situation, Wycliffe and Kersey are forced to stage a dramatic rescue.
30	8	"Old Crimes, New Times"	Graeme Harper	Arthur McKenzie	17 August 1997
Pursued by the press, under the spotlight of an internal investigation and lacking support from his superiors, Wycliffe's problems multiply when an old case resurfaces, and DCC Stevens seems out to prove Wycliffe is no longer up to the job.

=== Special (1997) ===
Title	Directed by	Written by	Original release date
"Dance of the Scorpions"	Paul Harrison	Arthur McKenzie	27 December 1997
Wycliffe clashes with his superiors over the way he is handling a gruesome double murder case, after a building society manager and his wife are gunned down.

=== Series 5 (1998) ===
The fifth and final series saw Jack Shepherd directing two episodes: "On Offer", and "Standing Stone". During the filming of this series, Jimmy Yuill fell ill with meningitis. While he was in hospital, the production company, HTV, terminated his contract. Though he made a full recovery, HTV then refused to allow him to return to the programme, apparently for insurance reasons. This caused considerable ill-feeling, and Jack Shepherd made it clear that he did not wish to continue as Wycliffe. ITV did not recommission the programme.

No. overall	No. in series	Title	Directed by	Written by	Original release date
31	1	"On Offer"	Jack Shepherd	Arthur McKenzie	17 May 1998
In a police nursing home, Wycliffe ponders the future after the attempt on his life. Meanwhile, Kersey investigates a salmon poacher's suspicious death. Acting DCI Lane is tempted to move on and up.
32	2	"Time Out"	Alan Wareing	Peter J Hammond	24 May 1998
A prostitute sparks a murder hunt when she tells Kersey that one of her clients confessed to killing another prostitute – but how believable is she?
33	3	"Standing Stone"	Jack Shepherd	Carolyn Sally Jones	31 May 1998
The wife of one of Kersey's friends goes missing after an evening class and later her tutor is found murdered. Kersey's relationship with Lane threatens to lead him into deep waters.
34	4	"Feeding the Rat"	Alan Wareing	Isabelle Grey	7 June 1998
Wycliffe is recovered and back at work. A local climber is killed in a cliff fall, and an unreliable informant claims he was pushed. A re-enactment of the fatal climb only adds to the suspicions.
35	5	"Scope"	Alan Wareing	John Milne	21 June 1998
Wycliffe is awarded the Queen's Gallantry Medal. He then investigates the murder of a policeman whose wife had been having an affair with another officer.
36	6	"Land's End"	Alan Wareing	Kevin Clarke	5 July 1998
Lane investigates two drug dealers' deaths and defends Wycliffe against corruption allegations, after a woman from his past suddenly appears demanding help.

== Home media ==
All five series were released individually on DVD in the UK by Network between 27 July 2009 and 21 February 2011.

All five series were released individually on DVD in Australia through Time Life, distributed by Shock Entertainment. The Complete Collection DVD, containing five individual seasons in a slip box, was released first, followed later in the same year by a new collection slimmed down to a single case with new artwork. In 2014, ITV released The Complete Collection in a single case.
