= Wycliffe and the Winsor Blue =

1987 novel by W. J. Burley

- First edition
- Author: W. J. Burley
- Language: English
- Series: Wycliffe
- Genre: Crime novel
- Publisher: Victor Gollancz Ltd.
- Publication date: 1987
- Pages: 181
- ISBN: 0-385-24311-1
- OCLC: 15489760
- Dewey Decimal: 823.914
- Preceded by: Wycliffe and the Quiet Virgin
- Followed by: Wycliffe and the Tangled Web

Wycliffe and the Winsor Blue (1987) is a crime novel by Cornish writer W. J. Burley.

== Synopsis ==
Following the death of artist Edwin Garland from a heart attack, his family and friends gather for the funeral, and are duly shocked by the apparently motiveless shooting of the dead man's son. When Wycliffe yields no clues after the reading of the old man's mischievously contrived will, the only leads he's left with are the mysterious artist's pigment known as Winsor Blue, and the death of Gifford Tate, a fellow painter and friend of Edwin's, several years before...
