= A New World: A Life of Thomas Paine =

Biographical film (2009)

A New World: A Life of Thomas Paine is a 2009 biographical play by the English playwright Trevor Griffiths on the life of Thomas Paine. Other characters in it include Benjamin Franklin (who appears both as the historical figure and as a narrator), George Washington, Edmund Burke, John Adams and Georges Danton. Its first half tells of Paine's involvement in the American Revolution and its second half of his involvement in the French Revolution, ending with his funeral.

The play began life as a two-part screenplay for Richard Attenborough; though never filmed, it was published in 2005 as 'These Are The Times': A life of Thomas Paine'. It was later adapted for the stage and premiered in the latter format on 29 August 2009 at Shakespeare's Globe. It ran there until 9 October 2009, directed by Dominic Dromgoole and starring John Light in the title role. It continues a run of new plays at the Globe on the broad theme of revolution, following Eric Schlosser's We The People and Jack Shepherd's Holding Fire! in 2007, and Glyn Maxwell's Liberty in 2008.

== See also ==
- List of plays and musicals about the American Revolution
