= A New World =

A New World may refer to:

- "A New World" (Angel), an episode of Angel.
- A New World (EP), by Ronnie Drew.
- Symphony No. 9 - From the New World, a symphony by Dvorak.
- A New World, a novel by Amit Chaudhuri.
- A New World: A Life of Thomas Paine, a play by Trevor Griffiths.
- A New World, an EP by electro house producer Mord Fustang
- "A New World" (The Flash), the series finale of The Flash.
- The motto of the 2016 Summer Olympics in Río de Janeiro.
- "A new world", the 37th and final episode of the Death Note Show.
