= In Lambeth =

In Lambeth may refer to:

- In Lambeth (album), a 2014 album composed by John Zorn and performed by Bill Frisell, Carol Emanuel and Kenny Wollesen
- In Lambeth (play), a 1989 play by Jack Shepherd
