= Holywell, Cornwall =

Village in Cornwall, England

Coordinates: 50°23′N 5°8′W

Holywell
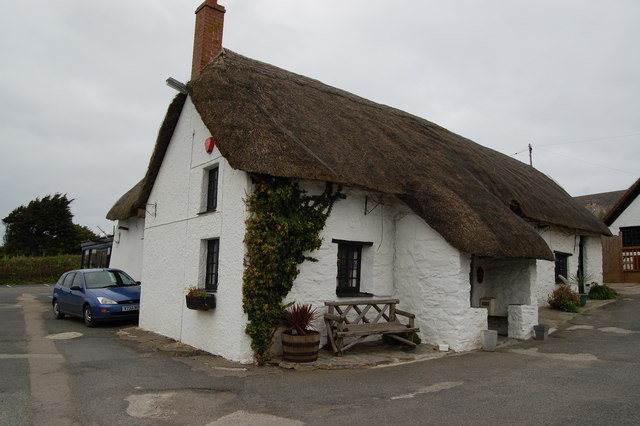
- The Treguth Inn

- Location within Cornwall
- Civil parish: Cubert
- Unitary authority: Cornwall
- Ceremonial county: Cornwall
- Region: South West
- Country: England
- Sovereign state: United Kingdom
- Post town: Newquay
- Postcode district: TR

Holywell (Cornish: Tregew) is a coastal village in the civil parish of Cubert, in north Cornwall, England, United Kingdom. It is at Holywell Bay (Cornish: Porth Heylyn), about three miles (5 km) west-southwest of Newquay.

== Description ==
Holywell beach adjoins the settlement to the northwest and Penhale Camp, formerly an army training establishment that was regularly used by cadets, is half-a-mile to the southwest. On the north side of Holywell beach Holywell Cave was accessible at low tide until a cliff collapse in August 2026, containing many pools formed by natural buildup of minerals. In the cave is St Cubert's holy well. The holy well, or spring located in the cave emerges near a cleft in the rock. Folklore about the area asserts that children who were "passed through this cleft" would be cured of rickets, similar to the cure for rickets associated with the Men-an-Tol stone also located in Cornwall near Penzance.

On the east of the beach, there is a 5,000 year old sand dune system that is one of the largest in Britain. During the summer, tourists can use these dunes for sandboarding.

There are three holiday parks at Holywell. The Meadow Holiday Park ran by a local Cornish family, Holywell Bay Holiday Park, operated by Parkdean Resorts, and Trevornick campsite.

== Notable people ==
W. J. Burley, the author of the Wycliffe novels, lived in Holywell until his death in 2002.

Holywell Bay is also the residence of both Maia Garner and Louis Garner, athletes that have represented Great Britain in the sport of surf lifesaving.

== Film location ==
The "skeet surfing" scene in the 1984 comedy Top Secret! was filmed on Holywell Bay, which stood in for California.

The opening scene for Die Another Day attempting to replicate North Korea, was filmed here in 2002.

Many of the scenes in Poldark were filmed on the beach.

Scenes from the 2015 BBC Miniseries Agatha Christie's And Then There Were None were filmed at Holywell.

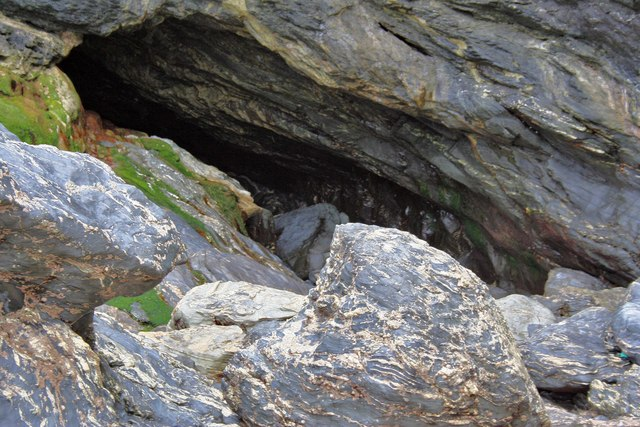
St. Cubert's Holy Well Cave

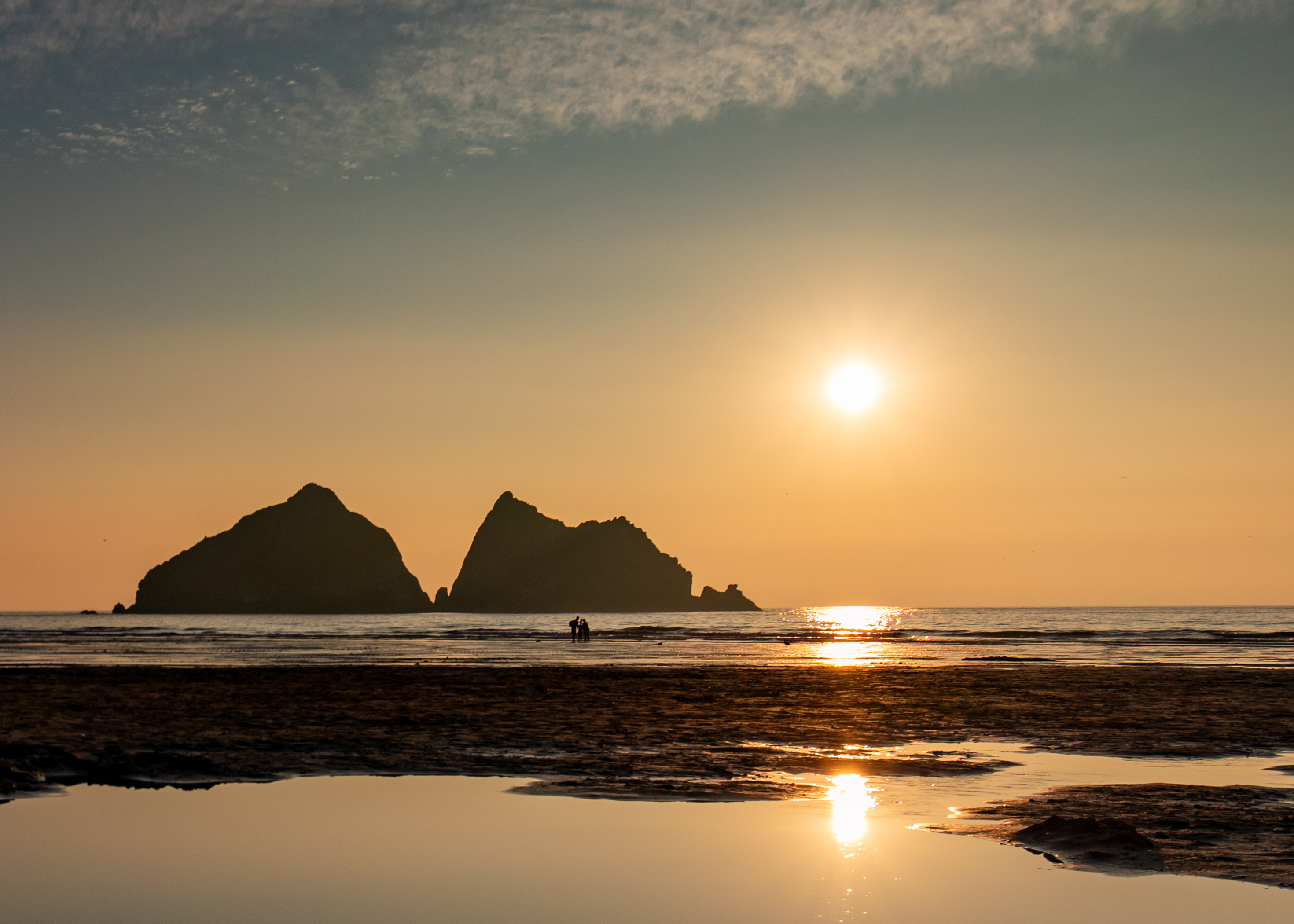
Gull Rocks, Holywell Bay

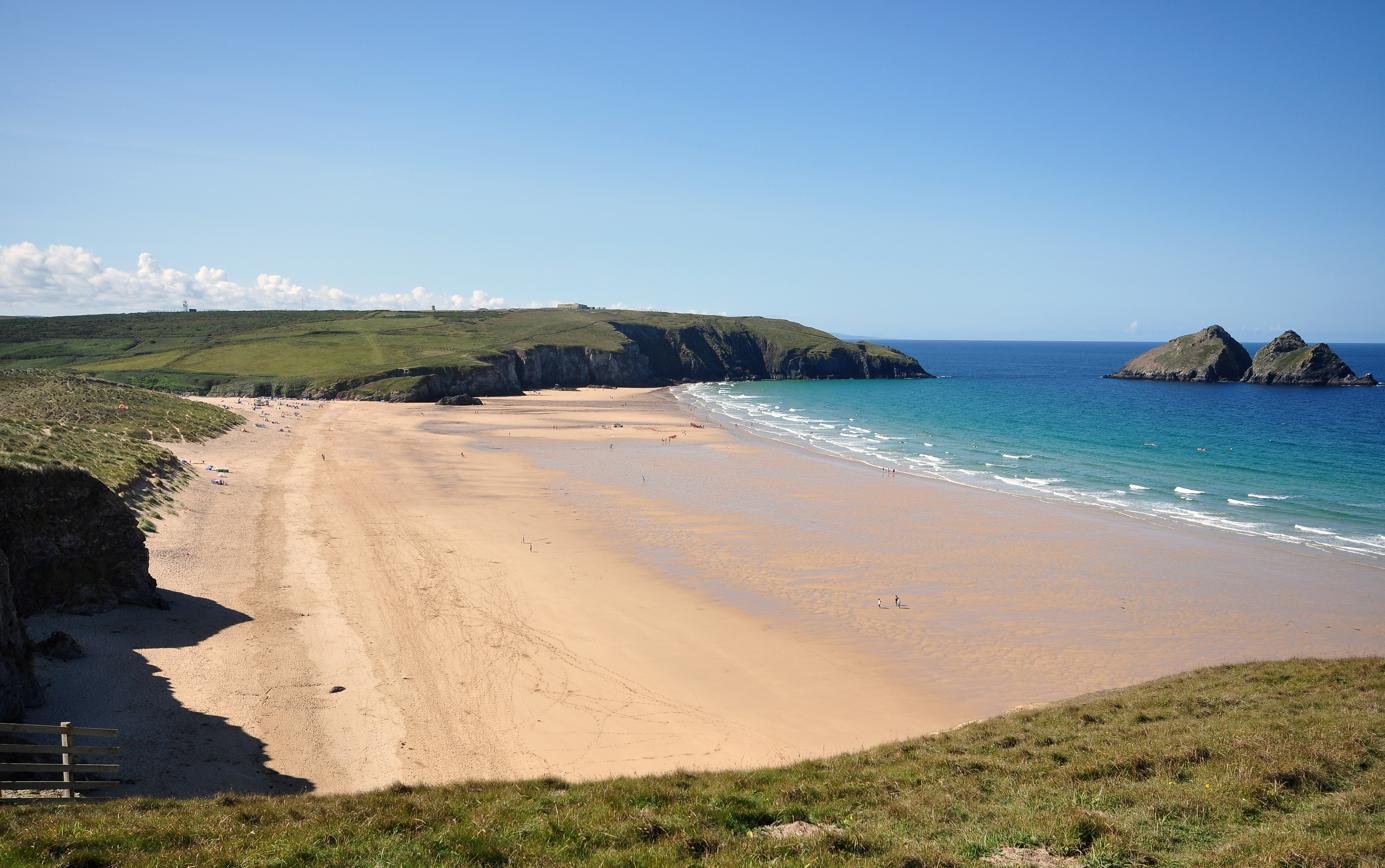
The beach at Holywell Bay

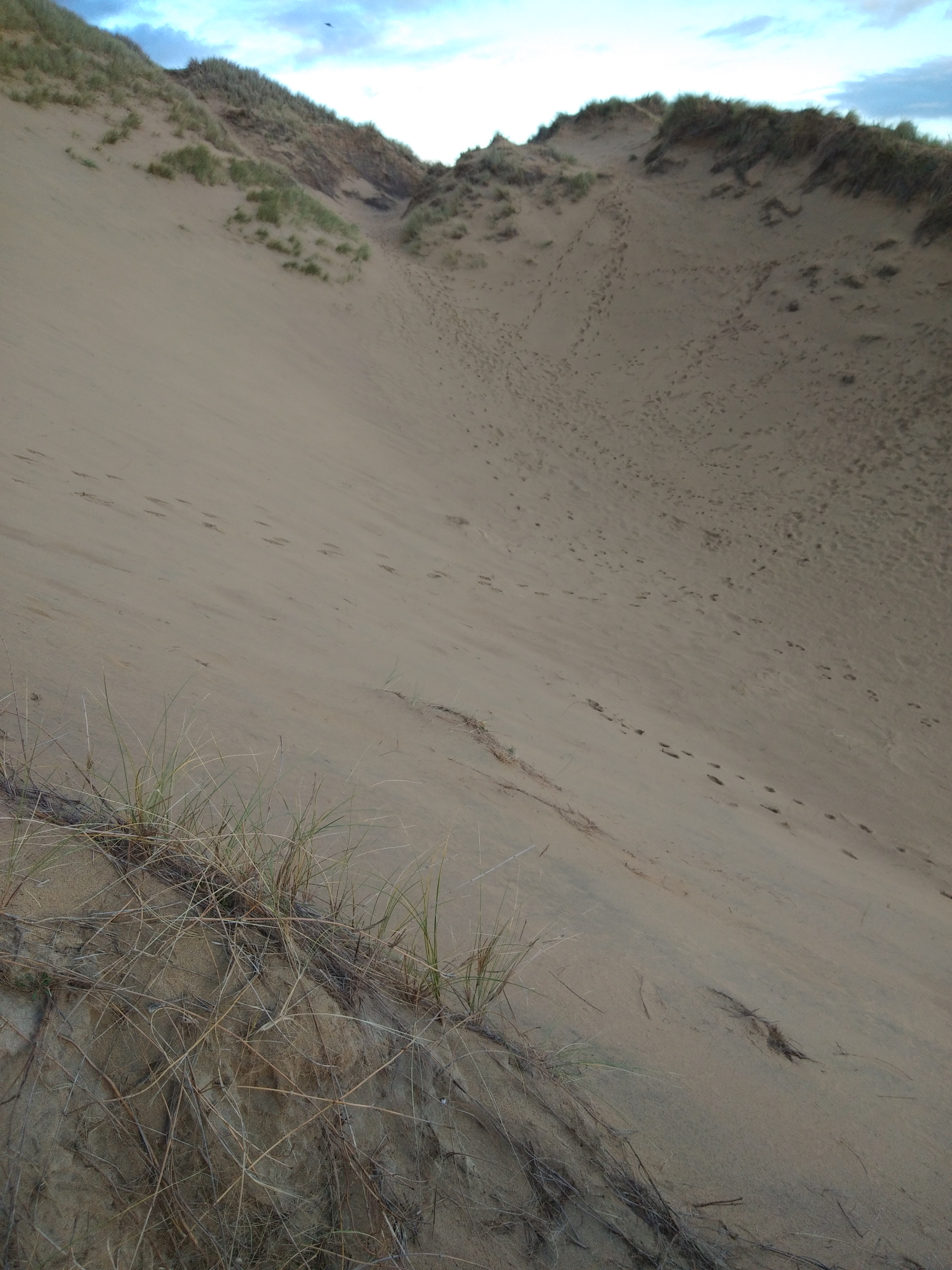
Sand dunes at Holywell Bay
