= Wycliffe and the House of Fear =

- First edition (publ. Victor Gollancz Ltd.)
- Author: W. J. Burley
- Language: English
- Publication date: 1995

Wycliffe and the House of Fear (1995) is a crime novel by Cornish writer W. J. Burley featuring detective Charles Wycliffe.

== Synopsis ==
For five hundred years, the Kemps, a fiercely Catholic family, have held onto their ancestral home of Kellycoryk, but when dwindling finances looked as though they might be forced into selling, patriarch Roger married the tough and uncompromising businesswoman Bridgit, who would only save the house if she could take it over for development, an idea that greatly displeased her husband. Then, without warning, she vanishes into thin air just as Roger's previous wife, Julia (another wealthy, independent woman), did several years prior, supposedly having been killed in a boating accident.

When Wycliffe, who has been recovering from an illness in the area, arrives on the scene, his curiosity aroused by the mystery of Roger's wives and his home, he soon suspects that the family know more about matters than they're letting on...
