= Sarah Badel =

British actress (born 1943)

- Born: Sarah M Badel; 30 March 1943 (age 83); London, England
- Education: Poles Convent, Thundridge
- Alma mater: Royal Academy of Dramatic Art
- Occupation: Actress
- Years active: 1962–2009
- Parents: Alan Badel; Yvonne Owen

Sarah M. Badel (born 30 March 1943) is a retired British stage and film actress. She is the daughter of actors Alan Badel and Yvonne Owen.

== Life and career ==
Badel was born in London to actor Alan Badel and actress Yvonne Owen. She was educated in Poles Convent, Hertfordshire and trained for the stage at the Royal Academy of Dramatic Art; she is now an Associate Member.

Sarah Badel made her acting debut in January 1963 in the Bristol Old Vic company's production of Hamlet, which was then touring India. Her first appearance in London theatre came in October 1964 in the part of Bella Hedley in Robert and Elizabeth at the Lyric Theatre. She made her Broadway theatre debut the following October playing Helen in The Right Honourable Gentleman at the Billy Rose Theatre.

In 1966, she performed at the Chichester Festival Theatre in such roles as Miss Fanny in The Clandestine Marriage and Anya in The Cherry Orchard. She returned to the Chichester Festival in 1967 and again in 1970. Other venues at which Badel has performed include the National Theatre Company and St George's Playhouse in Islington. She also took part in many radio dramas including adaptations of A Moon for the Misbegotten, Mourning Becomes Electra, and Lucia in London.

Badel made her first film appearance in the 1970 British comedy Every Home Should Have One. Other films in which she has appeared include The Shooting Party in 1985 and Not Without My Daughter in 1991. She made her first appearance on television in 1962 portraying Perdita in a television adaptation of The Winter's Tale.

She played Flora Poste in Cold Comfort Farm (1968) and Lizzie Eustace in The Pallisers (1974). In the 1980 BBC Television Shakespeare production of The Taming of the Shrew she played the lead female role of Katherine opposite John Cleese as Petruchio. Badel also had a role as Sister Magdalen (Avice of Thornbury) in two episodes of the TV series Cadfael (1994–1998). Other television productions in which she took part include She Fell Among Thieves, The Irish R.M., the 1996 adaptation of The Tenant of Wildfell Hall, and Just Visiting in 2001. She played Patricia Bradshaw in The Black Book, a 2009 episode of Midsomer Murders.

== Filmography ==
=== Film ===
Year	Title	Role	Notes
1962	The Winter's Tale	Perdita	TV film
1962	A Climate of Fear	Frances Waring	TV film
1965	Robert and Elizabeth	Bella Hedley	TV film
1970	Every Home Should Have One	Joanna Snow	
1978	Park People		TV film
1980	The Taming of the Shrew	Katherina (Kate) Minola	TV film
1984	Out of Order		TV film
1984	The Shooting Party	Ida Nettleby	
1991	Not Without My Daughter	Nicole Ajamian	
1994	Pleasure	The Widow	TV film
1995	Heavy Weather	Lady Julia Fish	TV film
1997	Mrs Dalloway	Lady Rosseter (Sally Seton)	
1999	Cotton Mary	Mrs. Evans	
2000	Longitude	Society Lady	TV film
2001	Just Visiting	Queen	

=== Television ===
Year	Title	Role	Notes
1962	Armchair Theatre	Veronica	Episode: "Thank You and Goodnight"
1963	ITV Play of the Week	Fay	Episode: "The Heart of the Country"
1968	Cold Comfort Farm	Flora Poste	Mini-series
1968	Mystery and Imagination	Elizabeth	Episode: "Frankenstein"
1969	W. Somerset Maugham	Louise	Episode: "Louise"
1970	Armchair Theatre	Sylvia Melville	Episode: "The Prime Minister's Daughter"
1970	BBC Play of the Month	Natasha	Episode: "The Three Sisters"
1972	The Visitors	Milly Purdoe	Mini-series
1972	Dead of Night	Lorna	Episode: "Bedtime"
1973	Conjugal Rights	Paula	Mini-series
1973	Between the Wars	Constance Lechdale	Episode: "Now Lies She There"
1974	The Pallisers	Lizzie Eustace	Mini-series
1974	Seven Faces of Woman	Liz West	Episode: "Let's Marry Liz"
1974	ITV Playhouse	Madge Wakely	Episode: "The Gift of Friendship"
1975	BBC Play of the Month	Goneril	Episode: "King Lear"
1976	Red Letter Day	Nicola	Episode: "The Five Pound Orange"
1978	BBC2 Play of the Week	Virginia	Episode: "She Fell Among Thieves"
1978	Do You Remember?	Peg	Episode: "Park People"
1979	Thomas & Sarah	Felicity Stokeleigh-Pomeroy	Episode: "The Biters Bit"
1981	Play for Today	Alice Dearth	Episode: "Dear Brutus"
1981	Play for Today	Alice Pike	Episode: "Bavarian Night"
1983	BBC Play of the Month	Olwen Peel	Episode: "Dangerous Corner"
1983–1985	Affairs of the Heart	Jane Bonamy	Series regular
1985	The Irish R.M.	Babs	Mini-series
1985	Summer Season	Natalaya Sergeyvena	Episode: "The House on Kirov Street"
1987	A Perfect Spy	Baroness Weber	1 episode
1988	Small World	Hilary Swallow/Joy Simpson	Mini-series
1990	Haggard	Lady Tartlet	2 episodes
1991	Fiddlers Three	Cynthia	Episode: "The Dark Horse"
1992	The Cloning of Joanna May	Angela	Mini-series
1994	Casualty	Celia Cooke	Episode: "Family Ties"
1994	Cadfael	Avice of Thornbury	Episode: "The Leper of St. Giles"
1995	Agatha Christie's Poirot	Florence Hubbard	Episode: "Hickory Dickory Dock"
1996	The Vet	Mrs. Eaves	Episode: "Stormy Weather"
1996	Masterpiece	Julia Fish	Episode: "Heavy Weather"
1996	Cadfael	Sister Magdalen	Episode: "The Rose Rent"
1996	The Tenant of Wildfell Hall	Rachel	Mini-series
1997	Heartbeat	Susan Williamson	Episode: "Fool for Love"
1997	A Dance to the Music of Time	Lady Molly	Mini-series
1998	Midsomer Murders	Rosa Carmichael	Episode: "Death of a Hollow Man"
2000	The Ruth Rendell Mysteries	Moira Wingrave	Episode: "Harm Done"
2001	Love in a Cold Climate	Lady Kroesig	Mini-series
2001	Hearts and Bones	Moira Thomas	1 episode
2001	Murder Rooms: Mysteries of the Real Sherlock Holmes	Mrs. Berkley	Episode: "The Photographer's Chair"
2001	Peak Practice	Sheila Spencer	1 episode
2005	Fingersmith	Mrs. Frobisher	Mini-series
2008	Tess of the D'Urbervilles	Mrs. Brooks	1 episode
2009	Midsomer Murders	Patricia Blackshaw	Episode: "The Black Book"

=== Theatre ===
Year	Title	Role	Venue	Notes
1962	Arms and the Man	Raina Petkoff	Bristol Old Vic, Bristol	India Tour
1962	Hamlet	Ophelia	Bristol Old Vic, Bristol	India Tour
1963	Heartbreak House		Bristol Old Vic, Bristol	
1963	The Physicists		Bristol Old Vic, Bristol	
1963	The Rivals		Bristol Old Vic, Bristol	
1964	Robert and Elizabeth	Cousin Bella	Lyric Theatre, London	
1966	The Cherry Orchard	Anya Ranevskaya	Chichester Festival Theatre, Chichester	
1966	The Clandestine Marriage	Fanny Sterling	Chichester Festival Theatre, Chichester	
1966	The Fighting Cock	Sophie	Chichester Festival Theatre, Chichester	
1967	The Italian Straw Hat	The Bride	Chichester Festival Theatre, Chichester	
1967	Heartbreak House	Ellie Dunn	Chichester Festival Theatre, Chichester	
1969	The School for Scandal	Lady Teazle	Theatre Royal, Bury St Edmunds	
1970	Arms and the Man	Raina Petkoff	Chichester Festival Theatre, Chichester	
1970	Peer Gynt	Solveig	Chichester Festival Theatre, Chichester	
1970	The Beaux' Stratagem	Mrs. Sullen	Royal Exchange, Manchester	
1971	Mrs. Warren's Profession	Vivie Warren	The Old Vic, London	
1976	Romeo and Juliet	Juliet	St. George's Theatre, London	
1976	Twelfth Night	Olivia	St. George's Theatre, London	
1981	The Cherry Orchard	Varya Ranevskaya	Chichester Festival Theatre, Chichester	
1989	The Black Prince	Rachel Baffin	Aldwych Theatre, London	
1991	Tovarich	Madame Arbesziat	Chichester Festival Theatre, Chichester	
1993	Quartermaine's Terms	Melanie Garth	Yvonne Arnaud Theatre, Guildford	
1994	The Seagull	Polina Andryevna	Theatre Royal, Bath	
2002	Cabaret	Fräulein Schneider	Chichester Festival Theatre, Chichester	
