= Valley Forge (play) =

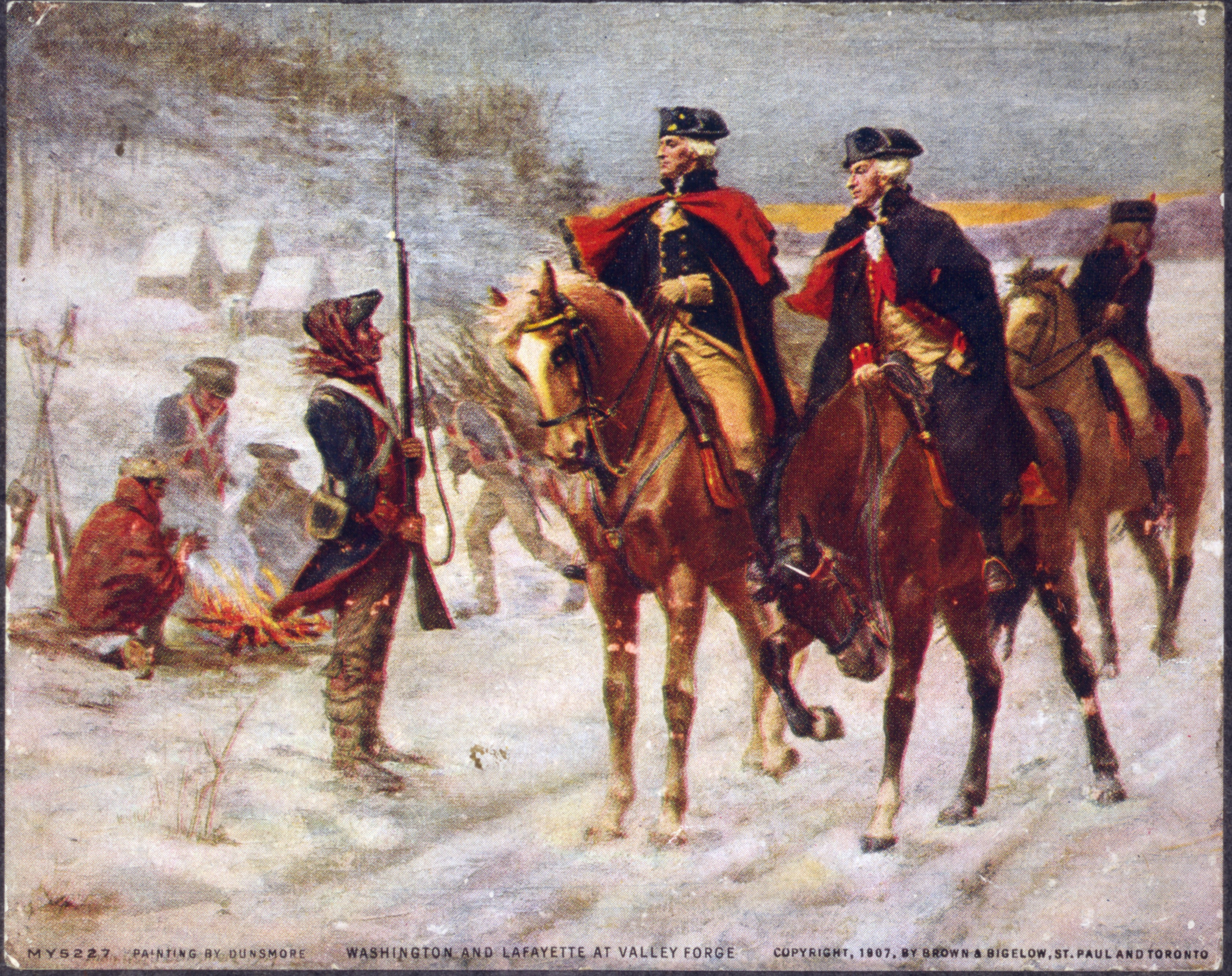
- Washington and Lafayette at Valley Forge
- Original language: English
- Written by: Maxwell Anderson
- Subject: Perseverance in difficulty
- Genre: Historical drama
- Setting: Bunkhouse at Valley Forge; Washington's Headquarters; Ballroom in Philadelphia; Barn on Hay Island; January 1778

Premiere
- Date: December 10, 1934
- Place: Guild Theatre
- Directed by: Herbert Biberman and John Houseman

Valley Forge is a 1934 three-act historical play by Maxwell Anderson, about the winter that George Washington spent in Valley Forge. It has four settings, a large cast, and slow pacing. It concerns Washington's struggle to keep faith with his soldiers amidst intrigue from General Howe and the British Army in Philadelphia, and despite little support and outright treachery from the Continental Congress. Like the playwright's earlier historical dramas, Elizabeth the Queen and Mary of Scotland, the play's action, though set in historical circumstances, is fictional.

The play was produced by the Theatre Guild and staged by Herbert Biberman and John Houseman. A minuet dance within the play was choreographed by Martha Graham, and had music arranged by Max Weiser. The settings were designed by Kate Drain Lawson and costumes by Carroll French. The original production starred Philip Merivale as George Washington. The play has had no Broadway revival, but was adapted for television on several occasions, starting in 1950.

== Characters ==
Only the principal characters are listed; many featured characters are omitted, as are walk-on parts in the ballroom scene.

Lead

- George Washington is the 46 year-old General commanding the Continental Army.

Supporting

- Spad is a Continental enlisted soldier, a scrounger type.
- Alcock is a Continental enlisted soldier whose homespun pants have worn away.
- Teague is an older Continental enlisted soldier, a veteran of frontier battles.
- Mason is a Continental enlisted soldier, who helps take care of a feverish young soldier.
- Lt. Cutting is a Continental officer, in command of the bunkhouse soldiers.
- Lt. Col. Lucifer Tench is an American officer on Washington's staff, an ardent patriot.
- Marquis de Lafayette is a 20 year-old French aristocrat who idolizes Washington.
- Sir William Howe is the 48 year-old General commanding the British Army in North America.
- Mary Philipse is a married loyalist, whom the playwright posits as a former interest of George Washington.
- General Stirling is one of Washington's ablest generals, who exposes Conway's disparaging talk.
- Thomas Conway is an ambitious Franco-Irishman serving as a Brigadier General in the Continental Army.

== Synopsis ==
The play opens with the interior of a one-room bunkhouse in Valley Forge. A dozen ragged Continental soldiers call it home, but not for long. Hunger, illness, the cold and lack of supplies are driving them to drift away, back to their real homes. When General Washington comes by with the Marquis de Lafayette to inspect the encampment, the men tell him of their wants and fear that Congress will neither pay nor supply them. They need to go home to hunt food for their families. Washington, though he shares their concern about Congress, implores them to stay despite their sufferings. If you leave now, he tells them, there will be no revolution left when you return.

Meanwhile, at a ballroom in Philadelphia where British officers are being entertained by loyalist families, General Howe meets Mary Philipse, now Mistress Morris, who was once close to a young George Washington. Howe decides to propose negotiations to Washington, using Mary as initial go between. He has heard that France is close to signing a Treaty of Alliance with America, and is anxious to negotiate before Washington hears the news. At first reluctant, she agrees to visit Washington at his camp, bringing Howe's offer with her. The next evening Mary meets with Washington. Though a committed loyalist she is ambivalent about persuading him to meet with Howe. Later, Washington and his staff discuss the proposal and he decides to accept the offer to meet.

The next morning, the bunkhouse soldiers argue about General Conway. He has made disparaging remarks about Washington to other senior officers. Conway has also met with two representatives of Congress in the camp, from a group trying to surrender to the British in order to restore trade. Washington confronts Conway and drives the two representatives out of camp. But he is concerned to alleviate the sufferings of his soldiers, which he feels can only be done by holding the army together to negotiate from strength.

Washington meets with Howe in a barn on Hay Island in the Delaware River. Howe warns Washington that his own tenure as commander of British forces in North America is ending, and the next general sent out may well be harder to deal with. Washington is torn by doubt, but his soldiers and aides shout to him not to give in, that they want liberty more than food or clothing. Washington breaks off the negotiations and reassures his men that their joint cause will continue its struggle. He observes to his men that "This liberty will look easy by and by when nobody dies to get it."

== Original production ==
=== Background ===
The first public notice of this play came with a newspaper article in late September 1934 stating the Theatre Guild was trying to decide whether Valley Forge or Rain From Heaven by S. N. Behrman would be the second production of their subscription season. By mid-October the Guild had decided to mount both plays, with Lawrence Langner and Theresa Helburn supervising production for Valley Forge. At the same time the Guild signed an India-born Englishman named Philip Merivale to play George Washington.

=== Cast ===
Principal cast for the tryouts in Pittsburgh, Washington, D.C., Baltimore and during the original Broadway run.
Role	Actor	Dates	Notes and sources
George Washington	Philip Merivale	Nov 19, 1934 - Jan 26, 1935	
Spad	Alan Bunce	Nov 19, 1934 - Jan 26, 1935	
Alcock	Victor Kilian	Nov 19, 1934 - Jan 26, 1935	
Teague	Grover Burgess	Nov 19, 1934 - Jan 26, 1935	
Mason	Charles Ellis	Nov 19, 1934 - Jan 26, 1935	
Lt. Cutting	George Coulouris	Nov 19, 1934 - Jan 26, 1935	
Lt. Col. Lucifer Tench	Stanley Ridges	Nov 19, 1934 - Jan 26, 1935	
Marquis de Lafayette	Edward Trevor	Nov 19, 1934 - Jan 26, 1935	
Sir William Howe	Reginald Mason	Nov 19, 1934 - Jan 26, 1935	
Mary Philipse	Ruth Weston	Nov 19, 1934 - Nov 22, 1934	Weston was announced as having "withdrawn from the cast" after three performances at the first tryout city.
Mary Philipse	Margalo Gilmore	Nov 23, 1934 - Jan 26, 1935	
General Stirling	Harold Elliott	Nov 19, 1934 - Jan 26, 1935	
Thomas Conway	Charles Francis	Nov 19, 1934 - Jan 26, 1935	

=== Tryouts ===
The first tryout was held at Pittsburgh's Nixon Theatre on November 19, 1934. Reviewer Kaspar Monahan said the opening night audience was largely composed of Guild subscribers, and that it was "warmly responsive" to the play. Monahan himself was enthusiastic about it, on both patriotic (Note: This was a common expression of tryout and Broadway reviewers for this play, and certainly colored their appreciation for it.) and dramatic grounds. He was most enthusiastic about the writing and Merivale's interpretation of Washington at this time as a man beset by doubts. He also appreciated the dramatic contrast afforded by the juxtaposition of the bunkhouse and ballroom scenes, and praised the acting of Stanley Ridges and Ruth Weston. Another local reviewer had read Anderson's manuscript before seeing the opening night performance; she said there was a major difference in that Anderson originally had Mary Philipse tell Washington about the coming French aid. The stage production removed this scene, strengthing the drama of Washington's eventual decision to not negotiate, at the expense of the Mary Philipse character, whose visit now seemed inconsequential.

The production went to the National Theatre in Washington, D.C., on November 26, 1934. The local critic called it a fine play, but remarked that "it still breathes of dress rehearsal days". They found the character played by Margalo Gilmore (Note: She had replaced Ruth Weston in the role of Mary Philipse.) a "strange interlude" that took the viewer away from Valley Forge. The settings lacked both "bold grandness" and "surefire frowsiness", "and if it was cold at Valley Forge than we escaped it."

Originally scheduled to hit Broadway on December 3, 1934, the production instead made a last minute detour to Ford's Theatre in Baltimore for another week's tryout. A booking change on such short notice was highly unusual for a Broadway-bound production, and made possible only by the Theatre Guild's ownership of the Manhattan venue. The Baltimore reviewer praised the playwright for presenting a human Washington rather than a legend, but noted of the storyline "there are times when it seems less like a plot than a discussion". He found the Act III dying declaiming of a consumptive soldier "as false as the sounds of skirmishing supposedly going on outside."

=== Premiere and reception ===
Valley Forge premiered at the Guild Theatre on December 10, 1934. Critical reaction was positive, but nuanced with a general sense the play was neither the equal of Anderson's previous efforts nor quite up to the usual Guild production standards. Brooks Atkinson thought the scene where Mary Philipse meets Washington "runs perilously close to theatrical solemnity" but was saved by the "craggy candor of Mr. Merivale's acting." He also thought the settings undistinguished: "the traditional Theater Guild magic is wanting here", but was impressed with the caliber of acting. Burns Mantle was one of several reviewers whose patriotism colored their assessment of the play's merits: "There are some.... who will get few thrills from Valley Forge, and I think I pity them a little. Their ancestral roots are not struck deep in American soil...". He also felt the production values were "skimpier than usual", but praised the acting of Philip Merivale, Stanley Ridges, Margalo Gilmore, and Victor Kilian.

Rowland Field wrote that Valley Forge "is a magnificent analysis of the character of a great man", complimented the playwright and all the leading performers, but spent most of the space recounting the story as if he were writing a history rather than a review. Arthur Pollock was impressed with the writing of Maxwell Anderson's play: "It is articulate as lightning and made eloquent by liquid language that is often liquid fire." However, he thought it too lovely for the time and place: "They are a little sound-drunk, these ragamuffins, the emaciated warriors of Valley Forge." Pollock judged Philip Merivale a fine performer but sometimes felt his delivery ambiguous; was the character weighing his words or the actor trying to remember them?

=== Closing ===
Valley Forge closed at the Guild Theatre on January 26, 1935. According to Burns Mantle, the play was successful and still making money, but the Guild wanted Philip Merivale, Margalo Gilmore, and Stanley Ridges to join Helen Hayes in a tour for Mary of Scotland, which would provide greater financial returns. (Note: A bit ironic given the play's disparagement of those who place crass commerce before the cause of liberty.)

== Adaptations ==
=== Radio ===
On January 3, 1935, while the original production was still running, Philip Merivale performed an extract from it on Rudy Vallee's radio show over the WEAF chain.

=== Television ===
- Kraft Television Theater featured the play as an episode aired February 22, 1950, with Judson Laire as Washington.
- Pulitzer Prize Playhouse aired a teleplay by Irving Elman based on the play, on February 23, 1951, which had Albert Dekker as Washington.
- Hallmark Hall of Fame presented a version, broadcast December 3, 1975, in which Richard Basehart played Washington.

== See also ==
- List of plays and musicals about the American Revolution

== See also ==
- Cultural depictions of George Washington
- List of plays and musicals about the American Revolution
