= List of plays and musicals about the American Revolution =

This is a list of plays and musicals about the American Revolution.

- Dearest Enemy – 1925 musical with a book by Herbert Fields, lyrics by Lorenz Hart, and music by Richard Rodgers
- Valley Forge – 1934 play by Maxwell Anderson
- Arms and the Girl - 1950 musical by Herbert Fields, Dorothy Fields, and Rouben Mamoulian, music by Morton Gould, and lyrics by Dorothy Fields.
- Ben Franklin in Paris – 1964 musical by Sidney Michaels
- 1776 – 1969 Broadway musical; Composed by Sherman Edwards
- The Ruckus at Machias – 1976 play by Richard Sewell
- A New World: A Life of Thomas Paine – 2009 stage play by Trevor Griffiths
- Jefferson's Garden – 2015 stage play by Timberlake Wertenbaker
- Hamilton – 2015 musical by Lin-Manuel Miranda
- My Dearest Friend – 2016 opera by Patricia Leonard

== See also ==
- Founding Fathers of the United States
- Commemoration of the American Revolution
- List of films about the American Revolution
- List of television series and miniseries about the American Revolution
