= Bill Brand (TV series) =

1976 British TV political drama series

- Genre: Political drama
- Created by: Trevor Griffiths
- Starring: Jack Shepherd
- Country of origin: United Kingdom
- No. of series: 1
- No. of episodes: 11

Production
- Producer: Thames Television
- Running time: 50 minutes

Original release
- Network: ITV
- Release: 7 June – 16 August 1976

Bill Brand is a British television drama series produced by Thames Television for the ITV network which was shown in 1976.

== Overview ==
Written by Trevor Griffiths, the series charts the political progress of the eponymous Brand, who becomes a Labour Party member of parliament for Layleigh, an industrial Lancashire constituency near Manchester, after retaining the seat for Labour at a by-election with a small majority. A former Liberal Studies lecturer at a local Technical college, Brand finds the demands placed on him by Labour Party whips and bureaucrats, and their links with employer boards and bankers, to be completely at odds with his left-wing socialist convictions.

Produced as one series of eleven episodes, Bill Brand stars Jack Shepherd in the title role. Arthur Lowe appeared as the Prime Minister, Arthur Watson (a character loosely based on Harold Wilson). Alan Badel played a left-wing Cabinet minister, David Last (a character based on Michael Foot), connected with The Journal, a thinly disguised Tribune newspaper. The decline of the textile industry, a major employer in Brand's constituency, is a secondary theme of the series. Geoffrey Palmer and Nigel Hawthorne were cast as moderate Trade ministers on the Labour right; the latter meets a delegation including Brand because his superior is engaged at a "City junket". Cherie Lunghi played Alex, a young woman with whom Brand has been having an extra-marital affair. The main cast also included Lynn Farleigh, as Brand's estranged wife Miriam, Rosemary Martin, as an MP who shares the same London house with Brand and other Labour MPs, and Colin Jeavons as a local constituency activist.

== Cast ==
- Jack Shepherd as Bill Brand (11 episodes)
- Allan Surtees as Alf Jowett (9 episodes)
- Lynn Farleigh as Miriam Brand (7 episodes)
- Rosemary Martin as Winnie Scoular (7 episodes)
- Douglas Campbell as Reg Starr (7 episodes)
- Cherie Lunghi as Alex Ferguson (6 episodes)
- Karen Silver as June Brand (6 episodes)
- Alan Badel as David Last (6 episodes)
- William Hoyland as Sandiford (5 episodes)
- Peter Howell as Venables (5 episodes)
- Philip Cox as Michael Brand (5 episodes)
- Peter Copley as Cedric Maddocks (5 episodes)
- Richard Butler as Tom Mapson (4 episodes)
- Dave Hill as Eddie Brand (4 episodes)
- Gary Roberts as Wilkinson (4 episodes)
- Geoffrey Palmer as Malcolm Frear (4 episodes)
- James Garbutt as Hughie Marsden (3 episodes)
- Richard Leech as Waverley (3 episodes)
- Colin Jeavons as Bernard Shaw (3 episodes)
- Clifford Kershaw as Frank Hilton (2 episodes)
- Arthur Lowe as Arthur Watson (1 episode)
- Nigel Hawthorne as Browning (1 episode)

== DVD release ==
The series was released on DVD in the UK in 2011.
