= Alan Badel =

English actor (1923–1982)

- Born: Alan Fernand Badel; 11 September 1923; Rusholme, Manchester, Lancashire, England
- Died: 19 March 1982 (aged 58); Chichester, Sussex, England
- Years active: 1952–82
- Spouse: Yvonne Owen (m. 1942)
- Children: Sarah Badel

Alan Fernand Badel (/bəˈdɛl/; 11 September 1923 – 19 March 1982) was an English actor who appeared frequently on stage, in film, on radio and on television.

== Early life ==
Badel was born in Rusholme, Manchester, and educated at Burnage High School. He fought in France and Germany during the Second World War, serving as a paratrooper on D-Day. He partially lost his hearing when a shell exploded near him.

== Career ==
Badel's earliest film role was as John the Baptist in the Rita Hayworth version of Salome (1953), a version in which the story was altered to make Salome a Christian convert who dances for Herod in order to save John rather than have him condemned to death. He portrayed Richard Wagner in Magic Fire (1955), a biopic about the composer. He also played the role of Karl Denny, the impresario, in the film Bitter Harvest (1963). Around the same time he played opposite Vivien Merchant in a television version of Harold Pinter's play The Lover (also 1963) and as Edmond Dantès in a BBC television adaptation of Alexandre Dumas' The Count of Monte Cristo (1964).

Badel also played the villainous sunglasses-wearing Najim Beshraavi in Arabesque (1966) with Gregory Peck and Sophia Loren. He played the French Interior Minister in The Day of the Jackal (1973), a political thriller about the attempted assassination of President Charles de Gaulle. In the political television drama Bill Brand (1976) he played David Last, the government's Employment Minister, a left-wing former backbench MP who had recently joined the front bench after 30 years in the House of Commons. One of his last roles was that of Baron Nicolas de Gunzburg in the Paramount film Nijinsky (1980). A television adaptation for the BBC of The Woman in White (1982) by Wilkie Collins, in which Badel played the role of Count Fosco, was shown posthumously.

== Personal life ==
Badel married the actress Yvonne Owen in 1942 and they remained married until his death from a heart attack in Chichester, aged 58. Their daughter, Sarah Badel, is an actress.

== Filmography ==
=== Film ===
Year	Title	Role	Notes
1952	The Stranger Left No Card	Stranger	Short film
1953	Salome	John the Baptist	
1953	Will Any Gentleman...?	The Great Mendoza	
1955	Three Cases of Murder	Owen/Mr. X/Harry	
1955	Magic Fire	Richard Wagner	
1961	The Complaisant Lover	Clive Root	TV film
1963	This Sporting Life	Weaver	
1963	The Lover	Richard	TV film
1963	Bitter Harvest	Karl	
1964	Children of the Damned	Dr. David Neville	
1966	Arabesque	Beshraavi	
1969	Otley	Alec Hadrian	
1969	Where's Jack?	The Lord Chancellor	
1969	The Siegfried Idyll	Richard Wagner	TV film
1970	The Adventurers	President Rojo	
1973	The Day of the Jackal	The Minister	
1974	Luther	Cardinal Cajetan de Vio	
1976	Where Adam Stood	Philip Gosse	TV film
1977	Telefon	Colonel Malchenko	
1978	The Medusa Touch	Quinton	
1978	Force 10 from Navarone	Major Petrovitch	
1979	Agatha	Lord Brackenbury	
1979	The Riddle of the Sands	Dollmann	
1980	Nijinsky	Baron de Gunzburg	
1980	Shōgun	Father Dell'Aqua	TV film

=== Television ===
Year	Title	Role	Notes
1951	Michèle and René	Poins	Episode: "Up the River"
1953	Omnibus	Fool/Napoleon	Episodes: "King Lear" & "The Man of Destiny"
1956–1957	Vanity Fair	Rawdon Crawley	Series regular, 6 episodes
1957	Sunday Night Theatre	Fouguier-Tinville	Episode: "The Public Prosecutor"
1958	Pride and Prejudice	Fitzwilliam Darcy	Series regular, 6 episodes
1958	Armchair Theatre	Don Juan	Episode: "Death of Satan"
1961	Theatre 70	Roger Webb	Episode: "The Substitute"
1962	ITV Play of the Week	Don Juan	Episode: "Don Juan in Hell"
1962	Thirty-Minute Theatre	Don Juan	Episode: "Don Juan in Hell"
1963	BBC Sunday-Night Play	The Prisoner	Episode: "The Prisoner"
1963	ITV Play of the Week	Hero	Episode: "The Rehearsal"
1963	Chronicle	Julius Caesar	Episode: "Four Views of Caesar"
1964	The Count of Monte Cristo	Edmond Dantès	Series regular, 12 episodes
1965	ITV Play of the Week	Tom	Episode: "A Couple of Dry Martinis"
1965	Famous Gossips	Oscar Wilde	Episode: "Oscar Wilde: Monsieur Sebastien Melmoth"
1966	Play of the Month	General Gordon	Episode: "Gordon of Khartoum"
1967	Theatre 625	Henry IV of England	Episode: "Henry IV"
1968	Play of the Month	Father	Episode: "The Parachute"
1968	The Wednesday Play	Rory Farquhar	Episode: "Toggle"
1968	Theatre 625	David de Beaudrigue	Episode: "The Fanatics"
1970	ITV Playhouse	Edward Kimberley	Episode: "The Creeper"
1970	Biography	Charles I	Episode: "A King and His Keeper"
1974	A Raging Calm	Tom Simpkins	Series regular, 7 episodes
1976	Bill Brand	David Last	Series regular, 6 episodes
1976	Play of the Month	Svengali	Episode: "Trilby"
1977	BBC2 Play of the Week	Michael Arlen	Episode: "Exiles"
1977	Play of the Month	Sir Robert Morton	Episode: "The Winslow Boy"
1978	Horizon	Henry Winstanley	Episode: "The Eddystone Lights"
1978	The CBS Festival of Lively Arts for Young People	Charles Dickens	Episode: "The Secret of Charles Dickens"
1978	The Sunday Drama	Buster Barnes	Episode: "The One and Only Buster Barnes"
1980	Shōgun	Father Dell'Aqua	Series regular, 5 episodes
1982	The Woman in White	Count Fosco	Series regular, 5 episodes
1982	Play of the Month	Sir Fretful Plagiary	Episode: "The Critic"
1982	The Agatha Christie Hour	Sir Alington West	Episode: "The Red Signal"
