= The Ruckus at Machias =

1976 play by Richard Sewell

The Ruckus at Machias is a 1976 play written by Richard Sewell. Originally written for students at Coburn Classical Institute in Waterville, Maine to enhance a unit on Maine history. The Ruckus at Machias has since been performed numerous times and won first prize at the Fremont Centre Theater Contest in California in 2004.

The Ruckus at Machias is "a play about individuals, as a history of democracy should be." Taking place in the small, sea-bound community of Machias, Maine, the play's action centers around first naval engagement of the Revolutionary War, the capturing of the British ship the Margeretta in 1775, known as the Battle of Machias.

== See also ==
- List of plays and musicals about the American Revolution
