= Wycliffe and the Guild of Nine =

- First edition (publ. Victor Gollancz Ltd.)
- Author: W. J. Burley
- Language: English
- Publication date: 2000

Wycliffe and the Guild of Nine (2000) is a crime novel by Cornish writer W. J. Burley. It is the twenty-second and entry in Burley's long-running Wycliffe series.

== Synopsis ==
On the moor west of St Ives, an artists' colony has been running on the site of a disused mine, run by the married astrologers Archer and Lina. The latest member is the shadowy and beautiful Francine, who hopes to invest a legacy into the business. Because of her Scorpio star sign, Archer isn't convinced, although Lina soon accepts her offer.

However, the trouble begins when Francine is found dead, killed by a deliberately blocked gas heater. Wycliffe soon makes his presence known as a murder investigation begins, and he quickly learns that several of the creative souls assembled have justifiable reasons for not wanting the police intruding on their private affairs. ...
