= The Seventh Veil =

- Film poster
- Directed by: Compton Bennett
- Written by: Sydney Box; Muriel Box
- Produced by: Sydney Box
- Starring: James Mason; Ann Todd; Hugh McDermott; Herbert Lom; David Horne; Yvonne Owen; John Slater; Manning Whiley; Albert Lieven
- Cinematography: Reginald Wyer
- Edited by: Gordon Hales
- Music by: Benjamin Frankel
- Distributed by: General Film Distributors
- Release date: 18 October 1945
- Running time: 94 minutes
- Country: United Kingdom
- Language: English
- Budget: £92,000
- Box office: £2 million (by Feb 1948)

The Seventh Veil is a 1945 British melodrama film directed by Compton Bennett and starring James Mason and Ann Todd. It was made by Ortus Films (a company established by producer Sydney Box) and released through General Film Distributors in the UK and Universal Pictures in the United States. The screenplay concerns Francesca (Todd), a brilliant concert pianist who attempts suicide while she is being treated for a disabling delusional disorder that seems to affect her hands, making it impossible for her to play. A psychiatrist uses hypnosis to uncover the source of her crippling fear and to reveal, one by one, the relationships that have enriched and troubled her life. When the last "veil" is removed, her mind is clear. She regains the ability to play and knows whom she loves best. The film's title comes from the metaphor, attributed to the fictional psychiatrist, that while Salome removed all her veils willingly, human beings fiercely protect the seventh and last veil that hides their deepest secrets, and will only reveal themselves completely under narcosis.

== Plot ==
Francesca Cunningham is a brilliant concert pianist suffering from a delusion that she has lost the use of her hands. Despairing, she slips out of the nursing home where she is staying and jumps into the river. She survives, but is unresponsive. Dr. Larsen, a psychiatrist specializing in hypnosis, leads Francesca to describe events in her life, that appear as flashbacks.

When she is 14, and at boarding school, music is "everything". Following a transgression, a teacher canes Francesca on her hands, causing her fingers to swell and thus ruining her chances of winning a piano scholarship that afternoon.

After the sudden death of her father, Francesca is placed in the care of his second cousin, Nicholas, a misogynistic bachelor who walks with a cane. Nicholas ignores her until a school report reveals that she is a gifted pianist. Nicholas does not play well, but he is a brilliant and inspiring teacher. They work for hours every day and he arranges for Francesca to become a pupil at the Royal College of Music; but he violently rejects her demonstration of gratitude.

At the college, Francesca meets Peter, a brash American musician studying in London, who charms her and opens a new world to her, including music (in particular a waltz) that Nicholas scorns as "suburban shop girl trash". Francesca proposes to Peter, who accepts, but when Nicholas hears the news he calmly orders her to pack a bag because they are leaving for Paris the following morning to continue her studies. When Francesca tries to defy him he reminds her that she is only 17, and under his control until she is 21.

Francesca tells Larsen that for the next seven years Nicholas never let her out of his sight as they prepared for her future as a concert pianist. Over and over again, he reminded her to take care of her precious hands. Prior to Francesca's debut concert in Venice, an old school friend visits her dressing room and tactlessly reminds her of the failed music exam; the stress is so great that, although the concert is a success, Francesca faints on stage at its completion. "I could almost feel my fingers swelling …" she tells Larsen.

Francesca’s career progresses and eventually she performs at the Royal Albert Hall, to an overwhelming audience response. Nicholas presents her with flowers after her performance, but she brushes past him to go out to find Peter. She finds him by chance, after seeing a poster outside the elegant nightclub where he leads the band. The band plays "their" waltz and they dance; but Francesca refuses to tell the doctor what happened next.

Instead, she tells him about Maxwell Leyden, an artist whom Nicholas commissions to do her portrait. Francesca and Max soon fall in love and decide to go to live in Max's villa in Italy. Nicholas is outraged. Francesca tells him she is grateful for many things, but will never forgive him for others. As he rants loudly that she belongs to him, Francesca plays the second movement (adagio cantabile) of the Piano Sonata No. 8 by Beethoven, louder and louder, drowning him out. Furious, he slams his cane down on the keyboard, just missing her hands. She screams and runs to Max who whisks her away in his car. But there is an accident and Francesca wakes in the nursing home with bandages on her slightly burned hands, irrationally convinced she will never play again. The story has come full circle.

While she is still under hypnosis, Larsen gets her to play the adagio, but the memory of Nicholas intrudes, and she faints.

Max removes her from the nursing home and refuses to let Larsen continue treatment. Larsen goes to Nicholas and plays a recording of the adagio, but Nicholas breaks the record. Larsen thanks him for revealing what Francesca means to him. Nicholas goes to Max's house and convinces Francesca that Larsen can help her.

Meanwhile, Larsen sees Peter, who tells him that the night Francesca returned, he told her he was married. However, he is now divorced. Larsen brings Peter to Nicholas's home, where Max also waits, and they go upstairs. We hear Peter's waltz, and then the adagio. Larsen descends while Francesca plays. He warns the three men that she is a new Francesca, no longer afraid, who will want to be with the one she loves, trusts, has been happiest with, and cannot live without. Nicholas withdraws to another room. Smiling, Francesca runs downstairs, through the door and into his arms.

== Cast ==
- James Mason as Nicholas Cunningham
- Ann Todd as Francesca Cunningham
- Herbert Lom as Dr. Larsen
- Hugh McDermott as Peter Gay
- Albert Lieven as Maxwell Leyden
- Yvonne Owen as Susan Brook
- David Horne as Dr. Kendall
- Manning Whiley as Dr. Irving
- Grace Allardyce as Nurse
- Ernest Davies as Parker
- John Slater as James

== Production ==
Sydney and Muriel Box were commissioned to film a documentary about shell-shocked soldiers being treated with the help of hypnosis. Muriel then began to think there was dramatic potential in the premise of hypnotherapy. The couple wrote the screenplay, and Sydney went on to produce the movie.

According to Mason, the original script concluded with Francesca choosing Peter as the one she loves. Mason and wife Pamela Kellino believed such an ending to be "wrong" and "rather dull."

The film score was written by Benjamin Frankel (credited as Ben Frankel) with original piano works by Chopin, Mozart, and Beethoven, as well as parts of the Grieg and Rachmaninoff 2nd piano concertos. The orchestral music is performed by the London Symphony Orchestra under the baton of Muir Mathieson.

Eileen Joyce, whose name does not appear in the credits, was the pianist who substituted for Todd on the soundtrack. She also made a short film for Todd to practise to, and even coached Todd personally in her arm movements. It is Joyce's hands that are seen in all the close-ups.

== Reception ==
=== Box office ===
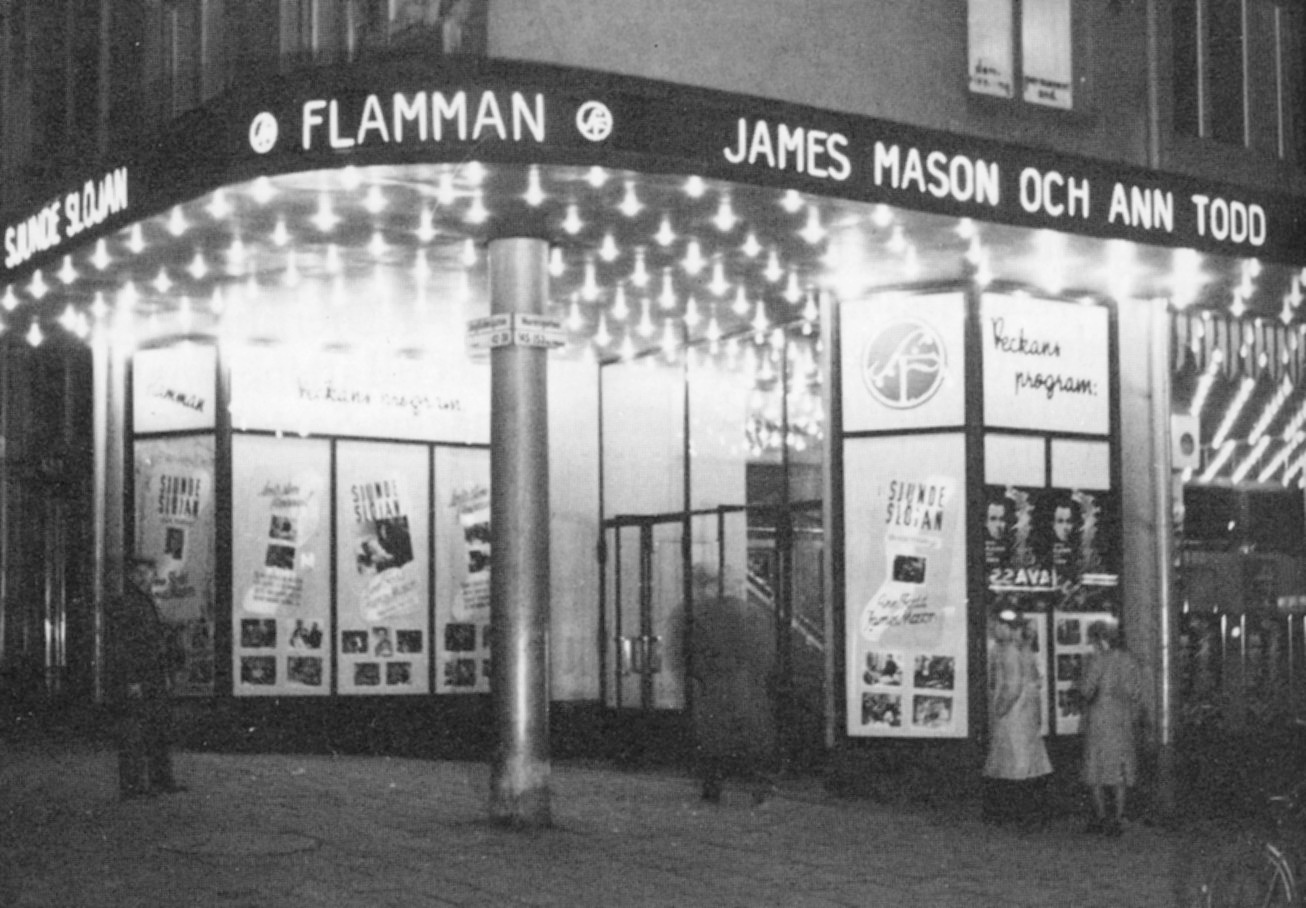
The film being shown at a Stockholm cinema.

Filmed on a relatively low budget of under £100,000, the film was the biggest British box-office success of its year. According to Kinematograph Weekly the "biggest winners" at the box office in 1945 Britain were The Seventh Veil, with Madonna of the Seven Moons, Arsenic and Old Lace and Meet Me in St Louis among the runner-ups. UK income was a reported £253,000.

Kinematograph Weekly called The Seventh Veil, Madonna of the Seven Moons, They Were Sisters and I'll Be Your Sweetheart "four dazzling examples of the box office wizardry of (Gainsborough) Ostrer."

In South America the film grossed $363,000 by May 1947. By February 1948, its box-office receipts were over £2 million worldwide.

In 2004, the British Film Institute compiled a list of the 100 biggest UK cinematic hits of all time based on audience figures, as opposed to gross takings. The Seventh Veil placed 10th in this list with an estimated attendance of 17.9 million people.

=== Critical ===
The film was entered into the 1946 Cannes Film Festival. It won an Academy Award for Best Original Screenplay (for Sydney and Muriel Box) that same year.

Pauline Kael called The Seventh Veil "a rich, portentous mixture of Beethoven, Chopin, kitsch, and Freud," adding that "[a]ll this nonsense is highly entertaining: maybe, with a few veils stripped away, most of us have a fantasist inside who gobbles up this sadomasochistic sundae, with its culture sauce."

Looking back at the movie and its reception, Todd said, "It was the film that had everything — a bit of Pygmalion, a bit of Trilby, a bit of Cinderella. Apart from all that it's an intriguing psychological drama and was one of the first films to have a hero who was cruel. Most male stars up to then had been honest, kind, upstanding, good-looking men that the female star was supposed to feel safe and secure with for the rest of her life when they finally got together at the end of the film. Not so with our smash hit. The men saw me as a victim and the women thrilled to Mason's power and cruelty, as women have thrilled to this since the world began, however much they deny it..."

== Adaptations ==
On 5 October 1946, This Is Hollywood presented The Seventh Veil. Ray Milland and Ann Todd starred in the adaptation.

The Seventh Veil was also presented by the Lux Radio Theatre on 15 September 1947, starring Joseph Cotten and Ida Lupino; and then on 13 December 1948, now starring Ingrid Bergman and Robert Montgomery.

Another version was broadcast by Philip Morris Playhouse on 3 February 1952. The 30-minute adaptation starred David Niven and University of Oklahoma student Edrita Pokorny.

In 1951, Ann Todd, Leo Genn (playing the Mason role), and Herbert Lom appeared in a stage adaptation of the same title in London.

== Notes ==
=== Bibliography ===
- The Great British Films, pp 88–90, Jerry Vermilye, 1978, Citadel Press, ISBN 0-8065-0661-X
