= The Lover (play) =

1962 one-act play by Harold Pinter

- Opening title ITV, 1963
- Original language: English
- Written by: Harold Pinter
- Genre: One-act play

Premiere
- Date: 28 March 1963
- Place: ITV

The Lover is a 1962 one-act play by Harold Pinter, originally written for television, but subsequently performed on stage. The play contrasts bourgeois domesticity with sexual yearning.

As with the drama of Anton Chekhov, some of Pinter's plays support "serious" and "comic" interpretations; The Lover has been staged successfully both as an ironic comedy on the one hand and as a nervy drama on the other. As is often the case with Pinter, the play probably contains both.

== Plot ==
Pinter leads the audience to believe that there are four characters in the play: the wife, the husband, the wife's lover and the husband's whore. But the lover who comes to call in the afternoons is revealed to be the husband adopting a role. He plays the lover for her: she plays the whore for him. As the play goes on, the man (first as the lover and then as the husband) expresses a wish to stop the pretend adultery, to the dismay of the woman. Finally, the husband suddenly switches back to the role of the lover.

== Original production ==
The play originally premiered in a 60 minute TV production directed by Joan Kemp-Welch for Associated-Rediffusion, transmitted by ITV on 28 March 1963.

- Husband/Lover - Alan Badel
- Wife/Mistress - Vivien Merchant
- Milkman - Michael Forrest

=== Reception ===
At the British Academy Television Awards Pinter won for Best Script, Badel and Merchant won for Best Actor and Actress, respectively, and Kemp-Welch won the Desmond Davis Award for outstanding creative work. The Lover also won the Prix Italia.

== Original London stage production ==
The Lover opened at the Arts Theatre on 18 September 1963 in a production by the author, as part of a double bill with his play The Dwarfs, and closed on 5 October.

- Richard - Scott Forbes
- Sarah - Vivien Merchant
- John - Michael Forrest

Critical reception

The Financial Times wrote: "The little play works simply beautifully, like a perfectly adjusted piece of miniature machinery, except that machinery is dead and this play is scintillating alive."
