= Ready When You Are, Mr. McGill =

- Red Letter Day episode
- DVD cover of the 1976 version
- Episode no.: Series 1 Episode 1
- Directed by: Mike Newell
- Written by: Jack Rosenthal
- Cinematography by: David Wood
- Original air date: January 11, 1976
- Running time: 52 minutes

"Ready When You Are, Mr. McGill" is the first episode of British anthology television series Red Letter Day which aired on 11 January 1976, written by Jack Rosenthal, and produced by ITV.

A 2003 remake was partly rewritten by Rosenthal.

== Plot ==
The Ready When You Are, Mr McGill story is centred on the making of a film. A television actor-extra (Joe McGill) is finally given a line to say to camera. While filming, a collection of comical mishaps (including the extra's repeated failure to deliver the line properly) occur to create chaos on-set.

Joe Black takes the lead role of Joe McGill. The story revolves around a British soldier and his relationship with a suspicious school mistress, set in 1940. McGill's line is "I've never seen that young lady in my life before, and I've lived here fifty years". Jack Shepherd plays the stressed director, and Mark Wing-Davey is his assistant.

== Release ==
"Ready When You Are, Mr. McGill" aired on ITV on 11 January 1976. It has been released on Region 2 DVD by Network, both as part of the compilation Jack Rosenthal at ITV, and as part of Red Letter Day box-set.

== 2003 version ==
In the 2003 adaptation, Tom Courtenay takes the lead role of Joe McGill. The story is centred on the making of a film starring Amanda Holden as a police officer and Bill Nighy as an increasingly frustrated director. McGill's line was, "I've never seen the young man in my life before, and I've worked here forty years."

=== Television industry ===
Rosenthal said his rewrite had turned the drama into a criticism of television executives, and argued that "the industry has gone crazy and it needs a new generation to change it into something better". He also criticised television schedulers. Although completed early in 2003, the resulting film was held back and had not been screened by the time Rosenthal died in May 2004; it turned out to be his last work. It was first screened, not on ITV but on Sky Movies 1, in September 2004.

Rosenthal's widow Maureen Lipman claimed that TV executives were reluctant to screen the film which was "maybe too acerbic". In April 2005, she challenged the management of ITV to show the film as a tribute to Rosenthal, threatening to kill them if it was put in a slot outside primetime. It was eventually shown on Boxing Day 2005 at 11:05 p.m.

== See also ==
- Extra (acting)
- Bit part
