= Yvonne Owen =

British actress (1923–1990)

Owen in Portrait from Life (1949)

Maire Yvonne Owen (28 July 1923 – December 1990) was a British stage and film actress.

== Life and career ==
Born in London in 1923. She was married to Alan Badel for 40 years, and they had a daughter together named Sarah.

In 1946 she appeared in the West End melodrama But for the Grace of God by Frederick Lonsdale.

She died in Chichester in December 1990, aged 67.

== Filmography ==
=== Film ===
Year	Title	Role	Notes
1945	The Seventh Veil	Susan Brook	
1946	The Years Between	Alice	
1946	A Girl in a Million	Molly	
1947	Holiday Camp	Angela Kirby	
1948	Easy Money	Carol	
1948	Miranda	Betty	
1948	My Brother's Keeper	Meg Waring	
1948	Quartet	1st. Gossip	
1949	Third Time Lucky	Peggy	
1949	Portrait from Life	Helen	
1949	Silent Dust	Nellie	
1949	Marry Me!	Sue Carson	
1950	Someone at the Door	Sally Martin	

=== Theatre ===
Year	Title	Role	Venue	Notes
1943	Acacia Avenue	Joan Robinson	Vaudeville Theatre, London	
1946	But for the Grace of God	Mary	St James's Theatre, London	
1953	Thieves' Carnival	Eva	Bristol Old Vic, London & Cambridge Arts Theatre, Cambridge	
