= W. J. Burley =

Cornish crime writer (1914-2002)

William John Burley
- Born: 1 August 1914; Falmouth, Cornwall
- Died: 15 November 2002 (aged 88); Holywell, Cornwall
- Education: Balliol College, Oxford
- Occupations: Author and teacher
- Known for: Crime novels featuring Charles Wycliffe

William John Burley (1 August 1914 – 15 November 2002) was a Cornish crime writer, best known for his books featuring the detective Charles Wycliffe, which became the basis of the popular television series Wycliffe, shown from 1994 to 1998.

Burley was born in Falmouth, Cornwall. Before he began writing he was employed in senior management at various gas companies, but after the Second World War he obtained a scholarship to study zoology at Balliol College, Oxford. After obtaining an honours degree he became a teacher. Appointed head of biology, first at Richmond & East Sheen County Grammar School in 1953, then at Newquay Grammar School in 1955, he was well established as a writer by the time he retired, at the age of 60, in 1974. He died at his home in Holywell, Cornwall, on 15 November 2002.

== Works ==
=== Wycliffe ===
- Wycliffe and the Three-Toed Pussy (1968)

The villagers of Kergwyns are baffled by the bizarre shooting of an attractive local woman, the only thing stolen from the scene being her left shoe and stocking, exposing a deformity in her foot. As Wycliffe investigates, he becomes acquainted with the life of the deeply unhappy woman, who routinely manipulated the men around her. When it becomes apparent that she left clues regarding her murder embedded in crossword puzzles the detective wonders why, if she knew about her impending death, she did nothing about it. Is some powerful person carefully stagemanaging the progress of the case?

- Wycliffe and How to Kill a Cat (1970)

An auburn-haired young woman turns up naked and strangled in a seedy hotel room by the docks, her face savagely beaten after death. The discovery of a thousand pounds stashed underneath some clothing, and of expensive luggage indicating more class than her present surroundings, exacerbates the mystery of her murder, and Superintendent Wycliffe finds himself drawn to the investigation, interrupting his seaside holiday so that he can make inquiries of his own.

- Wycliffe and the Guilt Edged Alibi (1971)

Caroline Bryce causes a scandal in her home village of Treen when her dead body is dragged from the bottom of a local river. Baffled as to a possible motive for the killing of Ms Bryce, Wycliffe mulls several possibilities. Could it have been a lover's quarrel, a family feud, or perhaps even the explosion of long-held resentment of the woman?

- Wycliffe and Death in a Salubrious Place (1973)

In a remote corner of the Isles of Scilly the body of a young woman has been found, her skull and facial bones smashed. The locals, scared and angry, turn against Vince Peters, a famous pop star who is a newcomer. Wycliffe is not convinced of his guilt and soon scratches away at the surface of the supposedly closeknit community, exposing an undercurrent of fear and hatred.

- Wycliffe and Death in Stanley Street (1974)

A prostitute has been found naked and strangled in her bed in a cul-de-sac just off the main road of a sprawling port. The local police view her murder as just another sex crime, but Wycliffe isn't so sure, partly because the victim, Lily Painter, wasn't a typical "lady of the night". She enjoyed Beethoven and had a variety of degrees to her name. Wycliffe discovers that she also had shady connections with smugglers and property speculators. It takes arson and another murder before he can wrap up this case.

- Wycliffe and the Pea-Green Boat (1975)

Somebody has booby trapped a boat owned by Cedric Tremain's father, killing him. Following Cedric's arrest his fellow villagers are unanimous in their belief that he isn't a likely murderer. However, circumstantial evidence begins piling up. When Wycliffe arrives he finds himself believing Cedric's protestations of innocence, and soon establishes a link between the current murder and that of a young woman who, twenty years before, was supposedly strangled by a cousin of Cedric's who served fourteen years of a commuted death sentence.

- Wycliffe and the Schoolgirls (1976)

Two very different women, a nightclub singer and a nurse, have been strangled in their own homes, with the same efficient method, within the space of one week. Although the media and the police believe that both murders are the work of a psychopath Wycliffe believes that the solution may be a bit more complex. When another attack is suddenly aborted for no apparent reason he feels that his theory has been proved. In the course of his solo investigation he uncovers connections with an old school trip, a youth hostel and a cruel practical joke played on a lonely student.

- Wycliffe and the Scapegoat (1978)

Every Halloween in Cornwall a lifesized effigy of a man is rolled down the cliffs and into the sea inside a flaming wheel, as part of a pagan ritual in which the effigy has replaced what was once a human sacrifice. This year, however, a local builder and undertaker, Jonathan Riddle, is strapped inside the blazing Ferris wheel and killed. Wycliffe's investigation proves almost as bizarre as the crime itself, with baffling new evidence and the eventual discovery of a solution stranger than anything he's ever encountered before.

- Wycliffe in Paul's Court (1980)

The small community of Paul's Court is shattered by the violent deaths of Willy Goppel, a German maker of dolls' houses found hanging from a beam in his home, and Yvette, a fifteen-year-old with a wild reputation found strangled, half-naked and thrown over a churchyard hedge. With the help of a local detective Wycliffe uncovers a string of antagonisms weaving across Paul's Court.

- Wycliffe's Wild Goose Chase (1982)

While taking a Sunday stroll along an estuary, Wycliffe stumbles across a service revolver with one recently fired chamber and becomes embroiled in a world of art robberies, crooked dealers, a suspicious suicide and the hunt for a missing yacht.

- Wycliffe and the Beales (1983)

The Beales, a reclusive family living in Ashill House on the edge of Dartmoor, consist of Simon, an old man entirely withdrawn from active life, Nicholas and Gertrude, perpetually hitting the bottle and playing war games, and the painter Edward, who takes long walks on the moor in search of artistic inspiration. The only one with any drive or ambition is Gertrude's husband Frank Vicary, and all his time is absorbed by running the family business. When a murder rocks their local community no one has any reason to suspect one of the Beales until Wycliffe arrives and finds his investigation leading him up the Beales' garden path.

- Wycliffe and the Four Jacks (1985)

The reclusive writer David Cleeve has been receiving mysterious warnings in the form of a single playing card, the Jack of Diamonds. When the card arrives torn in half a murder is committed the same evening. Holidaying in the area, Wycliffe uncovers a tale of double murder, arson attacks and other crimes reverberating down the years.

- Wycliffe and the Quiet Virgin (1986)

With his wife away for Christmas, Wycliffe readily accepts an invitation to stay with a Penzance lawyer and his family in their remote country home; although when he arrives he finds the atmosphere less than welcoming, and the unease soon culminates in the disappearance of a young girl, whom he had seen playing the Virgin Mary in a recent nativity play. He soon discovers that the missing youth was unpopular in her local community, and even her parents seem indifferent about the whole affair. Nevertheless, the detective leads a mass search for her and is soon caught up in a major criminal investigation.

- Wycliffe and the Winsor Blue (1987)
- Wycliffe and the Tangled Web (1988)
- Wycliffe and the Cycle of Death (1990)
- Wycliffe and the Dead Flautist (1991)
- Wycliffe and the Last Rites (1992)
- Wycliffe and the Dunes Mystery (1993)
- Wycliffe and the House of Fear (1995)
- Wycliffe and the Redhead (1997)
- Wycliffe and the Guild of Nine (2000)
- Wycliffe and the Last Lap (2003) unfinished

=== Henry Pym ===
- A Taste of Power (1966)
- Death in Willow Pattern (1969)

=== Miscellaneous ===
- The Schoolmaster (1977)
- The Sixth Day (1978)
- Charles and Elizabeth (1979)
- The House of Care (1981)
