= But for the Grace of God (play) =

But for the Grace of God is a play by the British writer Frederick Lonsdale. A murder melodrama, different from his standard light comedies, it ran for 203 performances at St James's Theatre in the West End between 3 September 1946 and 1 March 1947. The original cast included Michael Gough, A. E. Matthews, Mary Jerrold and Yvonne Owen.

== Original cast ==
- Alfred - Andrew Leigh
- Gerard - Michael Gough
- Sir William Altrey - Stuart Lindsell
- Johnny - Anthony Forwood
- George Duncan - H.G. Stoker
- Jimmy - Denis Gordon
- Charles - A. E. Matthews
- Geoffrey Wainwright - Hugh McDermott
- Inspector Rayle - J. H. Roberts
- Detective Orley - Cyril Smith
- Richard - Robert Douglas
- Molly - Marion Manisty
- Emily - Mary Jerrold
- Mary - Yvonne Owen

== Bibliography ==
- Wearing, J.P. The London Stage 1940-1949: A Calendar of Productions, Performers, and Personnel. Rowman & Littlefield, 2014.
