= Valley Forge (film) =

1975 American television film

- Genre: Drama; War
- Based on: Valley Forge by Maxwell Anderson
- Screenplay by: Sidney Carroll
- Directed by: Fielder Cook
- Starring: Richard Basehart; Harry Andrews; Simon Ward
- Theme music composer: Vladimir Solinsky
- Country of origin: United States
- Original language: English

Production
- Executive producer: Duane C. Bogie
- Producer: Fielder Cook
- Running time: 75 minutes
- Production companies: Clarion Productions; Columbia Pictures Television; Hallmark Hall of Fame

Original release
- Network: NBC
- Release: December 3, 1975

Valley Forge is a 1975 American made-for-television film adaptation of the 1934 Broadway play written by Maxwell Anderson, directed and produced by Fielder Cook. It was originally broadcast as part of the Hallmark Hall of Fame series of specials.

== Plot ==
The film concerns the American Revolutionary War encampment at Valley Forge, Pennsylvania and a planned escape by the men desperate to leave behind the terrible conditions of the winter.

== Cast ==
- Richard Basehart as General George Washington
- Harry Andrews as General William Howe
- Simon Ward as Major John André
- Victor Garber as General Lafayette
- Christopher Walken as The Hessian
- Edward Herrmann as Congressman Folsom
- Nancy Marchand as Annie
- John Heard as Mr. Harvie
- Woodrow Parfrey as Minto
- Lane Smith as Spad
- Josef Sommer as Brig. Gen. 'Dusty' Varnum

== Production ==
=== Writing ===
To condense the plot, the seventy-five-minute production entirely omits the play's principal female character, Mary Philipse.

=== Filming ===
Shot partly on location in Canada.

== See also ==
- List of films about the American Revolution
- List of American films of 1975
