= Red Letter Day (TV series) =

1976 British anthology

Red Letter Day is a 1976 British television anthology series screened on ITV, and produced by Granada Television. The series consists of seven teleplays that aired between 11 January 1976, and 22 February 1976. Each teleplay examined the events in a special day in someone's life. The series' first teleplay, "Ready When You Are, Mr. McGill", was nominated for the British Academy Television Award for Best Single Drama in 1977.

== Episodes ==
No.	Title	Cast	Directed by	Written by	Original release date
1	"Ready When You Are, Mr. McGill"	Joe Black; Jack Shepherd; Mark Wing-Davey; Barbara Moore-Black; Diana Davies; Joe Belcher; Peter Russell; Teddy Turner	Mike Newell	Story by : Teleplay by : Jack Rosenthal	11 January 1976
2	"The Five Pound Orange"	Sarah Badel; Peter Barkworth; Bernard Horsfall	June Howson	Story by : Donald Churchill; Teleplay by : Jack Rosenthal	18 January 1976
3	"Well Thank You, Thursday"	Judy Parfitt; Andrew Ray; Brenda Cavendish; Richard Griffiths; Lloyd McGuire	Brian Mills	Story by : Teleplay by : Jack Rosenthal	25 January 1976
4	"Amazing Stories"	Harold Kasket; Rula Lenska; Ian McDiarmid; Joe Melia; John Normington; Richard Willis	Peter Plummer	Story by : Howard Schuman; Teleplay by : Jack Rosenthal	1 February 1976
5	"Matchfit"	Roddy McMillan; Steven Pacey; Anne Reid; James Ottaway; Richard Beale; Angela Bruce	Gordon Flemyng	Story by : Brian Glanville; Teleplay by : Willis Hall and Jack Rosenthal	8 February 1976
6	"For Services to Myself"	Alan Dobie; James Hazeldine; Ronald Radd; Gwen Cherrell; David Allister; Arthur Blake; Richard Steele	Gordon Flemyng	Story by : Teleplay by : C. P. Taylor	15 February 1976
7	"Bag of Yeast"	Neville Smith; Alison Steadman; Gladys Ambrose; Jimmy Coleman; Bill Dean; Eric Mason	Michael Grigsby	Story by : Neville Smith; Teleplay by : Jack Rosenthal	22 February 1976
