= Jefferson's Garden =

2015 play by Timberlake Wertenbaker

Jefferson's Garden is a 2015 play by Timberlake Wertenbaker. It premiered at the Watford Palace Theatre from 5 to 21 February 2015, with Jefferson played by William Hope. It begins in the 1750s, but is centred on the period from 1776 to the early 1790s, covering the American Revolutionary War and its aftermath. It is named after Thomas Jefferson's gardens at Monticello and contrasts his part in writing the American Declaration of Independence with the continuation of slavery in the American colonies and on Jefferson's lands after independence.

== See also ==
- List of plays and musicals about the American Revolution
- Thomas Jefferson on slavery
