= Wycliffe and the Cycle of Death =

- First edition (publ. Victor Gollancz Ltd.)
- Author: W. J. Burley
- Language: English
- Publication date: 1990

Wycliffe and the Cycle of Death (1990) is a crime novel by Cornish writer W. J. Burley featuring his series detective, Charles Wycliffe.

== Synopsis ==
A local bookseller, Matthew Glynn, is found bludgeoned and strangled, setting Wycliffe on the trail of a killer whose identity is embedded deep within a mountain of family secrets. These include the vanishing of Matthew's wife years earlier, the increasingly bitter arguments with his brother, Maurice, over the sale of ancestral land, the mysterious seclusion of his other sibling, Alfred, the web of deception woven by their sister, Sara, and the discovery of important documents in Matthew's safe. And, as all of these sinister factors collude, the cycle of death continues and claims another life...
