= Holding Fire! =

Play written by Jack Shepherd

Holding Fire! is a play by the English playwright and actor Jack Shepherd. Making its debut at the Shakespeare's Globe theatre in London in July 2007, the play tracks the rise and fall of the Chartist movement in Britain during the first half of the 19th century. It is written in epic form and contains more than 50 speaking characters, including several historical figures such as William Lovett, Feargus O'Connor, Lord John Russell and General Charles Napier. The political drama is interwoven with the story of Lizzie and Will, two servants on the run from the police. The play was commissioned by the Globe as part of the Renaissance + Revolution series that constituted the 2007 season at the theatre.
