= In Lambeth (play) =

1989 play by Jack Shepherd

In Lambeth is a 1989 play by Jack Shepherd, centred on a meeting between William Blake and Thomas Paine in 1791. Its title quotes from Blake's poem Jerusalem (plate 37, line 14 - "There is a Grain of Sand in Lambeth that Satan cannot find").

== History ==
The play was first performed at the East Dulwich Tavern in London on 12 July 1989. and then at the Donmar Warehouse, directed by Shepherd himself and starring Bob Peck as Paine and Michael Maloney as Blake. Peck reprised the role (alongside Mark Rylance as Blake and Lesley Clare O'Neill as Katherine) in an adaptation of the play for television in the BBC Two Encounters series, which featured similar fictionalized meetings between historical figures. First broadcast on 4 July 1993, it was directed by Sebastian Graham-Jones

An anniversary tour of the play was produced by the group 'Love and Madness' from February to April 2010, this time starring Shepherd. The play is also being produced at the Southwark Playhouse between 10 July and 2 August 2014, directed by Michael Kingsbury and starring Blair Anderson, Melody Grove, Christopher Hunter and Tom Mothersdale.
