= Wycliffe and the Dunes Mystery =

- First edition (publ. Victor Gollancz Ltd.)
- Author: W. J. Burley
- Language: English
- Publisher: Victor Gollancz Ltd.
- Publication date: 1993
- ISBN: 0-575-05587-1 (first edition)
- Dewey Decimal: 823.914
- LC Class: PR6052.U647 W878

Wycliffe and the Dunes Mystery (1993) is a crime novel by Cornish writer W. J. Burley.
