= Jack Shepherd (actor) =

English actor, playwright and theatre director (1940–2025)

- Born: 29 October 1940; Leeds, West Riding of Yorkshire, England
- Died: 24 November 2025 (aged 85)
- Education: CSSD
- Alma mater: Drama Centre London
- Occupations: Actor; writer
- Years active: 1962–2025
- Spouses: Judith Harland (m. 1965, divorced) Ann Scott (m. 1975)
- Children: 5

John Shepherd (29 October 1940 – 24 November 2025) was an English actor, playwright and theatre director. He was known for his television roles, most notably the title roles in Trevor Griffiths' political drama Bill Brand (1976), and the detective series Wycliffe (1993–1998). His film appearances included All Neat in Black Stockings (1969), Wonderland (1999) and The Golden Compass (2007). He won the 1983 Society of London Theatre Award for Actor of the Year in a New Play for the original production of Glengarry Glen Ross. He was also nominated for the British Academy Television Award for Best Actor in 1977.

== Early life ==
Shepherd attended Roundhay School in Leeds and then studied fine art at King's College, Durham University (now the University of Newcastle upon Tyne). During his time in Newcastle he was an amateur actor with the People's Theatre. After gaining a BA he went on to study acting, first at the Central School of Speech and Drama and then as a student founder of the Drama Centre London. He was a talented musician too, playing in a jazz ensemble with fellow drama student, Jon Lord, later of Deep Purple and Whitesnake. Lord said of him in a 1982 interview, "In my early days I had a band with a lineup of piano, bass, drums, vibes, alto sax and clarinet so we were able to do some quite weird things. The alto sax player was Jack Shepherd, who later turned to acting. For me he was one of the best alto players and he introduced me to Charles Mingus and that school."

== Career ==
Shepherd worked at the Royal Court Theatre from 1965 to 1969, making his first appearance on the London stage as an Officer of Dragoons in Serjeant Musgrave's Dance. In July 1967, he played Arnold Middleton in David Storey's The Restoration of Arnold Middleton, which transferred to the Criterion Theatre, a performance for which he received the Plays and Players London Critics' Award as most promising actor of the year. In 1969, he starred in the satirical comedy series World in Ferment.

During the 1970s, Shepherd appeared in many television dramas, including several appearances in the series Budgie (1971–72). In Ready When You Are, Mr McGill (1976), by Jack Rosenthal, he played a television director struggling to maintain his composure during a doomed location shoot, and in Trevor Griffiths's Thames TV series Bill Brand (also 1976), a radical Labour MP. Both performances gained Shepherd Royal Television Society (RTS) Awards. He appeared as Renfield in Count Dracula (1977), with Louis Jourdan in the title role.

Shepherd also spent the decade running a drama studio in Kentish Town, north London along with fellow actor Richard Wilson, and during that time became interested in scriptwriting. He devised several plays for the theatre including The Sleep of Reason, Real Time, Clapperclaw and Half Moon.

In 1972, Shepherd was a founding member, along with Ian McKellen and Edward Petherbridge, of the democratically run Actors' Company, playing Vasques in 'Tis Pity She's a Whore, Inspector of Police in Ruling the Roost (Edinburgh Festival and tour) and Okano in The Three Arrows at the Arts, Cambridge in October 1972. In December 1972, he played Ben in David Mercer's Let's Murder Vivaldi at The King's Head Theatre, and in January 1973 took the title role in Dracula at the Bush Theatre, also collaborating in the writing.

His television work in the 1970s included All Good Men, Through the Night and Occupations, all by Trevor Griffiths.

From 1977 to 1985, he was a member of Bill Bryden's Cottesloe Theatre Company at the National Theatre, playing Teach in American Buffalo, Judas in The Passion, Boamer in Lark Rise, Thomas Clarkeson in The World Turned Upside Down, Smitty in The Long Voyage Home, The Correspondent in Dispatches and Hickey in The Iceman Cometh. Shepherd originated the stage role of Richard Roma in Glengarry Glen Ross at the Cottesloe in 1983, for which he received a Society of West End Theatre award (later known as the Laurence Olivier Awards) as Actor of the Year in a New Play.

Shepherd's first written work for the stage was In Lambeth, an imaginary conversation about revolution between the poet and artist William Blake, his wife Catherine and Thomas Paine, author of The Rights of Man. He first directed it at the Partisan Theatre in July 1989 before its transfer to the Donmar Warehouse, winning the 1989 Time Out Awards for Best Directing and Best Writing.

Shepherd's work in television during the 1980s and 1990s, included Blind Justice, a miniseries by Peter Flannery, and culminated in his acclaimed role as the eponymous Detective Superintendent Charles Wycliffe in the HTV television series Wycliffe from 1993 to 1998. He appeared as Butler the Butler in the 1996 television miniseries Over Here.

As a theatre director, Shepherd staged several productions at the Shakespeare's Globe, including his 'Prologue Production' of The Two Gentlemen of Verona, starring Mark Rylance as Proteus, which opened the Globe to the theatregoing public in August 1996, a year before the formal opening Gala. In 1998, at the Globe he played Antonio in Richard Olivier's production of The Merchant of Venice.

Shepherd's epic drama about the Chartist movement, Holding Fire!, was commissioned by the Shakespeare's Globe Theatre as part of its Renaissance and Revolution season, and was first staged there by Mark Rosenblatt in August 2007.

He played the part of the Father in Rupert Goold's production of Six Characters in Search of an Author in 2009, the Doctor in The Master Builder at the Almeida, and Melchior, one of the Magi, in the four-part TV drama The Nativity, broadcast on BBC One in December 2010.

He played Ralph Palmer (from a 1980s case) in the 2011 episode "Solidarity” of TV series Waking the Dead. In 2013, he played Harry in "Home" by David Storey at the Arcola Theatre and Joe in the BBC TV seriesThe Politician's Husband. In 2014, Serebryakov in "Uncle Vanya at the St James Theatre. Also, in 2014/15, he toured in three ghost stories, Whistle and I'll Come to You, and The Signalman for Middleground Theatre Company, and in 2015/6 with the same company he toured in a stage adaptation of the film The Verdict. 2017/2018 he played Art Hockstadder in Gore Vidal's play The Best Man, first on tour and then at the Playhouse Theatre London.

Shepherd's interest in community theatre led to adaptations of Dorian Gray and of Hardy's Under the Greenwood Tree for the Players Collective in Lewes. His version of the latter was performed by the Hardy Players in Dorchester in December 2016.

He wrote and directed a new play titled The Cutting Edge, starring Maggie Steed. It premiered at the Arcola Theatre in 2020, but closed almost immediately due to COVID-19.

== Personal life and death ==
Shepherd married Judith Harland in 1965, and they had two children, Jan and Jake Shepherd. The couple later divorced. In 1975, he married film and television producer Ann Scott. They had three children together, Victoria, Catherine and Ben Shepherd.

Shepherd died in hospital on 24 November 2025 at the age of 85 following a short illness.

== Plays ==
Plays by Jack Shepherd include:

- The Incredible Journey of Sir Francis Younghusband (Royal Court Upstairs)
- The Sleep of Reason (Traverse Theatre, Edinburgh) 1973
- Clapperclaw (BBC Two) 1981
- Real Time (directed and devised with the Joint Stock Theatre Company) 1982
- Revelations (Bridge Lane, London) 1983
- In Lambeth (Partisan Theatre and Donmar Warehouse) 1989. Published by Methuen.
- Comic Cuts (Derby Playhouse, Salisbury Theatre and Lyric Studio, Hammersmith) 1995
- Chasing the Moment (Southwark Playhouse) 1994 and (BAC1 London) 1995 dir. Janos Bruck, (revived Arcola, Dalston) 2007 dir. Mehmet Ergen. Published by First Write
- Half Moon (Southwark Playhouse) 1998
- Through a Cloud (Birmingham Rep and Drum, Plymouth) 2004), revived Arcola) 2005. Published by Nick Hern Books.
- Man Falling Down: A Mask Play (devised and co-written with Oliver Cotton, Shakespeare's Globe) 2005
- Holding Fire! (Shakespeare's Globe) 2007. Published by Nick Hern Books
- The Cutting Edge (Arcola Theatre, 2020)

Co-wrote with Keith Dewhurst Impossible Plays, an account of his years in Bill Bryden's Cottesloe Company at the National Theatre. Published by Methuen.

Two of his later plays were Against the Tide, about William Morris, and The Valley of the Shadow, about World War I.

== Theatre ==
Year	Title	Role	Theatre Company	Director	Notes
1971	Confessions of a Justified Sinner	Gil-Martin	Lyceum Theatre, Edinburgh	Richard Eyre	Edinburgh International Festival

== Filmography ==
- Two and Two Make Six (1962) .... Grand Hotel Night Receptionist (uncredited)
- All Neat in Black Stockings (1969) .... Dwyer
- The Bed Sitting Room (1969) .... Under Water Vicar
- The Virgin Soldiers (1969) .... Sergeant Wellbeloved
- Special Branch (1969) .... Peter Watson
- The Last Valley (1971) .... Eskesen
- Budgie (1971, TV Series) .... PC Donnelly
- Something to Hide (1972) .... Joe Pepper
- Crown Court (1974) ('How to Steal a Memory Bank')....Sam Warren
- All Good Men (1974) TV movie
- Occupations (1974) TV movie
- Through the Night (1975) TV movie
- Bill Brand (1976, TV series) .... Bill Brand
- Ready When You Are, Mr. McGill (1976) (episode 1 of Red Letter Day) – Phil Parish – Director
- Count Dracula (1977, TV Movie) .... Renfield
- The Devil's Crown (1978, TV Series) .... Thomas Becket
- Scoop (1987, TV Movie) .... The Journey – Corker
- Escape from Sobibor (1987, TV Movie) .... Itzhak Lichtman
- Body Contact (1987) .... Dickie Finn
- Lights and Shadows (1988)
- Murderers Among Us: The Simon Wiesenthal Story (1989, TV Movie) .... Brodi
- Ball Trap on the Cote Sauvage (1989, TV Movie) .... Joe Marriot
- Shoot to Kill (1990, TV Movie) .... John Stalker
- The Big Man (1990) .... Referee
- Crimestrike (1990)
- The Object of Beauty (1991) .... Mr. Slaughter
- Twenty-One (1991) .... Kenneth
- Blue Ice (1992) .... Stevens
- Blue Black Permanent (1992) .... Philip Lomax
- Wycliffe (1993–1998, TV Series) .... Det. Supt. Wycliffe
- No Escape (1994) .... Dysart
- Over Here (1996, TV Movie) .... Butler
- The Scarlet Tunic (1998) .... Dr. Edward Grove
- Wonderland (1999) .... Bill
- The Martins (2001) .... DI Tony Branch
- Charlotte Gray (2001) .... Paul Pichon
- Silent Witness episode Closed Ranks (2002) .... ACC Richard Dyer
- Boudica (2003) .... Claudius
- A Cock and Bull Story (Tristram Shandy) (2005) .... Surgeon
- Lipstick (2005, Short) .... Man
- All About George (2005, TV Series) .... Gordon Kinsey
- A Dad from Christmas (2006, TV Movie) .... Bert
- The Golden Compass (2007) .... Master
- God on Trial (2008, TV Movie) .... Khun
- Thorne (2010, TV series) .... Jim Thorne
- The Nativity (2010, TV Mini-Series) .... Melchior
- The Politician's Husband (2013, TV Mini-Series) .... Joe Hoynes
- Greyhawk (2014) .... Howard
- New Tricks (2014, TV Series) .... William Taskerland
- Midsomer Murders (2015, TV Series) .... Magnus Soane
- Greed (2019 Film) .... Eric Weeks
- Manhunt: The Night Stalker, Part 2 (2021, TV Series) .... Dave Sutton

== Publications ==
- Impossible Plays: Adventures With the Cottesloe Company by Keith Dewhurst and Jack Shepherd, Methuen Drama (2006) ISBN 0-413-77585-2

== Sources ==
- Who's Who in the Theatre. 17th edition, Gale Publishing (1981) ISBN 0-8103-0235-7
- Halliwell's Film Guide
- Halliwell's Who's Who in the Movies
- Theatre Record indexes
