= Wycliffe and the Last Rites =

- First edition (publ. Victor Gollancz Ltd.)
- Author: W. J. Burley
- Language: English
- Publication date: 1992

Wycliffe and the Last Rites (1992) is a crime novel by Cornish writer W. J. Burley featuring his series detective Charles Wycliffe.

== Synopsis ==
The vicar of Moresk, a quiet Cornish village, is shocked by the discovery of a woman's corpse sprawled across the church steps, raising suspicion that a satanic ritual has taken place in the grounds. Wycliffe slowly becomes convinced that the murder is an expression of hatred for the whole community, instead of just the victim herself.

When another slaying strikes the area, he develops a theory about who the killer could be; but can he prove it?
