= Wycliffe and the Redhead =

Crime novel

- First edition (publ. Victor Gollancz Ltd.)
- Author: W. J. Burley
- Language: English
- Publication date: 1997

Wycliffe and the Redhead (1997) is a crime novel by Cornish writer W. J. Burley.

== Synopsis ==
Simon Meagor, a lonely bookseller and divorcee, ends up falling for pretty redhead Morwenna, whose father killed himself as a result of Simon's testimony in a murder trial several years ago. Initially horrified by the young woman's application for a job in his shop, he reluctantly accepts and, mesmerised by her charms, remains oblivious as she steadily manipulates her way into every corner of his life, before mysteriously disappearing.

Her body eventually shows up in a flooded quarry and police suspect suicide, especially after the discovery that she was suffering from a fatal illness, but soon all the evidence begins pointing towards foul play and Simon becomes prime suspect. Furthermore, Wycliffe finds himself immersed in a sea of dark and murky secrets from the past...
