= Helen Masters =

English actress (born 1963)

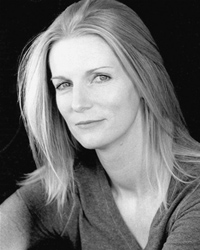
- Born: 10 April 1963 (age 63); Coventry, West Midlands, England
- Occupation: Actress
- Years active: 1985 – present

Helen Masters (born 10 April 1963) is an English actress who has appeared on stage, film and TV.

== Early life ==
Helen Masters grew up in Warwickshire. She attended Kings High School, Warwick, and Solihull School. She went on to study at the Webber Douglas Academy of Dramatic Art.

== Personal life ==
Masters lives in London and is married to John McRoberts with whom she has two children.

== Career ==
=== Stage ===
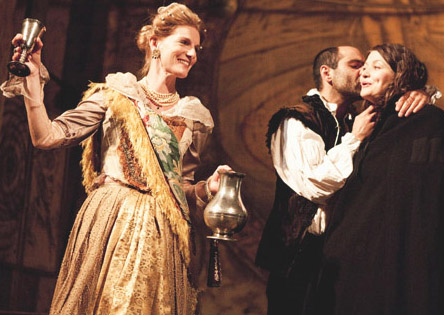
Helen Masters as Lady Magdalene Danvers in Jonathan Holmes's play "Into Thy Hands"

After graduating, Masters made her first stage appearance at the Edinburgh Festival in East and A Clockwork Orange. She went on to play Laurie in The Traveller at the Leicester Haymarket (1987), which transferred to the Almeida Theatre (1988); Emilie, and later on the role of Madame de Tourvel, in the West End production of Les Liaisons Dangereuses at the Ambassadors Theatre (1989); Yelena in Marya at the Old Vic directed by Roger Michell (1990); Ellen in Acid Hearts at the Finborough Theatre (1992); amd Emma in Betrayal at the Chester Gateway Theatre (1994).

In July 2011, Masters returned to the stage to play the role of Lady Magdalene Danvers in Into Thy Hands, a new play written and directed by Jonathan Holmes at Wiltons Music Hall, London.

In March 2011, Masters played Molly in Revolution Square, again written and directed by Jonathan Holmes, at the Bush Theatre, London.

=== Television ===
Masters' work in television increased during the early 1990s, culminating in her portrayal of DI Lucy Lane in the HTV television series Wycliffe from 1994 to 1998.

== Selected filmography ==
Film and television
Year	Film	Role	Notes
1985	A Wreath of Roses	Margie	TV movie
1985	Made in Heaven		TV
1991	Drop the Dead Donkey	Director	TV
1993	Minder	Janice	TV
1993	Diana: Her True Story	Sarah Spencer	TV film
1993	Paul Merton: The Series	Various	TV
1994	Wycliffe (Series I)	DI Lucy Lane	TV
1995	Wycliffe (Series II)	DI Lucy Lane	TV
1996	Wycliffe (Series III)	DI Lucy Lane	TV
1997	Wycliffe (Series IV)	DI Lucy Lane	TV
1997	Wycliffe (Dance of the Scorpions)	DI Lucy Lane	TV film
1998	Wycliffe (Series V)	DI Lucy Lane	TV
2001	The Savages	Barbara	TV
2001	The Affair of the Necklace	Madame Campan	Film
2003	A Touch of Frost	Eileen Cleary	TV
2003	Holby City	Jodie Lewis	TV
2003	The Magdalene Sisters	Sister Bridget	
2004	Belonging	Hazel	TV movie
2006	Super Sleuths		TV documentary
2007	Midsomer Murders	Jane Benbow	TV
2009	Top of the Cops		TV documentary
2010	The People's Detective		TV documentary
2011	Doctors	Susan Watts	TV
