= Wycliffe and the Dead Flautist =

- First edition (publ. Victor Gollancz Ltd.)
- Author: W. J. Burley
- Language: English
- Publication date: 1991

Wycliffe and the Dead Flautist (1991) is a crime novel by the Cornish writer W. J. Burley.

== Synopsis ==
When the body of amateur flautist Tony Mills is found shot dead by his own gun on the secluded estate of Lord and Lady Bottrell, everyone simply assumes suicide.

However, upon closer inspection, it reveals some sinister inconsistencies and Wycliffe soon opens a murder investigation, unravelling as he does so the mystery of Mills's last days and the disappearance of Lizzie Biddick, a maid who worked for the Bottrells several years ago.

Eventually, the case takes on a more urgent edge as another body shows up, the result of bitter family feuds and the exposure of illicit relationships.
