= Wycliffe and the Tangled Web =

- First edition (publ. Victor Gollancz Ltd.)
- Author: W. J. Burley
- Language: English
- Publication date: 1988

Wycliffe and the Tangled Web (1988) is a crime novel by Cornish writer W. J. Burley.

== Synopsis ==
Shortly after informing her boyfriend and sister of her pregnancy, a young woman from a quiet Cornish village goes missing, opening up the possibility that she may have been raped or murdered. When a body surfaces, Wycliffe thinks he may have solved the vanishing, but his theory is soon dashed after an identification proves it isn't her. As he recommences his investigation, he steadily unwinds a tangled web of complex family relationships, rivalries and pure hatred, and ultimately uncovering the unclaimed corpse as a red herring.
