= John Adams (Virginia politician) =

American politician (1773–1825)

25th Mayor of Richmond, Virginia
- In office 1819–1825

Member of the Virginia House of Delegates from Richmond City
- In office December 6, 1802 – December 2. 1804
- Preceded by: George W. Smith
- Succeeded by: William DuVal

Personal details
- Born: 14 July 1773 Richmond, Colony of Virginia
- Died: 23 June 1825 (aged 51) Richmond, Virginia, U.S.
- Spouse: Margaret Winston
- Relations: Thomas Adams (Uncle)
- Children: Mary Griffin; Eliza; Martha Winston; Margaret; Louisa; Elvira; John; Richard Henry; and Lavinia
- Education: University of Edinburgh
- Profession: Physician; politician

John Adams (14 July 1773 – 23 June 1825) was an American physician who served two terms in the Virginia House of Delegates representing his native Richmond from 1802 to 1804 and served as its mayor from 1819 to 1825.

== Early life and education ==
This John Adams (who shares the name but has no known relation to the second President of the United States) was born on July 14, 1773, the tenth child of wealthy merchant, patriot and politician Richard Adams and his wife, the former Elizabeth Griffin. Like his immigrant father (this boy's grandfather) Ebenezer Adams, Richard Adams was a planter and merchant in New Kent County, Virginia. His wife Elizabeth Griffin, was the daughter of Leroy and Mary Anne (Bertrand) Griffin of Lancaster County in the Northern Neck of Virginia. His father would become an ardent patriot before and during the American Revolutionary War (during this boy's youth), as would his mother's lawyer brother, Cyrus Griffin of Williamsburg, would become a delegate to the Continental Congress in 1778, 1781, 1787, president of the body in 1788, and later a U.S. District Court Judge. His parents had married nearly two decades earlier, in 1755. The exact date that Richard moved his family to Richmond is uncertain, but this boy was born in Richmond well after his father had begun representing surrounding Henrico County in the House of Burgesses (and would later serve in the Virginia Revolutionary Conventions).

His father and mother had eleven children, of whom one, Ebenezer, died in infancy, and three more died unmarried (Tabitha, Elizabeth Griffin, and William Adams). Thomas Bowler Adams, the eldest son, married Sara Morrison. Richard Adams Jr., born 14 months after his brother, married two widows but had no children (his first wife was Mrs. Elizabeth (Southall) Randolph, and second Mrs. Sara Travers (Daniel) Hay). The last-born child (and son) was Samuel Griffin Adams, whose sons, James Innes Adams and Thomas Adams, would move south to Alabama, where they built homes on Mobile Bay at Montrose, Alabama. The home of James Innes Adams, a riverboat captain, still stands on Mobile Bay and is listed on the National Register of Historic Places, as are New Kent County and Richmond properties where Richard Adams lived, though most were redeveloped. Of the sisters who married, Anne Adams married Col. Mayo Carrington of "Boston Hill" plantation in Cumberland County, who served in the Virginia legislature part-time, though she preferred to reside in Richmond. Sarah Adams married future Governor of Virginia George W. Smith. Alice Adams married lawyer William Marshall of Fauquier County, who was the Henrico County commonwealth attorney and would become the clerk of the U.S. District Court, and was the brother of U.S. Supreme Court Justice John Marshall.

This John Adams received a private education as befit his class (including during the years his father served as Richmond's mayor, 1786-1788), then went to Scotland for higher education. He graduated from the University of Edinburgh with a medical degree in 1796.

== Career ==
After returning to Virginia, Adams began his medical practice in Richmond as the partner of Dr. Cringan and later became a partner with Dr. Micajah Clarke – in both instances advertising services in the local newspapers.

Although he practiced medicine in Richmond all his life, Adams was also very active in business and politics, particularly since his elder brother, Richard Adams Jr., although he married twice and also lived in Richmond, had no children. On his father's death, Dr. Adams inherited ten lots on Church Hill, and continued to operate businesses that his father had started or invested in, including the Union Hotel, warehouses, docks and manufacturing establishments.

Richmond voters elected Dr. Adams to represent them in the Virginia House of Delegates in 1802, where he succeeded his brother-in-law George William Smith, and re-elected him once, before William DuVal succeeded him in 1804, Dr. Adams also served as mayor of Richmond from 1819 until his death in 1825. At the time of his death, Dr. John Adams was the longest-serving mayor in Richmond's history.

Adams was Richmond's mayor during one of the city's greatest civil and social events, the return of General Lafayette in 1825, and gave the welcoming address, saluting him as a "fellow citizen of Virginia and a brother by adoption." Parades, fireworks and festivities followed, culminating in a dinner – reportedly the greatest ever given in Richmond – which continued until 11 pm.

Notable, for the 1823 era, was Mayor Adams' endorsement of a petition by 91 free persons of colour and slaves to form a Baptist church, where they might worship together and take instruction in letters. The petition states:

The petition of a number of persons of colour residing in the City of Richmond, respectfully represents: that from the rapid increase of population in the City, the number of free persons of colour and slaves has become very considerable and although few of them can boast any knowledge of letters, yet that they are always desirous of receiving such instruction from public and divine worship as may be given by sensible and prudent Teachers of religion.

It has been the misfortune of your petitioners to be excluded from the churches, meeting-houses and other places of public devotion which are used by white persons in consequence of no appropriate places being assigned for them, except in a few Houses, and they have been compelled to look to private Houses, where they are much crowded and where a portion of their Brothers are unable to hear or to partake of the worship which is going on. Your Petitioners consisting of free persons and slaves, have been for some time associated with the Baptist church. A list of their members consisting of about 700 persons has been submitted for his inspection to the Head of Police of this City and no objection has been by him made to their moral characters.

Your Petitioners for these reasons humbly pray that your honourable body will pass a law authorizing them to cause to be erected within this city a house of public worship which may be called the Baptist African Church. To such restrictions and restraints as are consistent with the laws now existing or which may hereafter be passed for the proper restraint of persons of colour and for the preservation of the peace and good order of society ... our petitioners are prepared most cheerfully to submit, and although it would be pleasing to them to have a voice in the choice of their Teachers yet would they be quite satisfied that any choice made by them should be approved or rejected by the Mayor of this city, they ask not for the privilege of continuing in office any preacher who shall in any manner have rendered himself obnoxious to the Mayor, nor can they reasonably expect to hold night meetings of assemblages for Baptizing but with the consent of that office. And your Petitioners as in duty bound will ever pray...

Adams endorsed the petition:

I am of opinion that the prayers of their petition, if granted, may be productive of benefit to themselves as well as to the white population of Richmond and most sincerely wish them success.

John Adams

Mayor of the City of Richmond

The petitioned-for Baptist institution was launched and served until 1831. At that time, six years after Adams' death, the city fathers rescinded the earlier permission – fearful that teaching literacy would help spread the abolitionist movement. An Act of April 7, 1831, stated "all meetings of free negroes or mulattoes at any school-house or other place for teaching them reading or writing, either in the day or night, under whatever pretext" were declared to be unlawful assemblies. (A still stricter law banning assemblies of negroes for black-led religious worship was enacted in 1842.)

== Homes ==
After his father's death on August 1–2, 1800, and as sole inheritor of his father's properties in the city, Dr. Adams built several properties, as well as enlarged the family graveyard to a half acre. He built a mansion in 1802 at 2311 East Grace Street on Church Hill. Three years after the Panic of 1819, Adams lost both his home and hotel in the aftermath of bad loans made to others. John Van Lew (Liew) eventually acquired the house, and his daughter Elizabeth Van Lew would become its most famous occupant, and honored by a modern historical marker. The Yankee abolitionist, Union sympathizer and spymaster became Richmond's postmaster during the presidency of former U.S. General Grant Although socially ostracized as the city glorified is Confederate heritage, she also campaigned for women's rights. The Adams/Van Lew house was razed in 1911 and replaced by a public school that still stands (Bellevue Elementary School).

Dr. Adams also built a brick double house between 1809 and 1810 for rental purposes, at the southeast corner of Grace and 25th streets (2501 East Grace St). Another Adams house still remaining on Grace St is the home built by Dr. Adams for his sister Ann, who married Mayo Carrington. It was restored by the Association for the Preservation of Virginia Antiquities.

== Personal life ==
Dr. John Adams married Margaret Winston, daughter of Geddes Winston and Mary Jordan, in January, 1799. They had two sons and seven daughters, six of whom reached adulthood and married. John Adams Jr. married twice but had no children. His brother Richard Henry Adams married Anna Carter Harrison (sister of Mary Howell Harrison, who married Col. George William Hunt Minge, brother of David and Dr. John Minge). R.H. Adams and his brother in law David Minge both moved their families to Marengo County, Alabama between 1832 and 1835, where they became a wealthy cotton planters using enslaved labor. R.H. Adams eventually returned to Richmond, where he died, but he had also become a successful merchant in Selma, Alabama as well as built a now-historic home, Altwood, and held thousands of acres of land in Dallas, Marengo, Montgomery, Perry and Shelby Counties in that state, as well as shares in a railroad and lime kiln businesses. Of their sisters: Mary Griffin Adams married Dr. John Minge and her sister youngest sister Elvira married his brother David Minge; Eliza married U.S. Navy Capt. John Heron; Martha Winston married Burwell B. Moseley of Norfolk; Margaret married first Charles Pickett (and after his death her cousin Col. George Mayo Carrington); Louisa married her cousin Dr. Richard Adams Carrington; and Lavinia probably died in infancy.

== Death and legacy ==
Like his father, Dr. Adams died in his sleep at home, on the night of June 23 and 24, 1825. Richmond papers published obituaries. He outlived both his wives and six of his children. After a large funeral and masonic ceremony, he was buried in the family burying ground on Marshall St. near 23rd on Church Hill (which became the largest private cemetery in the city after the Civil War). Although the cemetery was redeveloped in 1892, his and other human remains were transferred to now-historic Hollywood Cemetery. The new family gravesite has a historic marker primarily honoring this man's father, with the coat of arms of the Adams family, but the reverse mentioning this man and other relatives reburied there.

The Church Hill Historic District includes the remaining Adams rental or family properties, as well as his father's former home, redeveloped after the Civil War into a Catholic convent, and now operating as the multi-denominational Richmond Hill spiritual community.

== Ancestry ==
In 1774-75, this boy's father Richard was a member of the Committee of Safety, and in 1775 was a member of the Virginia Convention. From 1776 to 1778 Adams was a member of the Virginia House of Delegates, and from 1778 to 1782 was a member of the Virginia Senate. He was also a member of the committee charged with removing the seat of government from Williamsburg to Richmond in 1779. He was said to be an ardent patriot and one of the most public spirited and influential citizens of Richmond.

By purchase and patent Richard Adams Sr became the largest property owner in Richmond, and that by 1787 he was listed among the one hundred largest property holders in the state of Virginia. His holdings included 10,865 acres of land in six counties, 108 slaves, 36 horses, 134 cattle, and two lots in Richmond. Half of this land was in the newly created county of Henry on the North Carolina border.

In addition to his land holdings, Richard had other business and commercial interests. His lumber business went up in flames caused by lightning in 1769. Only heroic measures by Adams and a friend prevented the fire from destroying the rest of the town.

Richard and his brother Thomas, four years his junior, were partners in a mercantile endeavor. While Thomas upheld the English end of the business from 1762 to 1774, Richard carried on the American end, which involved buying tobacco, securing outgoing cargo, and marketing incoming goods. Mrs. Griffith mentions “voluminous” Adams papers in the Virginia Historical Society which consist principally of business correspondence between the brothers.

Richard Adams offered property he owned on Richmond Hill to the state of Virginia for the erection of the State Capitol. The offer, a gift, was considered seriously but not accepted.

In 1769 Richard Adams bought ten lots on the summit of the hill overlooking Richmond. He probably built a house on some of the property and about 1788 replaced it with another just south of the former dwelling. The house was said to be "unique architecturally in Richmond, with four chimneys, several dormers, and a shingled roof.” When Richard Adams died in August 1800 and his wife Elizabeth died in December of the same year, their home was left to their son Richard, who survived all his children. Upon the death of this second Richard, in 1817, his estate, estimated to be worth $1,200,000, was divided among his nieces and nephews. After a few years the house passed out of the Adams family and eventually was acquired by the Sisters of the Academy of the Visitation of Monte Maria. The nuns operated a school for some years and after its discontinuance, a dormitory for the nuns was erected on the site.

Richard Adams served as mayor of Richmond (its sixth) from December 11, 1786 to February 21, 1788. Richard died on August 2, 1800.
