= 1811 Virginia gubernatorial election =

- December 5, 1811
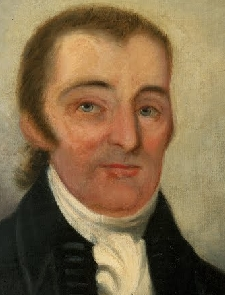

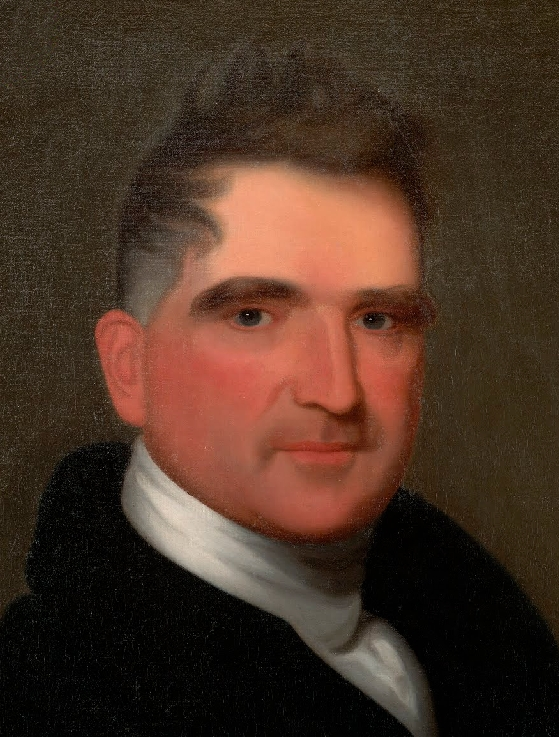
Nominee	George W. Smith	James Barbour
1st ballot	98	97
2nd ballot	100	97
Governor before election
George W. Smith (acting)
Democratic-Republican
Elected Governor
George W. Smith
Democratic-Republican (Note: Lampi lists no parties for this election. Kallenbach and Kallenbach list Smith as a Jeffersonian Republican during his tenure, while Sobel and Raimo do not indicate a party.)

A gubernatorial election was held in Virginia on December 5, 1811. The acting governor of Virginia George W. Smith defeated the speaker of the Virginia House of Delegates James Barbour.

The previous governor James Monroe resigned on April 3, 1811, to accept an appointment as U.S. secretary of state. Smith succeeded to office in his capacity as president of the Council of State and acted as governor for the remainder of the unexpired term. Barbour had been mentioned as a possible candidate in the preceding special election to succeed John Tyler Sr., but declined to challenge Monroe, who defeated Smith on the joint ballot. With Monroe's resignation, Barbour's allies now believed his election was assured.

The election was conducted by the Virginia General Assembly in joint session. No candidate had a majority after the first ballot, requiring a second round of voting. Smith was elected with a majority on the second ballot. Barbour was disheartened by the defeat and considered retiring from politics, but would shortly succeed Smith in the next election following the latter's death three weeks later.

== General election ==
1811 Virginia gubernatorial election
Candidate	First ballot		Second ballot	
Candidate	Count	Percent	Count	Percent
George W. Smith (incumbent)	98	50.00	100	50.76
James Barbour	97	49.49	97	49.24
Others	1	0.51	—N/a	
Total	196	100.00	197	100.00

== Bibliography ==
- Kallenbach, Joseph E.; Kallenbach, Jessamine S. (1977). American State Governors, 1776–1976. Vol. 1. Dobbs Ferry, NY: Oceana Publications.
- Lampi, Philip J. (2012a). "Virginia 1811 Governor, Special". A New Nation Votes. American Antiquarian Society.
- Lampi, Philip J. (2012b). "Virginia 1811 Governor, Special, Ballot 2". A New Nation Votes. American Antiquarian Society.
- Lowery, Charles D. (1984). James Barbour: A Jeffersonian Republican. University, AL: University of Alabama Press.
- Sobel, Robert; Raimo, John (1978). Biographical Directory of the Governors of the United States 1789–1978. Vol. 4. Westport, CT: Meckler Books.
- Virginia (n.d.). Journal of the House of Delegates [...]. Richmond.
