= 1812 Virginia gubernatorial special election =

- January 3, 1812
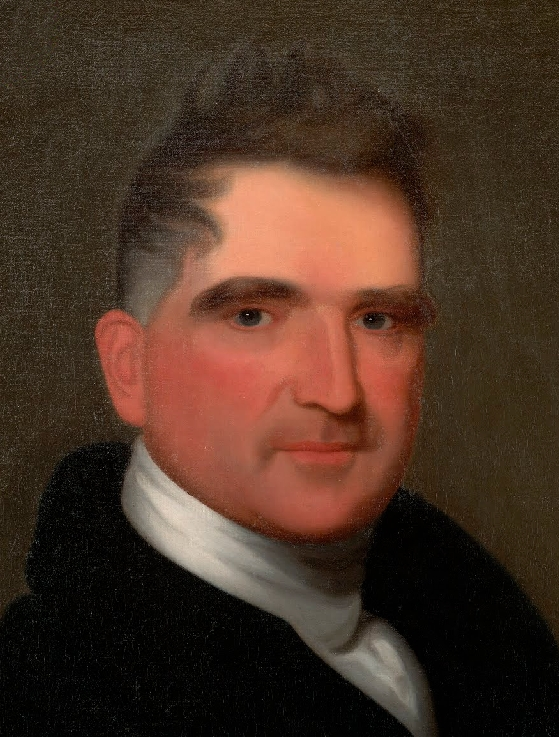
| Nominee | James Barbour |
Governor before election
Peyton Randolph (acting)
Democratic-Republican
Elected Governor
James Barbour
Democratic-Republican (Note: The Journal of the House of Delegates lists no parties for this election, while Lowery states Barbour ran as a "consensus candidate." Both Kallenbach and Kallenbach and Sobel and Raimo list Barbour as a Democratic-Republican during his tenure.)

A gubernatorial special election was held in Virginia on January 3, 1812. The speaker of the Virginia House of Delegates James Barbour was elected without opposition.

The previous governor of Virginia George W. Smith died on December 26, 1811. Peyton Randolph succeeded to office in his capacity as president of the Council of State and acted as governor until the election of a successor. Barbour had narrowly lost the preceding election to Smith and now emerged as the consensus candidate among the members of the legislature.

The election was conducted by the Virginia General Assembly in joint session. Barbour was elected with a majority on the first ballot.

== General election ==
1812 Virginia gubernatorial special election
| Candidate | First ballot | |
| Candidate | Count | Percent |
|---|---|---|
| James Barbour | ** | |
| Total | ** | 100.00 |

== Bibliography ==
- Kallenbach, Joseph E.; Kallenbach, Jessamine S. (1977). American State Governors, 1776–1976. Vol. 1. Dobbs Ferry, NY: Oceana Publications.
- Lowery, Charles D. (1984). James Barbour: A Jeffersonian Republican. University, AL: University of Alabama Press.
- Sobel, Robert; Raimo, John (1978). Biographical Directory of the Governors of the United States 1789–1978. Vol. 4. Westport, CT: Meckler Books.
- Virginia (n.d.). Journal of the House of Delegates [...]. Richmond.
