= Francis Smith (burgess) =

Virginia burgess

Member of the Virginia House of Burgesses from Essex County
- In office 1752-1758
- Preceded by: James Garnett
- Succeeded by: Francis Waring

Personal details
- Died: Essex County, Virginia
- Spouse(s): Lucy Meriwether, Ann Adams
- Children: Meriwether Smith, Francis Smith, William Smith and at least 3 daughters
- Occupation: farmer, politician

Francis Smith (died 1762) was an planter, merchant, militia officer and burgess who represented Essex County in the House of Burgesses 1752-1755.

== Early life ==
Accounts differ as to his parentage. According to Lyon Gardiner Tyler, his father was Nicholas Smith of Petsworth Parish in Gloucester County (although another much wealthier man of the same name would become burgess for King George County and developed "Smith's Mount" plantation in Westmoreland County on the Northern Neck of Virginia but had only daughters). Others believe his father was John Smith, because of a deed recorded in Essex County in 1722.

== Career ==
Although Francis Smith was promoted from major to colonel of the county's horse militia and was a vestryman of South Farnham parish as well as served a justice of the peace for Essex County since 1740, today he may be best known as the father of Meriwether Smith. Francis Smith built "Bathurst" plantation on the southside of Piscataway Creek approximately two-thirds of a mile from its confluence with the Rappahannock River, on land Francis Meriwether had occupied in the 1690s.

Essex County voters elected him as one of their representatives in the House of Burgesses, and re-elected him once, although his co-burgesses differed in those terms.

== Personal life ==
Smith first married Lucy Meriwether (the daughter of burgess and Essex County clerk Francis Meriwether and his wife Mary Bathurst. The name of their firstborn son, Meriwether Smith, reflects that grandfather, and the plantation's name reflects that grandmother. The marriage also produced two daughters who reached adulthood and married: Mary married James Webb Jr. and bore a son Francis Webb (who was mentioned in this man's will), Elizabeth married William Young (who also served as a South Farnham parish vestryman and on the Essex Committee of Safety 1774-1775. Although the date Lucy died is now unknown, about 1747-1748, Smith married Anne Adams (1731-1775), the daughter of merchant Ebenezer Adams, and whose brothers Richard and Thomas would become a prominent patriots. They had a daughter, Anne, and sons Francis Jr. (1749- circa 1814, who married Lucy Wilkinson and later moved to Wilkes County, Georgia where he died with many children and considerable property) and William (who married Mary Belfield and served in the legislature for one term in 1778, then bought land from his departing brother but died in 1783).

== Death and legacy ==
His will, accepted into probate on March 15, 1762, names his widow as executrix and son Meriwether and friend Thomas Adams as executors, with other sons Francis Smith and William Smith also receiving many named slaves and other property.

Bathurst was decrepit and torn down in the 20th century, but a photograph of outbuildings survives in the Erol Briggs Collection of the Virginia Department of Historic Resources.
