= Meriwether Smith =

American politician (1730–1790)

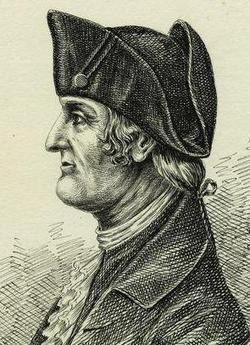

Delegate from Virginia to the Continental Congress
- In office 1778–1780

Delegate to the Congress of the Confederation from Virginia
- In office 1781

Member of the Virginia House of Delegates from Essex County
- In office October 17, 1785 – December 19, 1788 Serving with William Gatewood, James Upshaw Jr.
- Preceded by: Spencer Roane
- Succeeded by: Richard Banks
- In office May 7, 1781 – 1782 Serving with Newman Brockenbrough
- Preceded by: William Gatewood
- Succeeded by: Spencer Roane
- In office October 7, 1776 – May 4, 1777 Serving with James Edmundson
- Preceded by: position created
- Succeeded by: William Smith

Member of the House of Burgesses from Essex County
- In office 1775 – July 1776 Serving with James Edmundson
- Preceded by: William Roane
- Succeeded by: position eliminated

Personal details
- Born: 1730 Essex County, Colony of Virginia, British America
- Died: January 25, 1730 (aged 90) Essex County, Virginia
- Children: George W. Smith
- Profession: planter, politician

Meriwether Smith (1730 – January 25, 1790) was a Virginia merchant, planter and politician from Essex County, Virginia. Although he represented Essex County in the House of Burgesses, all five Virginia Revolutionary Conventions, the Virginia House of Delegates and the Virginia Ratifying Convention, he may be best known for representing Virginia in the Confederation Congress and the Continental Congress.

== Early and family life ==
Born at "Bathurst" plantation in Essex County, where he would live his entire life, his father was Colonel (and sometime burgess) Francis Smith. His mother, Lucy Meriwether, was the daughter of Francis Meriwether, who was born in Surry County, but settled in Essex County circa 1690, and became its first clerk as the area developed after Bacon's Rebellion. Francis Meriwether's wife (this man's maternal grandmother) was Lady Mary Bathurst, and after his death she would remarry to powerful Speaker John Robinson. Her father, Lancelot Bathurst, was sheriff of nearby New Kent County and son of Sir Edwin Bathurst whose estate had been sequestered in during the Cromwell era, and whose name this man would honor in one of his sons.

The paternal Smith ancestors held many local political offices in Essex county, though less clear is his descent from Toby Smith who was burgess for Warwick River County in 1642, then held the same roles for Lower Norfolk County and Nansemond County before in 1657 acquiring 1350 acres on the south side of the Rappahannock near Piscataway Creek which he developed into a plantation called "Rockingham" in what became Lancaster County when it was formed a decade later and later became Essex County. Col. Francis Smith's father and grandfather were both named Nicholas. The Bathurst plantation house of eight rooms split among two storeys was built circa 1740 about 2/3s of a mile from the mouth of Piscataway Creek about two miles from Tappahannock, the county seat. Tappahannock had circa 1680 been known as "Hobb's His Hole Harbor", named after an early patentee of the area where Tickner Creek met the Rappahannock River.

== Career ==
Smith operated Bathurst as a plantation using enslaved labor. When it was offered for sale in 1793, not long after his death, it included about 700 acres, the manor house, and a granery on the bank of the Piscataway River so that vessels could receive their load within 15 or 20 feet of the door. Smith and Tappahannock merchant Archibald Ritchie also invested heavily in thoroughbred racehorses, including importing "David" and "Bucephalus" from England in 1764. Although everyone was welcome at the actual races, only gentlemen could participate, both by social custom and because of the enormous gambling bets permitted.

Ritchie was the wealthiest man in the county in the winter of 1765/6, but also hated because of his arrogance toward his neighbors and customers. He prompted a crisis over the 1765 Stamp Act. Not long after the new year Ritchie announced he planned to send a ship from Hobb's Hole to the West Indies in February after paying for the stamps, despite most neighbors vowing to boycott the new tax. Burgesses Francis Waring and William Roane confronted Ritchie on court day at Tappahannock, and Ritchie signed a pledge not to use the stamps. Nonetheless, many neighbors remained dissatisfied. Richard Henry Lee and Samuel Washington gathered men from nine counties in the Rappahannock River valley (the Piscataway being a tributary of that river), who met at Leedstown on February 27, 1766. Smith joined the other signatories of the articles of the Westmoreland Association, as very reluctantly did Ritchie. Nonetheless many people remained concerned because the county prosecutor, Archibald McCall (also the town's second-wealthiest merchant), also supported the Stamp Act. This led to a riot on May 6, 1766, but the unrest subsided upon learning of the repeal of the Stamp Act. Both Ritchie and McCall signed the nonimportation agreement in 1770, as did Smith and George Washington. Nonetheless, a kerfuffle ensued when a load of British goods arrived for Muscoe Garnett, Ritchie and Smith in early 1771, which was ultimately allowed when Smith and Ritchie proved they had ordered the goods before signing the nonimportation pact.

Essex County voters first elected Smith to the Virginia House of Burgesses in 1775. He had vocally opposed the Stamp Act and served alongside fellow former burgesses James Edmondson (and once also with his predecessor William Roane) as Essex County's representatives in the five Virginia revolutionary conventions that replaced the prorogued burgesses in 1775 and 1776. Smith soon was considered one of the best speakers in the body, and helped author a bill of rights for the new state and its constitution.

Fellow legislators elected him as a delegate to the Continental Congress in 1778, 1779, and 1780, although he did not serve during the 1779 term. Meanwhile, Smith won election to the first term of the Virginia House of Delegates in 1776, then after a gap, again won election again in 1778, but did not serve that year because legislators elected him as one of the Commonwealth's representatives to the Continental Congress (being replaced by William Roane). In 1778, Smith again represented Essex County for little more than a term, as legislators elected him to the Council of State. Essex County voters again elected him as one of their delegates in 1781, and he served for a term alongside William Gatewood, then thrice alongside James Upshaw Jr.

In 1788 Smith won his final statewide election, and so with Spencer Roane represented Essex County during the Virginia convention that ratified the U.S. Constitution. An Anti-Federalist, he voted against ratification. He twice unsuccessfully ran for Virginia's 7th congressional district in 1789, finishing 3rd, and in 1790.

== Personal life ==
Smith married twice. In 1760, he married the widow Alice Lee Clark, who was the daughter of Philip Corbin Lee (of the Lee Family, one of the First Families of Virginia though he lived in and represented Prince George's County, Maryland). She already had a daughter Margaret Lee (but nicknamed "Alice") by her first husband Thomas Clarke. Thus, Smith's step daughter eventually married Continental Congressman and Maryland Chancellor John Rogers. Meriwether and Alice had one son, George William Smith, who became a planter and politician like his father and later briefly served as Governor of Virginia. After Alice died, Smith married Elizabeth Daingerfield in 1769. Their son Edwin Bathurst Smith (1775-1844) later moved to Illinois.

== Death and legacy ==
Meriwether Smith died at "Marigold" plantation, also in Essex County in January 1790, and was buried in a family plot on his plantation, "Bathurst," as would be his widow. His son George William Smith inherited Bathurst, but died in the great Richmond theater fire, so Thomas Jones of Hanover County bought the property, which he later bequeathed to his son Thomas Jones, who sold it in 1812 to Lawrence Muse for English bonds worth 4000pounds sterling. Judge Beverley Tucker's novel "George Balcombe" (1836) was said to be inspired by Bathurst plantation. The Bathurst property still existed in the 20th century, but when a purchaser attempted to move the structure to Albemarle County, it was determined too decrepit to move and so demolished; only two crumbling chimneys remained of the historic house by mid-century.
