= Governor Randolph =

Governor Randolph may refer to:

- Beverley Randolph (1754–1797), 8th Governor of Virginia
- Edmund Randolph (1753–1813), 7th Governor of Virginia
- Peyton Randolph (governor) (1779–1828), Acting Governor of Virginia from 1811 to 1812
- Theodore Fitz Randolph (1826–1883), 22nd Governor of New Jersey
- Thomas Mann Randolph Jr. (1768–1828), 21st Governor of Virginia
