= Thomas Adams (politician) =

American Founding Father and politician

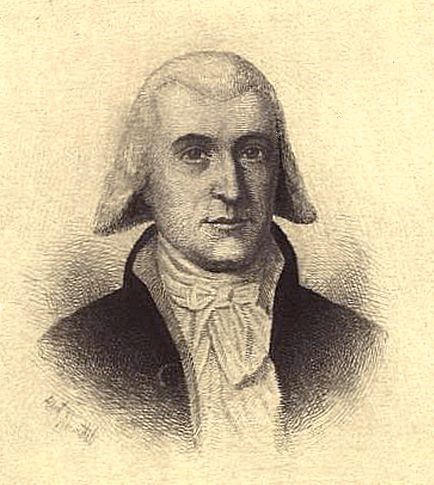
- Thomas Adams, signatory to the Articles of Confederation
- Born: c. 1730; New Kent County, Virginia Colony, British America
- Died: August or October, 1788; Deerfield, Augusta County, Virginia, U.S.
- Occupations: politician, businessman
- Known for: Signer of both the Virginia Association and the Articles of Confederation
- Spouse: Elizabeth (Fauntleroy) Cocke
- Children: none
- Parents: Ebenezer Adams (father); Tabitha Cocke (mother)
- Relatives: Richard Adams(brother); John Adams (Nephew)

Delegate from Virginia to the Continental Congress
- In office 1778–1780

Member of the Virginia State Senate
- In office May 5, 1783 – October 15, 1786
- Preceded by: Sampson Mathews
- Succeeded by: Alexander St. Clair

Thomas Adams (1730– August 1788) was a patriot, politician and businessman from Virginia. A Founding Father of the United States, he was a Virginia delegate in the Continental Congress and signed the Articles of Confederation.

== Early years ==
Adams was born circa 1730, probably near Cumberland Town in New Kent County, Virginia, the youngest of five sons (and sixth of eight children) of Ebenezer Adams and his wife, the former Tabitha Cocke. His father was born in London, England, settled in Virginia before 1714 and became a merchant and planter in the colony, receiving land grants in New Kent County and neighboring Henrico County. His mother was from one of the First Families of Virginia, the daughter of merchant Richard Cocke (1673-circa 1720) of Bremo plantation in Henrico County and his first wife Ann Bowler (1674-1705). Her uncle Bowler Cocke (1696-1771) was the Henrico county clerk and member of the House of Burgesses (1752–65, after marrying Elizabeth Hill Carter, the daughter of former Speaker Edward Hill of downstream Charles City County and widow of John Carter of Corotoman plantation in Lancaster County). Her sister Anne married Capt. William Acrill of Charles City County, whose son also William Acrill (d. 1783) served as a burgess, member of all five revolutionary conventions and in the House of Delegates. However, the first three sons of Ebenzer and Tabitha Adams died as children, so only his brother Richard Adams (1726-1800) and three sisters reached adulthood and married. Like his elder brother, Adams received an education appropriate to his class.

== Career ==
Coat of Arms of Thomas Adams

Probably through the influence of his uncle Bowler Cocke, Adams was appointed as clerk of Henrico County in 1753 and served until 1778 or 1778 (presumably because of his absences discussed below, many of the duties were performed by Bowler Cocke Jr. who barely survived his long-lived father). Adams also served as a justice of peace for New Kent County for many years (but was removed because of multiple long absences in February 1773). Like his brother, Adams served as vestryman of Henrico parish (in his case, from December 1757 til 1761).

This Adams family had extensive business interests in England, and while his brother Richard Adams directed its Virginia interests from the relatively new town of Richmond in Henrico County (in which he would become active, including becoming the sixth mayor as well as serving in the Virginia General Assembly before and after the American Revolution), this man lived in England from 1762 to around 1774. In 1772, burgess Patrick Henry proposed this man succeed Edward Montague as the colony's agent in England, but the burgesses could not agree on whether to reappoint Montague, or appoint either this man or Arthur Lee (of another of the First Families of Virginia), so the position remained vacant for a while. While in England, Adams persuaded the Florentine merchant Philip Mazzei to emigrate to the Virginia colony, and Mazzei would later serve as Virginia's agent in Europe.

In 1774, Adams sailed back to Virginia, shortly before the outbreak of the American Revolution. He became chairman of the New Kent County Committee of Safety and on May 27, 1774 signed the Virginia Association entered into by the House of Burgesses. Members of the successor Virginia House of Delegates elected Adams to the Council of State (the government's small executive branch) in 1777, but he was disqualified because he held another office (as Henrico clerk). The legislature in April 1778 chose Adams as one of Virginia's delegates to the Continental Congress, succeeding Joseph Jones of Brunswick County, and as discussed below Adams also served in 1779. At that time during the American Revolutionary War, the Continental Congress met in York, Pennsylvania (north of the Shenandoah Valley and Adams lived southwest of it and Jones lived to the southeast). Adams served on the Committees on Commerce, Marine Affairs and Indian Affairs, and became known for defending Silas Deane, the American Commissioner to France, against (ultimately successful) attempts of the Lee family to discredit Deane. In May 1778, Adams received the most legislative votes of any Virginian to serve in the Continental Congress, and he signed the Articles of Confederation on July 9, 1778 as head of the state's delegation. While Adams returned to Virginia from August 1778 until January 1779, he returned to the Continental Congress and served until resigning for personal reasons on April 28, 1779.

== Later years ==
Adams had invested in real estate in western Virginia, and developed a plantation or store on the Calfpasture River (a tributary of the Maury River which drains into the uppermost portion of the James River which formed the southern border of both New Kent and Henrico Counties) in then-vast Augusta County. By the 1780s, he owned over 2000 acres in Augusta, Amherst and Buckingham Counties (all bordering the James River upstream of its fall line at which Richmond had been constructed), as well as several thousands of acres in the Ohio Valley west of the Appalachian mountains. In 1782 Adams was the largest slaveholder in what became Bath County shortly after his death, paying taxes on 40 slaves (of the 101 in that district) as well as 13 horses, 43 cattle and a chariot; the next largest slaveowner Sampson Mathews owning 14 slaves and Moore Fauntleroy owning 11 slaves. Adams owned 37 enslaved persons at his death (valued at nearly 2,000 pound sterling) and other personal property worth 800 pounds sterling. As discussed below, Adams manumitted one enslaved man, Joseph, in his last will and testament.

Despite his multiple travels, Adams became one of the justices of the peace who jointly governed Augusta county in that era (in addition to handling minor judicial matter), and fellow justices had elected him as their presiding justice on March 24, 1778, but Adams did not take the oath of office until March 21, 1780 and would be removed on June 13, 1786 due to frequent absences. Adams also owned land in several counties formed from Augusta County, and a possibly distant relative Col. Thomas Miller Adams had land in what had become Shenandoah County near Front Royal (which would be founded a decade later through his efforts and those of the son of General William Russell, among others). Meanwhile, in 1783, voters from the Shenandoah Valley counties of Augusta, Rockingham, Rockbridge, and Shenandoah elected Adams to the Virginia State Senate, where he succeeded Indian fighter and real estate speculator Sampson Mathews and served from 1783 to 1787.

== Personal life ==
In 1775 Adams married the widow Elizabeth (Fauntleroy) Cocke, widow of his cousin and Henrico county clerk, Bowler Cocke Jr. (1726-1772), but the couple had no children who survived.

== Death and legacy ==
Adams wrote his last will and testament on October 14, 1785 as he was about to embark on a journey from the Calfpasture River valley (which in 1782 was in Augusta County, but which in 1790 became in Bath County and part later in Highland County) to the Ohio River. In August 1788, Adams died in Augusta County, either in what is now Deerfield, or on his estate, "Cowpasture". Other sources report that he died in October 1788, which is when his will was presented to the Augusta County probate court.

His handwritten last will and testament accepted by the probate court provided for his widow, gave his friend John Blair his former lands in Albemarle County and Ralph Wanlass the house and plantation where he was living, with other lands and slaves bequeathed to his nephews "Subject to the payment of my Debts in Exoneration of my Slaves." Adams bequeathed one enslaved man (Cooper Lemon) to his niece Tabitha Epps, and expressly directed that his executors (Thomas Massie, then of Frederick County, who had married his wife's daughter Sarah Cocke, and his nephews William Adams and William Adams Fry) manumit one enslaved man "as there is no man to whom I consider myself under greater obligations than to my slave, Joe," as well as "treat [other enslaved persons] he owned with that kindness and humanity to which they have been Accustomed and not sell or barter them away as cattle". His brother had become important in the new capital city, Richmond where he also helped found Richmond Hill, again a faith community in the capital, His nephew John also became a mayor of Richmond.

In March 1792, John Marshall, then an attorney in private practice, wrote the executor a (paid) legal opinion concerning the will, especially about the exoneration of slaves and payment of debts. That opinion, which allowed the Ms. Epps to immediately receive Lemon, but recommended either hiring out the remaining slaves or letting them work the lands, is now in the Massie Family Papers of the Virginia Historical Society,

== Sources ==
- United States Congress. "Thomas Adams (id: A000049)". Biographical Directory of the United States Congress.

Attribution
