= 1811 Virginia gubernatorial special election =

- January 16, 1811
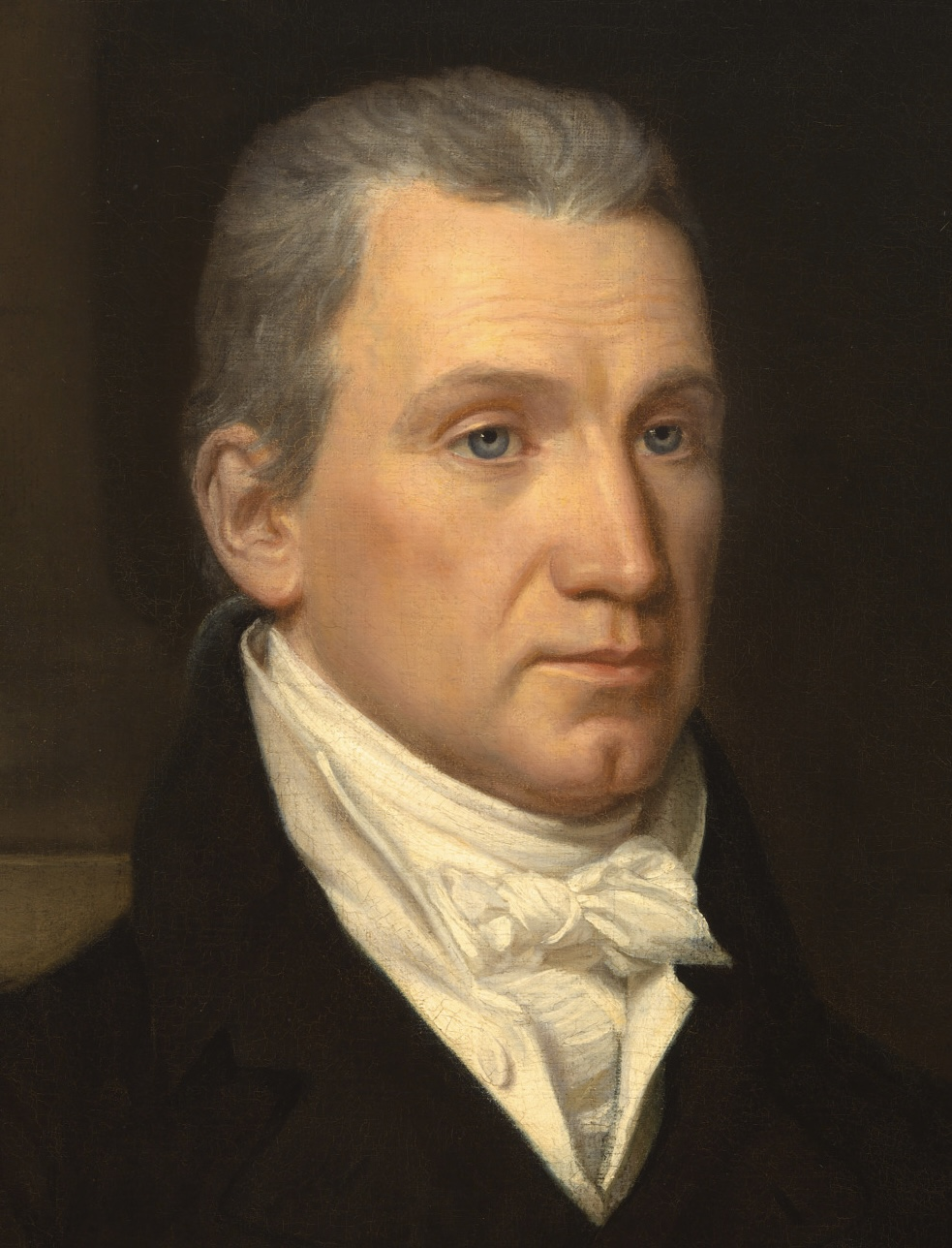

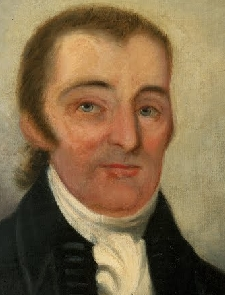
Nominee	James Monroe	George W. Smith
Party	Democratic-Republican
1st ballot	129	58
Governor before election
George W. Smith (acting)
Democratic-Republican (Note: Kallenbach and Kallenbach list Smith as a Jeffersonian Republican, while Sobel and Raimo do not indicate a party.)
Elected Governor
James Monroe
Democratic-Republican

A gubernatorial special election was held in Virginia on January 16, 1811. The Democratic-Republican member of the Virginia House of Delegates from Charlottesville James Monroe defeated the acting governor of Virginia George W. Smith.

The previous governor John Tyler Sr. resigned on January 15, 1811, to accept an appointment as judge of the United States District Court for the District of Virginia. Monroe had previously served as governor from 1799 to 1802 and later as U.S. minister to Great Britain. Upon his return to the United States in 1807, he emerged as a leader of the Tertium quids Political faction and a rival to the U.S. secretary of state James Madison for leadership of the Democratic-Republican Party. His return to the legislature in 1810 and subsequent bid for governor was part of a strategy to reingratiate himself with Virginia Democratic-Republicans following his unsuccessful challenge to Madison in the 1808 United States presidential election. Leaders of the Richmond Junto were initially skeptical of Monroe's candidacy, preferring to nominate the speaker of the Virginia House of Delegates James Barbour. In a letter to John Taylor of Caroline, subsequently circulated to the members of the legislature, Monroe affirmed his loyalty to Madison's administration while reserving the right to dissent with regard to specific policies. While this statement was less than the Junto leaders had sought, it was enough to alleviate most of their concerns.

The election was conducted by the Virginia General Assembly in joint session. Monroe was elected with a majority on the first ballot.

== General election ==
1811 Virginia gubernatorial special election
Party	Candidate	First ballot	
Party	Candidate	Count	Percent
Democratic-Republican	James Monroe	129	65.48
—N/a	George W. Smith	58	29.44
Others		10	5.08
Total		197	100.00

== Bibliography ==
- Ammon, Harry (1971). James Monroe: The Quest for National Identity. New York: McGraw Hill Book Company.
- Kallenbach, Joseph E.; Kallenbach, Jessamine S. (1977). American State Governors, 1776–1976. Vol. 1. Dobbs Ferry, NY: Oceana Publications.
- Lampi, Philip J. (2012). "Virginia 1811 Governor, Special". A New Nation Votes. American Antiquarian Society.
- Sobel, Robert; Raimo, John (1978). Biographical Directory of the Governors of the United States 1789–1978. Vol. 4. Westport, CT: Meckler Books.
- Virginia (n.d.). Journal of the House of Delegates [...]. Richmond.
