= Deerfield School (Deerfield, Virginia) =

- U.S. National Register of Historic Places
- Virginia Landmarks Register
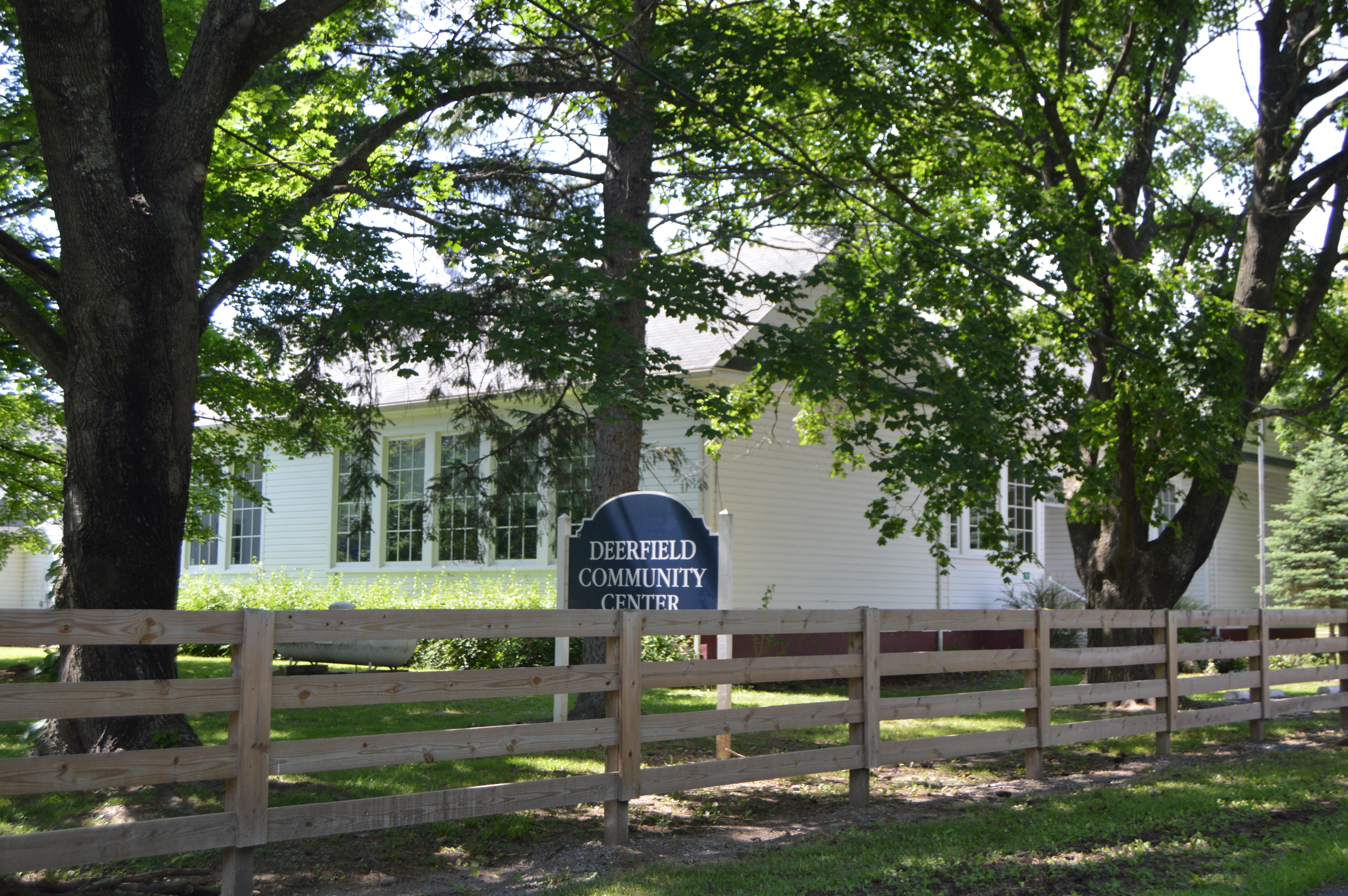
- Front and southern end of the school

- Location within Virginia Location within the United States
- Location: Marble Valley Road at Deerfield, Virginia
- Coordinates: 38°11′40″N 79°24′22″W
- Area: 2 acres (0.81 ha)
- Built: 1937, 1948-49, 1979
- Built by: Kellis Bibb and G.G. Shaver
- MPS: Public Schools in Augusta County Virginia 1870--1940 TR
- NRHP reference No.: 86001402
- VLR No.: 007-1154

Significant dates
- Added to NRHP: June 19, 1986
- Designated VLR: December 11, 1984

Deerfield School is a historic public school building located at Deerfield, Augusta County, Virginia, built in 1937. It was one of the last of the central-auditorium plan schools built in Augusta County. Originally it served students in all grades through high school, but the high-school students were transferred to Buffalo Gap High School in the early 1960s. It remained in use as an elementary school through at least 1984, but now serves as a community center.

It was listed on the National Register of Historic Places in 1986.

== History and description ==
Augusta County had begun consolidating one- and two-room schools into larger facilities in the 1900s and a four-room building was built in 1904 to teach elementary grades and some high school students in the remote Deerfield Valley. After it burnt down, the present school was built in 1937 on the same site. This classically based schoolhouse design was used widely in Virginia in the early twentieth century, although the design was modified by county employees to use framing rather than a brick veneer. "The school was one of the last such buildings constructed in the county. The structure is a one-story, central-auditorium plan, frame building with projecting classroom wings on each side of a recessed auditorium. A cinder-block cafeteria / kitchen addition was built in 1948–1949, and a cinder-block gymnasium / play room was added in 1979."

"The exterior lacks distinct attributes of any particular style such as the Colonial Revival styles that had characterized the circa-1930 schools. The transom-lighted entrance is slightly recessed between groups of three 6-over-6 sash windows. The facades of the wings are also quite plain, pierced only by square vents in the gables. Clusters of five 6-over-6 sash identify the classrooms on each side. The building rests on a concrete foundation and has a boiler room in the partial, but not exposed, basement."
