= President of the Continental Congress =

Presiding officer of the U.S. Continental Congress

President of the United States in Congress Assembled
- Seal of the president of the Congress
- Continental Congress
- Style: Mr. President (informal); The Honorable (formal)
- Status: Presiding officer
- Appointer: Vote within the Congress
- Formation: September 5, 1774
- First holder: Peyton Randolph
- Final holder: Cyrus Griffin
- Abolished: November 2, 1788

The president of the United States in Congress Assembled, known unofficially as the president of the Continental Congress and later as president of the Congress of the Confederation, was the presiding officer of the Continental Congress, the convention of delegates that assembled in Philadelphia as the first transitional national government of the United States during the American Revolution. The president was a member of Congress elected by the other delegates to serve as a neutral discussion moderator during meetings of Congress. Designed to be a largely ceremonial position without much influence, the office was unrelated to the later office of President of the United States.

Upon the ratification of the Articles of Confederation and Perpetual Union, which served as the new first constitution of the U.S. in March 1781, the Continental Congress became the Congress of the Confederation, and membership from the Second Continental Congress, along with its president, carried over without interruption to the First Congress of the Confederation.

Fourteen men served as president of Congress between September 1774 and November 1788. They came from nine of the original 13 states: Virginia (3), Massachusetts (2), Pennsylvania (2), South Carolina (2), Connecticut, (1), Delaware (1), Maryland (1), New Jersey (1), and New York (1).

== Role ==
By design, the president of the Continental Congress was a position with limited authority. The Continental Congress, fearful of concentrating political power in an individual, gave their presiding officer even less responsibility than the speakers in the lower houses of the colonial assemblies. Unlike some colonial speakers, the president of Congress could not, for example, set the legislative agenda or make committee appointments. The president could not meet privately with foreign leaders; such meetings were held with committees or the entire Congress.

The presidency was a largely ceremonial position. There was no salary. The primary role of the office was to preside over meetings of Congress, which entailed serving as an impartial moderator during debates. When Congress would resolve itself into a Committee of the Whole to discuss important matters, the president would relinquish his chair to the chairman of the Committee of the Whole. Even so, the fact that President Thomas McKean was at the same time serving as Chief Justice of Pennsylvania, provoked some criticism that he had become too powerful. According to historian Jennings Sanders, McKean's critics were ignorant of the powerlessness of the office of president of Congress.

The president was also responsible for dealing with a large amount of official correspondence, but he could not answer any letter without being instructed to do so by Congress. Presidents also signed, but did not write, Congress's official documents. These limitations could be frustrating, because a delegate essentially declined in influence when he was elected president.

Historian Richard B. Morris argued that, despite the ceremonial role, some presidents were able to wield some influence:

Lacking specific authorization or clear guidelines, the presidents of Congress could with some discretion influence events, formulate the agenda of Congress, and prodded Congress to move in directions they considered proper. Much depended on the incumbents themselves and their readiness to exploit the peculiar opportunities their office provided.

Congress, and its presidency, declined in importance after the ratification of the Articles of Confederation and the ending of the Revolutionary War. Increasingly, delegates elected to the Congress declined to serve, the leading men in each state preferred to serve in state government, and the Congress had difficulty establishing a quorum. President John Hanson wanted to resign after only a week in office, but Congress lacked a quorum to select a successor, and so he stayed on. President Thomas Mifflin found it difficult to convince the states to send enough delegates to Congress to ratify the 1783 Treaty of Paris. For six weeks in 1784, President Richard Henry Lee did not come to Congress, but instead instructed secretary Charles Thomson to forward any papers that needed his signature.

John Hancock was elected to a second term in November 1785, even though he was not then in Congress, and Congress was aware that he was unlikely to attend. He never took his seat, citing poor health, though he may have been uninterested in the position. Two delegates, David Ramsay and Nathaniel Gorham, performed his duties with the title of "chairman". When Hancock finally resigned the office in June 1786, Gorham was elected. After he resigned in November 1786, it was months before enough members were present in Congress to elect a new president. In February 1787, General Arthur St. Clair was elected. Congress passed the Northwest Ordinance during St. Clair's presidency and elected him as the governor of the Northwest Territory.

As the people of the various states began debating the proposed United States Constitution in later months of 1787, the Confederation Congress found itself reduced to the status of a caretaker government. There were not enough delegates present to choose St. Clair's successor until January 22, 1788, when the final president of Congress, Cyrus Griffin, was elected. Griffin resigned his office on November 15, 1788, after only two delegates showed up for the new session of Congress.

== Term of office ==
Prior to ratification of the Articles, presidents of Congress served terms of no specific duration; their tenure ended when they resigned, or, lacking an official resignation, when Congress selected a successor. When Peyton Randolph, who was elected in September 1774 to preside over the First Continental Congress, was unable to attend the last few days of the session due to poor health, Henry Middleton was elected to replace him. When the Second Continental Congress convened the following May, Randolph was again chosen as president, but he returned to Virginia two weeks later to preside over the House of Burgesses. John Hancock was elected to fill the vacancy, but his position was somewhat ambiguous because it was not clear if Randolph had resigned or was on a leave of absence. The situation became uncomfortable when Randolph returned to Congress in September 1775. Some delegates thought Hancock should have stepped down, but he did not; the matter was resolved only by Randolph's sudden death that October.

Ambiguity also clouded the end of Hancock's term. He left in October 1777 for what he believed was an extended leave of absence, only to find upon his return that Congress had elected Henry Laurens to replace him. Hancock, whose term ran from May 24, 1775 to October 29, 1777 (a period of 2 years, 5 months), was the longest serving president of Congress.

The length of a presidential term was ultimately codified by Article Nine of the Articles of Confederation, which authorized Congress "to appoint one of their number to preside; provided that no person be allowed to serve in the office of president more than one year in any term of three years". When the Articles went into effect in March 1781, however, the Continental Congress did not hold an election for a new president under the new constitution. Instead, Samuel Huntington continued serving a term that had already exceeded the new term limit. The first president to serve the specified one-year term was John Hanson (November 5, 1781 to November 4, 1782).

== List of presidents ==
Terms and backgrounds of the 14 men who served as president of the Continental Congress:

Portrait	Name	State/colony	Term	Length	Previous position
Peyton Randolph	Peyton Randolph (1721–1775)	Virginia	September 5, 1774 – October 22, 1774	47 days	Speaker of the Virginia House of Burgesses
Henry Middleton	Henry Middleton (1717–1784)	South Carolina	October 22, 1774 – October 26, 1774	4 days	Speaker, S.C. Commons House of Assembly
Peyton Randolph	Peyton Randolph (1721–1775)	Virginia	May 10, 1775 – May 24, 1775	14 days	Speaker of the Virginia House of Burgesses
John Hancock	John Hancock (1737–1793)	Massachusetts	May 24, 1775 – October 29, 1777	2 years, 158 days	President, Massachusetts Provincial Congress
Henry Laurens	Henry Laurens (1724–1792)	South Carolina	November 1, 1777 – December 9, 1778	1 year, 38 days	President, S.C. Provincial Congress, Vice President, S.C.
John Jay	John Jay (1745–1829)	New York	December 10, 1778 – September 28, 1779	292 days	Chief Justice New York Supreme Court
Samuel Huntington	Samuel Huntington (1731–1796)	Connecticut	September 28, 1779 – July 10, 1781	1 year, 285 days	Associate Judge, Connecticut Superior Court
Thomas McKean	Thomas McKean (1734–1817)	Delaware	July 10, 1781 – November 5, 1781	118 days	Chief Justice of the Pennsylvania Supreme Court
John Hanson	John Hanson (1721–1783)	Maryland	November 5, 1781 – November 4, 1782	364 days	Maryland House of Delegates
Elias Boudinot	Elias Boudinot (1740–1821)	New Jersey	November 4, 1782 – November 3, 1783	364 days	Commissary of Prisoners for the Continental Army
Thomas Mifflin	Thomas Mifflin (1744–1800)	Pennsylvania	November 3, 1783 – June 3, 1784	213 days	Quartermaster General of Continental Army, Board of War
Richard Henry Lee	Richard Henry Lee (1732–1794)	Virginia	November 30, 1784 – November 4, 1785	339 days	Virginia House of Burgesses
John Hancock	John Hancock (1737–1793)	Massachusetts	November 23, 1785 – June 5, 1786	194 days	Governor of Massachusetts
Nathaniel Gorham	Nathaniel Gorham (1738–1796)	Massachusetts	June 6, 1786 – February 2, 1787	241 days	Board of War
Arthur St. Clair	Arthur St. Clair (1737–1818)	Pennsylvania	February 2, 1787 – November 4, 1787	275 days	Major General, Continental Army
Cyrus Griffin	Cyrus Griffin (1748–1810)	Virginia	January 22, 1788 – November 2, 1788	298 days	Judge, Virginia Court of Appeals

== Relationship to the president of the United States ==
Beyond a similarity of title, the office of President of Congress "bore no relationship" to the later office of President of the United States. As historian Edmund Burnett wrote:

The president of the United States is scarcely in any sense the successor of the presidents of the old Congress. The presidents of Congress were almost solely presiding officers, possessing scarcely a shred of executive or administrative functions; whereas the president of the United States is almost solely an executive officer, with no presiding duties at all. Barring a likeness in social and diplomatic precedence, the two offices are identical only in the possession of the same title.

Nonetheless, the presidents of the Continental Congress and the presidents of the United States in Congress Assembled are sometimes claimed to have been president before George Washington as if the offices were equivalent. The continuous nature of the Continental Congresses and Congress under the Articles also allows for multiple claims of being the "first president of the United States." This would include Peyton Randolph as president of the First Continental Congress, John Hancock as president when the Declaration of Independence was signed, Samuel Huntington as president when the Articles were ratified and took effect, Thomas McKean as the first president elected under the Articles, and John Hanson as the first president under the Articles to serve the prescribed one-year term. Hanson's grandson's campaign to name Hanson the "first president of the United States" was successful in having Hanson's statue placed in Statuary Hall in the US Capitol, even though, according to historian Gregory Stiverson, Hanson was not one of Maryland's foremost leaders of the Revolutionary era. Presumably due to this campaign, Hanson is often still dubiously listed as the first president of Congress under the Articles.

The function of the president of the Continental Congress may be more akin to that of a vice president's constitutional role as the president of the United States Senate.

== Seal ==
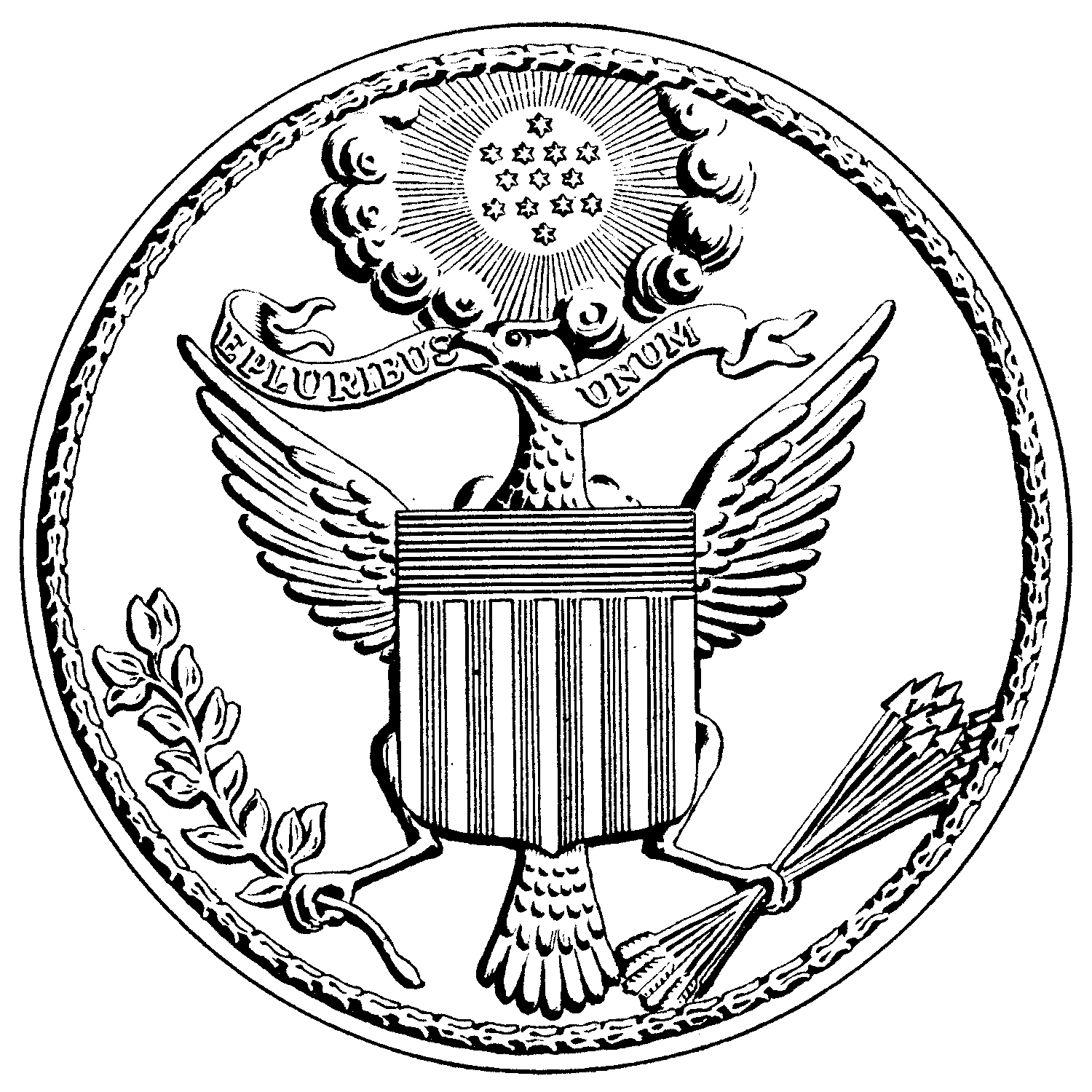
Drawing of the original 1782 Great Seal of the United States

Shortly after the creation of the first die for the Great Seal of the United States, the Congress of the Confederation ordered a smaller seal for the use of the President of the Congress. It was a small oval, with the crest from the Great Seal (the radiant constellation of thirteen stars surrounded by clouds) in the center, with the motto E Pluribus Unum above it. Benson Lossing claimed it was used by all the Presidents of the Congress after 1782, probably to seal envelopes on correspondence sent to the Congress, though only examples from Thomas Mifflin are documented. This seal's use did not pass over to the new government in 1789.

== See also ==
- Confederation period
- History of the United States (1776–1789)
- Founding Fathers of the United States
