= Committee of the States =

American government agency

A Committee of the States
Committee overview
- Formed: 1784
- Dissolved: 1784
- Type: body
- Parent Committee: Congress of the Confederation
- Key document: Articles of Confederation and Perpetual Union Articles 5,9,10

A Committee of the States was an arm of the United States government under the Articles of Confederation and Perpetual Union. The committee consisted of one member from each state and was designed to carry out the functions of government while the Congress of the Confederation was in recess.

The committee was in effect for only one year, 1784, and never achieved a quorum.

== History ==
In the draft of the Articles of Confederation by John Dickinson and the draft committee, this committee was called the Council of State, vested with executive and staff control for commerce, trade, education and issues as delegated by Congress. A minimum of nine of the thirteen states would have had to vote in favor of delegating any new powers to the council, a model after the various administrative committees set up during the American Revolutionary War. Instead, the Second Continental Congress changed it to Committee of the States, with limited management powers only when Congress was not in session.

The committee was set up in 1784 on the proposal of Thomas Jefferson, then a congressman from Virginia. The committee "quarrelled very soon, split into two parties, [and] abandoned their post." This was the only time the committee was formed, and it never achieved a quorum to perform its administrative duties.

== Powers ==
The congressional powers that did not require nine votes were:

- Oversee foreign affairs
- Appoint and receive ambassadors
- Rules of prize
- Create and appointing high sea courts
- Establish post roads and offices
- Fix postage rates
- Appoint general military officers
- Establish military rules and regulations
- Chose a president of the Congress
- Establishing standards of weights and measures
- Indian trade and affairs regulation
