= Richard Adams (Virginia politician) =

American politician (1726–1800)

Member of the Virginia Senate from Henrico, Louisa and Goochland Counties
- In office 1778–1782

Member of the Virginia House of Delegates from Henrico County
- In office 1776–1778

Member of the House of Burgesses from Henrico County
- In office 1765–1776
- Succeeded by: position eliminated

Member of the House of Burgesses from New Kent County
- In office 1752–1765

Mayor of Richmond
- In office December 1786 – February 1788

Personal details
- Born: May 17, 1726 Cumberland Farm, New Kent County, Virginia, Colony of Virginia), British America
- Died: August 1, 1800 (aged 74) Richmond, Virginia, U.S.
- Resting place: Hollywood cemetery, Richmond, Virginia
- Spouse: Elizabeth Griffin
- Children: 6 sons, 5 daughters
- Relatives: Thomas Adams(brother); Cyrus Griffin (brother-in-law)

Military service
- Allegiance: United States

Richard Adams (May 17, 1726 – August 1 or 2, 1800) was a merchant, planter and politician from Virginia, who served in both houses of the Virginia General Assembly, as well as the Virginia Revolutionary Conventions, and previously in the House of Burgesses.

== Early years ==
Adams was born in 1726, probably on his father's Cumberland plantation near the Pamunkey River in New Kent County, Virginia. He was the fourth son of eight children born to local merchant and planter Ebenezer Adams and his wife, the former Tabitha Cocke, and named after his grandfather (as was his eldest brother, who had already died as an infant). His father was born in London, England, settled in Virginia before 1714 and became a merchant and planter in the colony, receiving land grants in New Kent County and neighboring Henrico County. His mother was from one of the First Families of Virginia, the daughter of merchant Richard Cocke (1673-circa 1720) of Bremo plantation in Henrico County and his first wife Ann Bowler (1674-1705). Her uncle Bowler Cocke (1696-1771) was the Henrico county clerk and member of the House of Burgesses (1752–65, after marrying Elizabeth Hill Carter, the daughter of former speaker Edward Hill of downstream Charles City County and widow of John Carter of Corotoman plantation in Lancaster County). Because his three older brothers died as infants, Adams became the primary heir of his father's estate and received an education appropriate to his class. Three of his sisters married prominent planter/politicians: Tabitha (b. 1728) married Richard Eppes, Anne (1731-1775) became the second wife and widow of Col. Francis Smith of Essex County, and Sarah married Col. John Fry of Albemarle County.

== Career ==
Adams succeeded to his father's mercantile business, and became quite wealthy, with his brother Thomas handling to firm's operations in England from 1762 until 1774. Although a fire at his lumber business in 1769 endangered the new town, by 1770, he was probably Richmond's wealthiest citizen, and also speculated in land throughout the Commonwealth. One historian estimated his holdings included 10,865 acres of land in six counties (half in newly created Henry County on the North Carolina border), 108 slaves, 36 horses, 134 cattle, and two lots in Richmond. A modern historian estimates that at his death Adams owned at least 16,761 acres, including his residence (on what was variously known as "Church Hill" for historic St. John's Episcopal Church, or "Adams Hill" for his residence), a plantation at White Oak Swamp in surrounding Henrico County, his father's Cumberland Town plantation in New Kent County, a plantation in Essex County, as well as land in the upriver or western counties (Augusta, Botetourt, Fluvanna, Goochland and Patrick). He also owned a coal mine in Goochland County and a half-interest in 3,000 acres in Fayette County, in what became Kentucky.

Adams political career began before 1752 as one of the justices of the peace in New Kent County, and he continued in that position until about 1774, although he had moved upstream to Henrico County and the what became the new town of Richmond on the falls of the James River. Adams was elected to the Henrico parish vestry in 1761 and remained on the vestry until at least 1773 when some records were lost. Voters from New Kent County elected Adams to the House of Burgesses, and he served part-time in that position. After he moved upstream on the James River to what would become the new city of Richmond, voters in Henrico County elected him to represent them in the House of Burgesses. As relations with Britain worsened, Adams represented Henrico County in the Virginia Revolutionary Conventions, then in the first session of the Virginia House of Delegates. In 1778, voters from Henrico County and Goochland and Louisa Counties to the west elected him to represent them in the Virginia Senate.

Adams also served on the Richmond City Council, and fellow council members elected him as Mayor, a position he held 1786-1788.

== Personal life ==
Adams married Elizabeth Griffin (1736-1800) on April 10, 1755. They had six sons and five daughters, most of whom reached adulthood. Although Ebenezer died as an infant in 1771, his brothers Thomas Bowler Adams (1759-1794), Richard Jr.(1760-1817), William (1764-1787), John (1773-1825), and Samuel (1776-1821) all reached adulthood and married. Although the eldest daughters Tabitha (1756-1828) and Elizabeth (1757-1832) did not marry, two sisters married prominent men and bore children. Ann (1762-1820) married prominent planter and politician Mayo Carrington and Alice (1768-1802) married William Marshall, the brother of future chief justice John Marshall and himself for years the city's Commonwealth Attorney and later clerk of the U.S. District Court. Richard Adams Jr. (1760-1817), who married first the widow Elizabeth Southall Randolph and later the widow Sarah Travers Hay is sometimes confused with his father. Their most prominent son, John, studied in Edinburgh, became a physician and prominent businessman who also served as Richmond's mayor, nearly two decades after his father's death. This Richard Adams survived his brother Thomas, who married and moved to the frontier to handle business and land there, but died without children. Therefore, this man's grand son William and Smith (who married the daughter of Mrs. Thomas Adams) became two of Thomas Adams' heirs, with William Jr. ultimately moving to the frontier in what became Bath County, Virginia.

== Death and legacy ==
Thomas died at some time in the night of August 1–2, 1800. He was buried in a cemetery at Marshall and 23rd Streets in Richmond, near what is now the historic John Marshall House, but was reinterred in 1892 at the now historic Hollywood cemetery. Several of his children continued his business and political careers.

Richmond named a street in his honor and his former residence still exists as Richmond Hill.

The home where he was raised in New Kent County still exists, and is now on the National Register of Historic Places, although the house was extensively revised several times, including during restoration in the 1930s toward a time after this man's death, and the surrounding land is now much smaller.

The Virginia Historical Society holds the family's papers.
