= Cyrus Griffin =

American lawyer and politician (1748–1810)

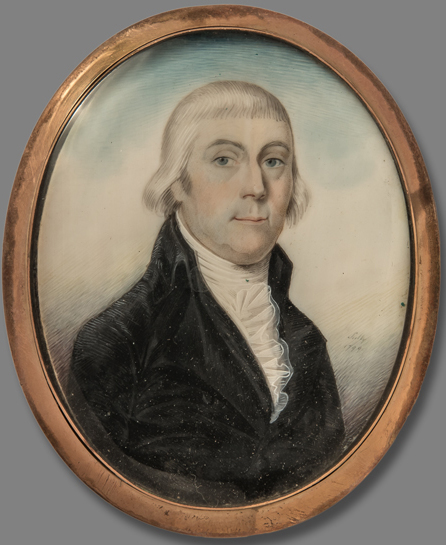
- 1799 portrait

Judge of the United States District Court for the District of Virginia
- In office November 28, 1789 – December 14, 1810
- Appointed by: George Washington
- Preceded by: Seat established
- Succeeded by: John Tyler Sr.

10th President of the Confederation Congress
- In office January 22, 1788 – November 2, 1788
- Preceded by: Arthur St. Clair
- Succeeded by: Office abolished

Member of the Virginia House of Delegates from Lancaster County
- In office October 16, 1786 – October 14, 1787 Serving with James Gordon
- Preceded by: James Ball Jr.
- Succeeded by: James Ball Jr.

Member of the Virginia House of Delegates from Lancaster County
- In office May 5, 1777 – 1778 Serving with James Gordon
- Preceded by: Jesse Ball
- Succeeded by: Charles Bell

Personal details
- Born: July 16, 1748 Farnham Parish, Colony of Virginia, British America
- Died: December 14, 1810 (aged 62) Yorktown, Virginia, US
- Spouse: Christina Stewart (m. 1770; died 1807)
- Relatives: Samuel Griffin (brother)
- Education: University of Edinburgh; Middle Temple

Cyrus Griffin (July 16, 1748 – December 14, 1810) was an American lawyer and politician, who served as the final President of the Congress of the Confederation and first United States district judge of the United States District Court for the District of Virginia.

== Education and career ==
Born on July 16, 1748, to the former Mary Anne Bertrand and her husband Col. Leroy Griffin in Farnham Parish (now Farnham), then in Lancaster County (which became part of Richmond County in his lifetime), Colony of Virginia, British America, He was a descendant of an Englishman named Thomas Griffin, who settled to the Virginia Colony in the early 1600s, and received land grants and purchased land including from Edward Bradshaw of Lancaster County. That Thomas Griffin may have emigrated with relatives, for one old genealogist stated his widow married Samuel Griffin of Northumberland County, and bore another Col. Leroy Griffin of Rappahannock County, who married Winifed Corbin (daughter of a member of the King's Council) and bore sons Thomas Griffin (who became a burgess), Corbin Griffin of Middlesex County, and daughter Winifred who married Burgess and Col. Peter Presley of Northumberland House, and whose only daughter, also Winifred, married Anthony Thornton and whose son therefore was Col. Presley Thornton who served on the King's Council 1760-1769. Clearly, this Griffin was a patriot and also had two older brothers as well as a sister who married Col. Richard Adams who served multiple terms in the state legislature as well as became mayor of Virginia (which became the new state's capital during this man's lifetime). Thomas Bertrand Griffin, the eldest son, inherited his maternal grandfather's and uncles estates, Belle Isle in Lancaster County and also served as the Lancaster County clerk 1770-1777. Another slightly older brother Samuel Griffin also became a Virginia lawyer, and Continental Army officer before beginning a political career that included service in the U.S. House of Representatives. Another brother, Dr. Corbin Griffin (d. 1813) practiced medicine in Yorktown and became the state surgeon during the Revolutionary War but was imprisoned by the British, and after his release served in the state senate.

Like his brothers, Cyrus received a private education appropriate to his class in Virginia, then sailed to England to complete his education. He studied law at the University of Edinburgh in Scotland and at the Middle Temple in London.

== Legal and political career ==
Admitted to the Virginia bar, Griffin had a private legal practice in Lancaster County and surrounding areas in the Colony of Virginia from 1774 to 1777.

Lancaster County voters elected him as one of their two part-time representatives in the Virginia House of Delegates, and he served from 1777 to 1778 (resigning to serve in the Continental Congress as discussed below), and later from 1786 to 1787 (during which session his brother represented Williamsburg). Fellow legislators elected him among Virginia's delegates to the Second Continental Congress, where he served from 1778 to 1780.

He was a Judge of the Court of Appeals in Cases of Capture from 1780 to 1787.

Griffin became a delegate to the Ninth Congress of the Confederation from 1787 to 1788, serving as the final President of the Congress of the Confederation under the Articles of Confederation in 1788. He aligned with the Federalist party and served as United States Commissioner to the Creek Nation in 1789.

== Federal judicial service ==
Griffin received a recess appointment from President George Washington on November 28, 1789, to the United States District Court for the District of Virginia, to a new seat authorized by 1 Stat. 73. He was nominated to the same position by President Washington on February 8, 1790. He was confirmed by the United States Senate on February 10, 1790, and received his commission the same day. His service terminated on December 14, 1810, due to his death in Yorktown, Virginia. He was interred in Bruton Parish Church in Williamsburg, Virginia.

== Personal life ==
Griffin married Christina Stewart, oldest daughter of John Stewart, the sixth Earl of Traquair, in 1770. They married with some subterfuge because of her father's objections, since her family was Catholic and Griffin Protestant. They had at least one child, a daughter Mary, who married her cousin Thomas Griffin, son of Dr. Corbin Griffin of Yorktown and a member of the Virginia House of Delegates as well as U.S. Congress.

== Death and legacy ==
Griffin suffered from various illnesses late in his life, and a letter he wrote from a Newport, Rhode Island, health resort about his diminished appetite and swollen limbs to his relative Dr. Samuel Stuart Griffin survives. He returned to Virginia and died on December 14, 1810 at Yorktown, in York County, probably at the home of his daughter or of Dr. Griffin as referenced in that letter. However, a state historical marker commemorating his legislative and judicial career is further north along the coast in Richmond County near Belle Isle State Park, which includes two historic houses, one constructed by a descendant.

== Sources ==
- Cyrus Griffin at Archontology.org".
- United States Congress. "Cyrus Griffin (id: G000459)". Biographical Directory of the United States Congress.

Political offices
Preceded by Arthur St. Clair	President of the Congress of the Confederation; 1788	Office superseded George Washington becomes President of the United States; Frederick Muhlenberg becomes Speaker of the United States House of Representatives
Legal offices
New creation	Judge of the United States District Court for the District of Virginia; 1789–1810	Succeeded by John Tyler Sr.
