= Deerfield, Virginia =

- Census-designated place (CDP)
- Location within Virginia
- Coordinates: 38°11′44″N 79°24′38″W
- Country: United States
- State: Virginia
- County: Augusta

Area
  - Total: 3.3 sq mi (8.5 km^{2})
- Elevation: 1,742 ft (531 m)

Population (2020 Census)
  - Total: 110
  - Density: 33/sq mi (13/km^{2})
- Time zone: UTC-5 (Eastern (EST))
  - Summer (DST): UTC-4 (EDT)
- FIPS code: 51-21872
- GNIS feature ID: 2584836

Deerfield is a census-designated place (CDP) in Augusta County, Virginia, United States. As of the 2020 census, Deerfield had a population of 110. It has a very low population density, as it is a small unincorporated rural area. The Deerfield mall is the main store of the town. Deerfield consists of farms, hunting areas, old plantation houses, and scenic views of the mountains. Deer, bear, and other forms of wildlife fill the area. Deerfield has its own post office, fire department, rescue squad, dump, and a historic school house. Students who live in Deerfield attend Churchville Elementary School, Buffalo Gap Middle School, and Buffalo Gap High School.

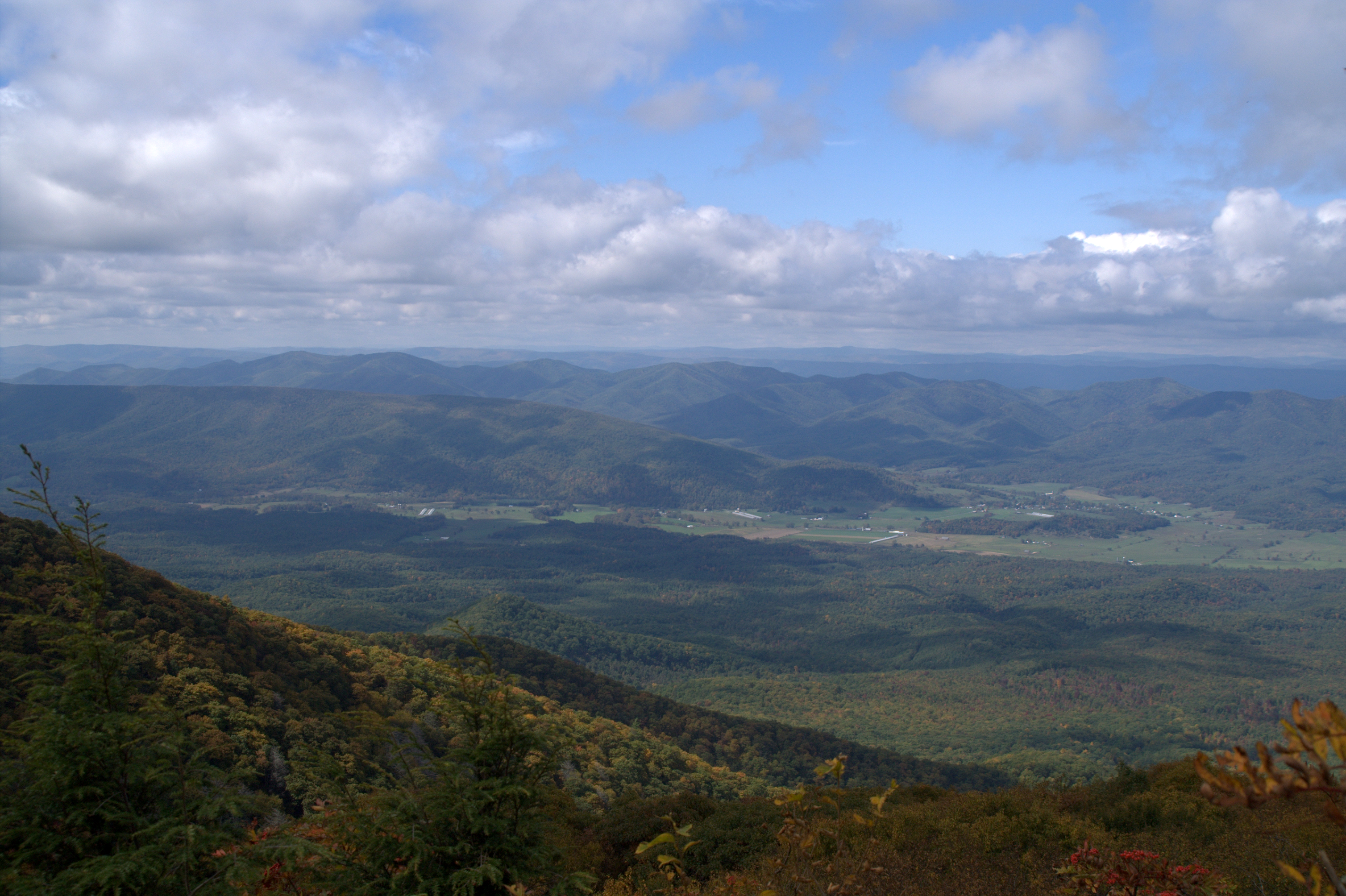
View of Deerfield Valley

The Deerfield School was listed on the National Register of Historic Places in 1986.

== Demographics ==
Historical population
Census	Pop.	Note	%±
2010	132		—
2020	110		−16.7%
U.S. Decennial Census; 2010 2020

Deerfield was first listed as a census designated place in the 2010 U.S. census.

== Climate ==
The climate in this area is characterized by hot, humid summers and generally mild to cool winters. According to the Köppen Climate Classification system, Deerfield has a humid subtropical climate, abbreviated "Cfa" on climate maps.
