= Congress of the Confederation =

Governing body of the United States from 1781 to 1789

United States in Congress Assembled
- Great Seal of the United States (1782)

Type
- Type: Unicameral
- Term limits: 3 years in 6-year period

History
- Established: March 1, 1781
- Disbanded: March 3, 1789
- Preceded by: Second Continental Congress
- Succeeded by: United States Congress

Leadership
- President of Congress: Samuel Huntington (first); Cyrus Griffin (last)
- Secretary: Charles Thomson

Structure
- Seats: Variable, ~50
- Committees: Committee of the States
- Committees: Committee of the Whole
- Length of term: 1 year
- Salary: None

Elections
- Voting system: Legislature of the various states
- Last election: 1788

Meeting place
- Pennsylvania State House (present-day Independence Hall), Philadelphia (first); City Hall (present-day Federal Hall); New York City (last)

Constitution
- Articles of Confederation

Footnotes
- Though there were about 50 members of the Congress at any given time, each state delegation voted en bloc, with each state having a single vote.

The Congress of the Confederation, or the Confederation Congress, formally referred to as the United States in Congress Assembled, was the governing body of the United States from March 1, 1781, until March 3, 1789, during the Confederation period. A unicameral body with legislative and executive function, it was composed of delegates appointed by the legislatures of the thirteen states. Each state delegation had one vote. The Congress was created by the Articles of Confederation and Perpetual Union upon its ratification in 1781, formally replacing the Second Continental Congress.

The Congress continued to refer to itself as the Continental Congress throughout its eight-year history. Modern historians, however, separate it from the two earlier congresses, which operated under slightly different rules and procedures until the end of the Revolutionary War. Membership of the Second Continental Congress automatically carried over to the Congress of the Confederation, and Charles Thomson, secretary of the First and Second Continental Congress, continued in that capacity in the Congress of the Confederation.

Major acts of Congress in the confederation period include, forming the Bank of the United States (now known as, the First Bank), the Land Acts in 1784 and 1785, and the Northwest Ordinance. The Congress of the Confederation was succeeded by the Congress of the United States as provided for in the new Constitution of the United States, drafted on September 17, 1787, in Philadelphia, ratified by each of the states, and adopted by the Confederation Congress in 1788.

== History ==
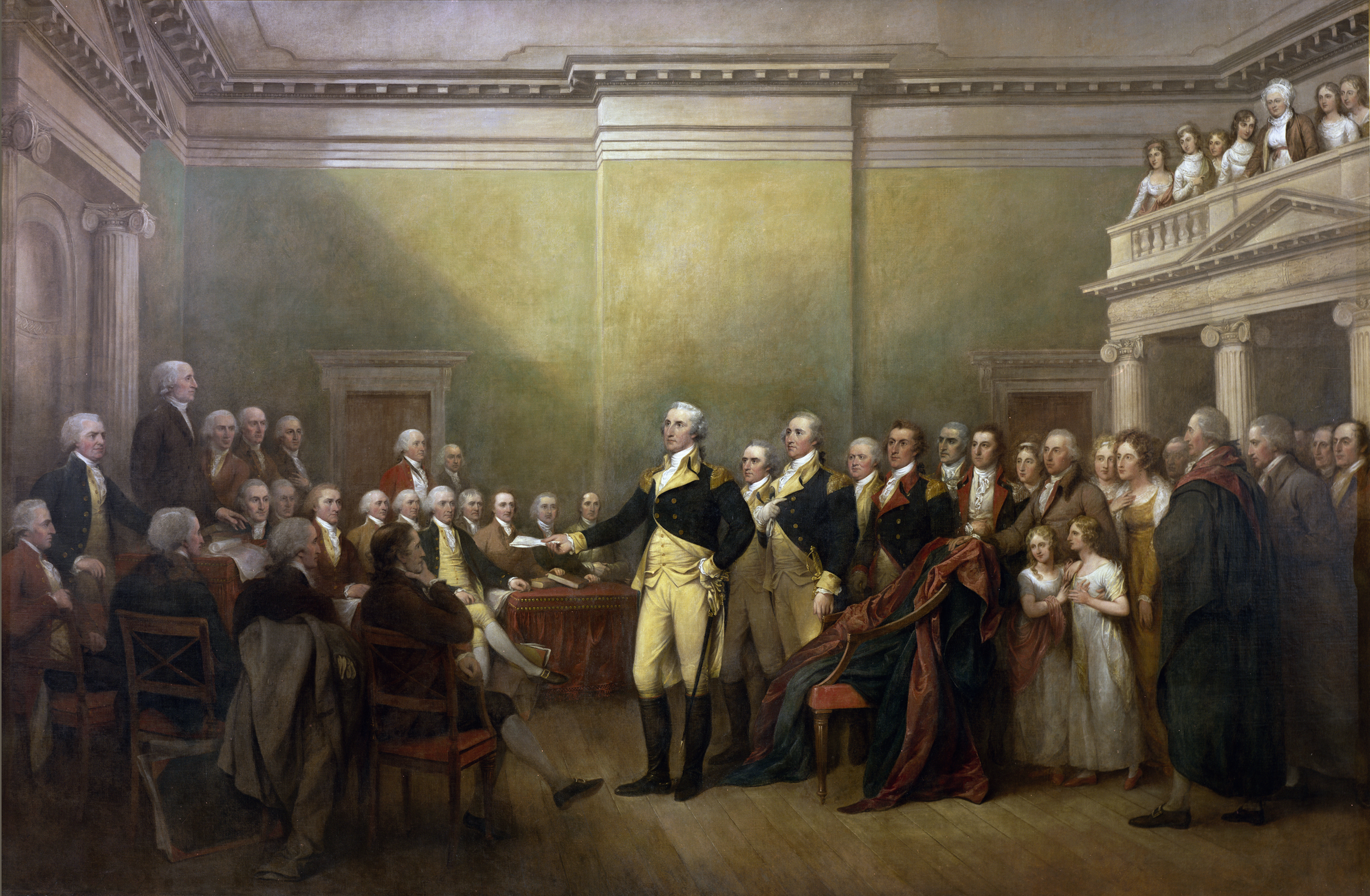
General George Washington Resigning His Commission, an 1824 portrait of George Washington by John Trumbull

On March 1, 1781, the Articles of Confederation and Perpetual Union were signed by delegates of Maryland at a meeting of the Second Continental Congress in Philadelphia, which then declared the Articles ratified. As historian Edmund Burnett noted, "There was no new organization of any kind, not even the election of a new President." The legislative body continued to refer to itself as the Continental Congress. Nevertheless, despite its being generally the same exact governing body, with some changes in membership over the years as delegates came and went individually according to their own personal reasons and upon instructions of their state governments, some modern historians would later refer to the Continental Congress after the ratification of the Articles as the Congress of the Confederation or the Confederation Congress.

The Congress of the Confederation opened in the last stages of the American Revolution. Combat ended in October 1781, with the surrender of the British after the Siege and Battle of Yorktown. The British, however continued to occupy New York City, while the American delegates in Paris, named by the Congress, negotiated the terms of peace with Great Britain. Based on preliminary articles with the British negotiators made on November 30, 1782, and approved by the "Congress of the Confederation" on April 15, 1783, the Treaty of Paris was further signed on September 3, 1783, and ratified by the Confederation Congress then sitting at the Maryland State House in Annapolis on January 14, 1784. This formally ended the American Revolutionary War between Great Britain and the thirteen former colonies, which on July 4, 1776, had declared independence. In December 1783, General George Washington, commander-in-chief of the Continental Army, journeyed to Annapolis after saying farewell to his officers (at Fraunces Tavern) and men who had just reoccupied New York City after the departing British Army. On December 23, at the Maryland State House, where the Congress met in the Old Senate Chamber, he addressed the civilian leaders and delegates of Congress and returned to them the signed commission they had voted him back in June 1775, at the beginning of the conflict. With that simple gesture of acknowledging the first civilian power over the military, he took his leave and returned by horseback the next day to his home and family at Mount Vernon near the colonial river port city on the Potomac River at Alexandria in Virginia.

Congress had little power, and without the external threat of a war against the British, it became quite difficult to get enough delegates to meet to form a quorum. Nonetheless, the Congress still managed to pass important laws, most notably the Northwest Ordinance of 1787.

The country incurred a massive debt as a result of the War of Independence. In 1784, the total Confederation debt was nearly $40 million. Of that sum, $8 million was owed to the French and Dutch. Of the domestic debt, government bonds, known as loan-office certificates, composed $11.5 million, certificates on interest indebtedness $3.1 million, and continental certificates $16.7 million.

The certificates were non-interest bearing notes issued for supplies purchased or impressed, and to pay soldiers and officers. To pay the interest and principal of the debt, Congress had twice proposed an amendment to the Articles granting them the power to lay a 5% duty on imports, but amendments to the Articles required the consent of all thirteen states: the 1781 impost plan had been rejected by Rhode Island and Virginia, while the revised plan, discussed in 1783, was rejected by New York.

Without revenue, except for meager voluntary state requisitions, Congress could not even pay the interest on its outstanding debt. The states, meanwhile, regularly failed or refused to meet the requisitions requested of them by Congress.

To that end, in September 1786, after resolving a series of disputes regarding their common border along the Potomac River, delegates of Maryland and Virginia called for a larger assembly to discuss various situations and governing problems to meet in Annapolis, Maryland, the Maryland state capital. The Annapolis Convention in 1786, which included additional state representatives who joined the sessions, first attempted to look into improving the earlier original Articles of Confederation and Perpetual Union. There were enough problems to bear further discussion and deliberation that the Convention called for a wider meeting to recommend changes and meet the next year in the late Spring of 1787 in Philadelphia.

The Confederation Congress itself endorsed this and issued invitations for the states to send delegates, after meeting in secret all summer in Philadelphia's Independence Hall. The Philadelphia Convention, under the leadership of George Washington, developed a proposed new Constitution for the United States to replace the 1776–1778 Articles. The Confederation Congress received and submitted the new Constitution document to the states, and the Constitution was later ratified by enough states (nine were required) to become operative in June 1788. On September 13, 1788, the Confederation Congress set the date for choosing the electors in the Electoral College that was set up for choosing the first president of the United States as January 7, 1789, the date for the electors to vote for the president as February 4, 1789. Additionally, the date for the Constitution to become operative as set for March 4, 1789, when the new Congress of the United States should convene.

The Congress of the Confederation continued to conduct business for another month after setting the various dates. On October 10, 1788, Congress formed a quorum for the last time; afterward, although delegates would occasionally appear, there were never enough to officially conduct business. The last meeting of the Continental Congress was held March 2, 1789, two days before the new Constitutional government took over; only one member was present at said meeting, Philip Pell, an ardent Anti-Federalist and opponent of the Constitution, who was accompanied by the Congressional secretary. Pell oversaw the meeting and adjourned the Congress sine die.

== Presiding officer ==
The Continental Congress was presided over by a president (referred to in many official records as President of the United States in Congress Assembled), who was a member of Congress elected by the other delegates to serve as a neutral discussion moderator during meetings. Elected to a non-renewable one-year term, this person also chaired the Committee of the States when Congress was in recess and performed other administrative functions. He was not, however, an executive in the way the later president of the United States is a chief executive since all of the functions he executed were under the direct control of Congress. There were ten presidents of Congress under the Articles. The first, Samuel Huntington, took office as president of the Continental Congress on September 28, 1779.

== Meeting sites ==
The Second Continental Congress was meeting at the Old Pennsylvania State House (Independence Hall), in Philadelphia, Pennsylvania, at the time the Articles of Confederation entered into force on March 1, 1781, but left after an anti-government protest by several hundred soldiers of the Continental Army in June 1783. Congress moved its meeting site successively to Princeton, New Jersey; Annapolis, Maryland; Trenton, New Jersey, and then in January 1785 New York City, which remained the seat of government for several years.

== List of sessions ==
First Congress
March 2, 1781 (Note: Ratification of the Articles of Confederation was concluded on February 2, 1781, and certified as having come into force by the Continental Congress on March 1, 1781, and the United States in Congress Assembled government convened for the first time on March 2, 1781.) – November 3, 1781	Pennsylvania State House, Philadelphia, Pennsylvania
President: Samuel Huntington (Note: President of the Second Continental Congress from September 28, 1779.) (until July 10, 1781); Thomas McKean (from July 10, 1781)

Second Congress
November 5, 1781 – November 2, 1782	Pennsylvania State House, Philadelphia, Pennsylvania
President: John Hanson

Third Congress
November 4, 1782 – November 1, 1783	Pennsylvania State House, Philadelphia, Pennsylvania (until June 21, 1783)
November 4, 1782 – November 1, 1783	Nassau Hall, Princeton, New Jersey (from June 30, 1783)
President: Elias Boudinot

Fourth Congress
November 3, 1783 – June 3, 1784	Nassau Hall, Princeton, New Jersey (until November 4, 1783)
November 3, 1783 – June 3, 1784	Maryland State House, Annapolis, Maryland (from November 26, 1783)
President: Thomas Mifflin

Fifth Congress
November 1, 1784 – November 6, 1785	French Arms Tavern, Trenton, New Jersey (until December 24, 1784)
November 1, 1784 – November 6, 1785	City Hall, New York, New York (from January 11, 1785)
President: Richard Henry Lee (from November 30, 1784)

Sixth Congress
November 7, 1785 – November 2, 1786	City Hall, New York, New York
President: John Hancock (from November 23, 1785, until June 5, 1786); Nathaniel Gorham (from June 6, 1786)

Seventh Congress
November 6, 1786 – November 4, 1787	City Hall, New York, New York
President: Arthur St. Clair (from February 2, 1787)

Eighth Congress
November 5, 1787 – October 31, 1788	City Hall, New York, New York (until October 6, 1788)
November 5, 1787 – October 31, 1788	Walter Livingston House, New York, New York (from October 8, 1788)
President: Cyrus Griffin (from January 22, 1788)

Ninth Congress
November 3, 1788 (Note: Congress did not convene on November 3, 1788, the stated first day of the 1788–89 Congressional Year because of a lack of a quorum (namely, delegates present from seven of the 13 states). Through March 2, 1789, delegates from various states occasionally gathered, but never in sufficient number to constitute a quorum.) – March 3, 1789 (Note: On September 13, 1788, the Confederation Congress resolved that March 4, 1789, would be the commencement date of the federal government under the Constitution, effectively dissolving Congress on March 3, 1789.)	Walter Livingston House, New York, New York
President: Cyrus Griffin (de jure, until November 15, 1788) vacant (from November 15, 1788) (Note: As Congress could not transact official business due to the lack of a quorum, a president could not be elected for the 1788–89 Congressional Year. As a result, Cyrus Griffin, who had been elected to the office January 22, 1788, remained the de jure president of Congress until he resigned on November 15, 1788.)

== See also ==
- Committee of the States
- Founding Fathers of the United States
- History of the United States (1776–1789)
- List of delegates to the Continental Congress

== Bibliography ==
- Burnett, Edmund C. (1975). The Continental Congress. Greenwood Publishing. ISBN 0-8371-8386-3.
- Henderson, H. James (1987). Party Politics in the Continental Congress. Boston: Rowman & Littlefield. ISBN 0-8191-6525-5.
- Jensen, Merrill (1950). New Nation: A History of the United States During the Confederation, 1781–1789. New York: Knopf.
- McLaughlin, Andrew C. (1935). A Constitutional History of the United States. Appleton-Century-Crofts. ISBN 978-1-931313-31-5.
- Montross, Lynn (1970). The Reluctant Rebels; the Story of the Continental Congress, 1774–1789. New York: Barnes & Noble. ISBN 0-389-03973-X.
- Morris, Richard B. (1987). The Forging of the Union, 1781–1789. New York: Harper & Row. ISBN 0-06-091424-6.
- Morris, Richard B. (1956). "The Confederation Period and the American Historian". William and Mary Quarterly. 13 (2): 139–156. doi:10.2307/1920529. JSTOR 1920529.
- Rakove, Jack N. (1979). The Beginnings of National Politics: An Interpretive History of the Continental Congress. New York: Knopf. ISBN 0-394-42370-4.

Preceded by Second Continental Congress	Legislature of the United States; March 1, 1781 – March 4, 1789	Succeeded by First United States Congress
