= Peyton Randolph (governor) =

American politician (1779–1828)

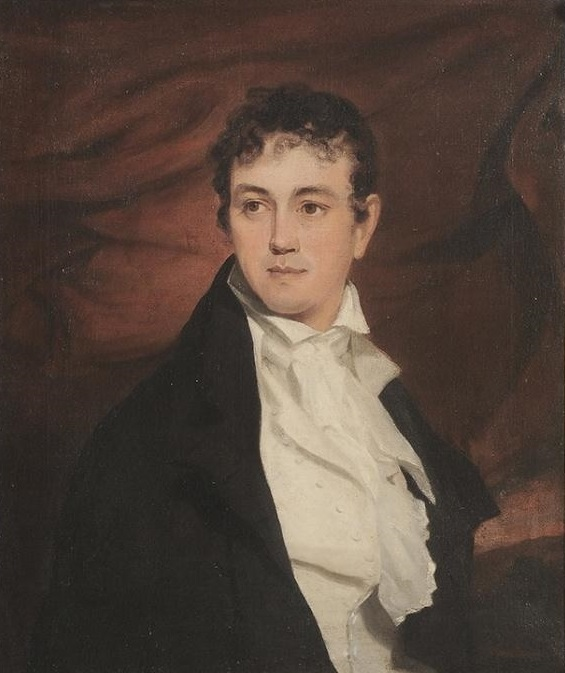
- Portrait by Thomas Sully, 1806

Acting Governor of Virginia
- In office December 26, 1811 – January 3, 1812
- Preceded by: George W. Smith
- Succeeded by: James Barbour

Personal details
- Born: 1779 Williamsburg, Virginia
- Died: December 26, 1828 (aged 49) Richmond, Virginia
- Occupation: Politician

Peyton Randolph (1779 – December 26, 1828) was a lawyer and Democratic-Republican politician from Virginia who, as the senior member of the Governor's Council, served as acting Governor of Virginia for eight days, following the death of George William Smith on December 26, 1811. He went on to be the official reporter of the Virginia Supreme Court until his death in 1828.

== Biography ==
Randolph was born in Williamsburg, Virginia to Elizabeth Nicholas and Edmund Jennings Randolph. Peyton Randolph's father had been a delegate to the Continental Congress, Governor of Virginia, and the first U.S. Attorney General, and his great uncle and namesake was Founding Father Peyton Randolph. The younger Peyton Randolph graduated from the College of William and Mary in 1798, where he studied law, and then began private practice in Richmond.

Randolph was elected to the Virginia Privy Council and served there from 1809 to 1812. Following the death of Governor George William Smith and 68 others in the Richmond Theatre fire on December 26, 1811, Randolph became the acting governor of Virginia from December 26, 1811, until James Barbour was elected on January 3, 1812.

For many years Randolph was a clerk of the Virginia Supreme Court of Appeals. He became the Court's official reporter from 1821 until his death, producing the Virginia Reports, the Virginia Supreme Court's official published case records. Randolph published five volumes of the Reports, with a sixth volume published posthumously in 1829.

Still working on his court reports, Peyton Randolph died of pulmonary disease in Richmond on December 26, 1828.

Political offices
Preceded by George William Smith; Governor	Acting Governor of Virginia; 1811–1812	Succeeded by James Barbour; Governor
