= George William Smith (politician) =

American politician in Virginia (1762–1811)

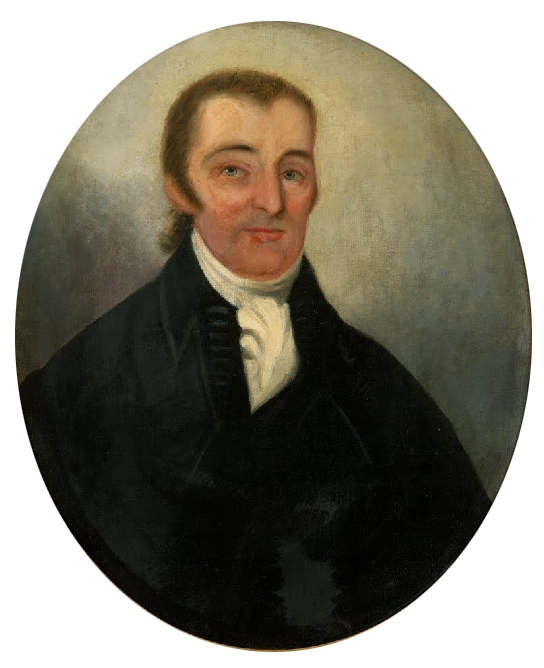

17th Governor of Virginia
- In office April 3, 1811 – December 26, 1811
- Preceded by: James Monroe
- Succeeded by: Peyton Randolph (acting)

Member of the Virginia Council of State
- In office December 15, 1807 – December 26, 1811

Member of the Virginia House of Delegates from Richmond City
- In office December 7, 1801 – December 6, 1802
- Preceded by: Charles Copland
- Succeeded by: John Adams

Member of the Virginia House of Delegates from Essex County
- In office October 18, 1790 – November 11, 1794
- Preceded by: Richard Banks
- Succeeded by: Francis T. Brooke

Personal details
- Born: 1762 Essex County, Colony of Virginia, British America
- Died: December 26, 1811 (aged 49) Richmond, Virginia, U.S.
- Party: Democratic-Republican
- Spouses: Sarah Adams; Jane Reade Jones
- Parent: Meriwether Smith (father)
- Profession: Lawyer

George William Smith (1762 – December 26, 1811) was a Virginia lawyer and politician who served several terms in the Virginia House of Delegates and was twice the acting governor of the state before then being elected as the 17th Governor of Virginia. His term as elected governor was short and ended with his death in the Richmond Theatre fire of 1811.

== Early life ==
George William Smith was born in 1762 at the family estate "Bathurst" in Essex County, Virginia, to Alice Lee and Meriwether Smith. His father was a notable Virginia politician, having served in the House of Burgesses, the Continental Congress and the Virginia House of Delegates. His mother was a great-grandchild of Richard Lee I ("The Immigrant"), progenitor of the Lee Family of Virginia. George Williams Smith took up the practice of law and was married twice. His first marriage to Sarah Adams (daughter of prominent Richmond businessman and patrior Richard Adams in 1793 produced children, though his second marriage to Jane Reade Jones did not.

== Political career ==
Like his father, the younger Smith soon entered politics, representing Essex County in the Virginia House of Delegates from 1790 to 1794. He later took his law practice to Richmond and, in 1801, again won election to the state house, this time representing the city. He was elected to represent Richmond in the House in its 1807–08 session but lost his seat when his opponent, John H. Foushee, successfully contested the election results. Shortly thereafter, he was appointed to the Virginia Council of State by the General Assembly, soon becoming its president and thus the Lieutenant Governor of Virginia.

As the senior member of the Virginia Council, Smith became the acting Governor of Virginia, between the terms of John Tyler Sr. and James Monroe, for five days in January 1811. He became acting Governor again, from April to December of the same year, when Monroe resigned to become United States Secretary of State. Smith was then elected to the office in his own right as the 17th Governor of Virginia, representing the Democratic-Republican Party. However, his official tenure lasted only three weeks before his death during the great Richmond Theatre fire of December 26, 1811.

== Death and legacy ==
Governor Smith had initially reached safety, but he went back into the fire and died trying to find his young son. The Governor's sudden and unexpected death left the Virginia executive branch in turmoil, prompting acting Governor Peyton Randolph to push the legislature to appoint a successor swiftly.

Smith's ashes were placed under a rock at Monumental Church in Richmond with the ashes of other victims of the fire, including former senator and president of the Bank of Virginia, Abraham B. Venable.

Political offices
Preceded by James Monroe	Governor of Virginia; 1811	Succeeded by Peyton Randolph; Acting Governor
