= Richmond Hill (Richmond, Virginia) =

- U.S. Historic district – Contributing property
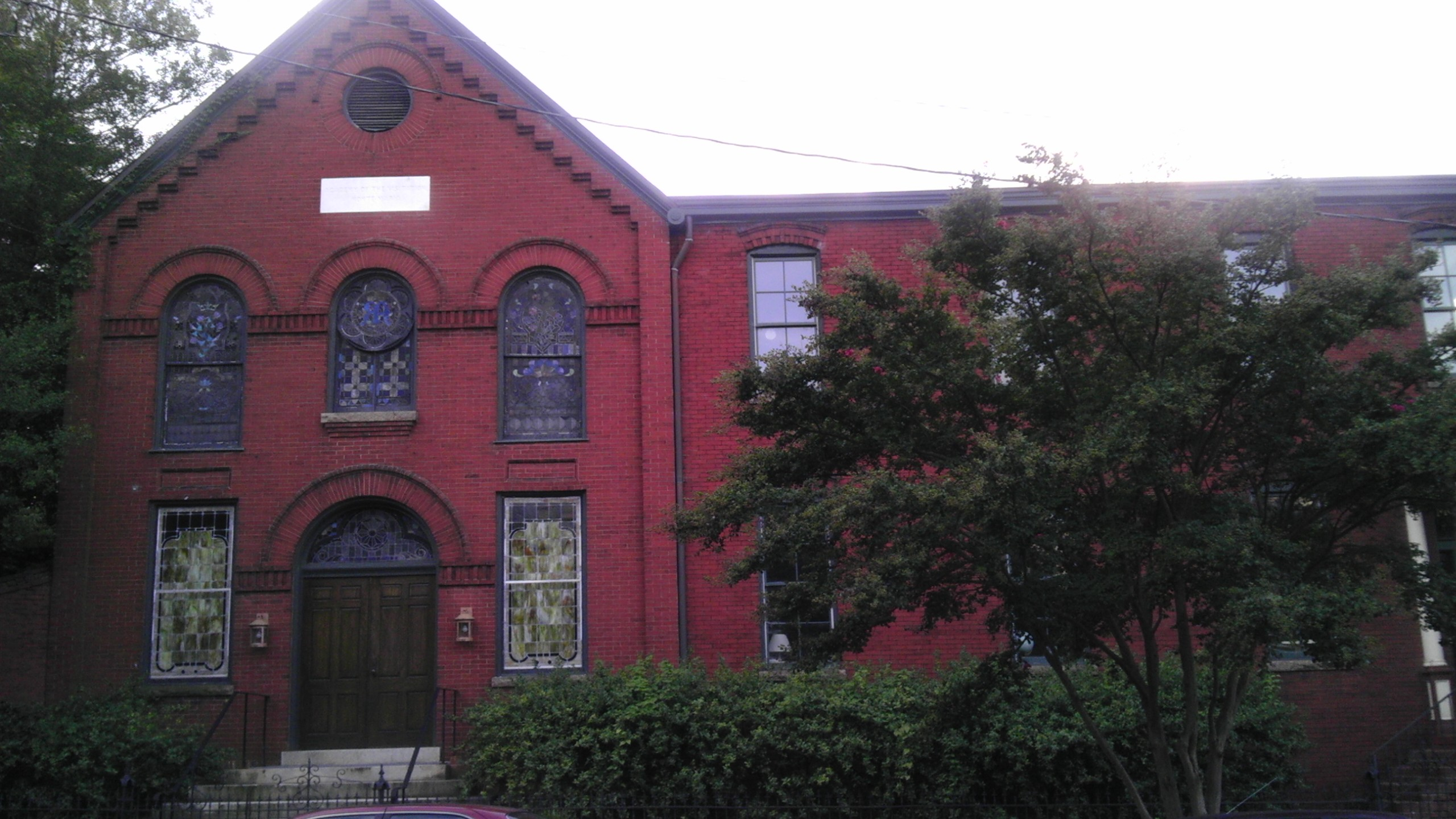
- Location: 2209 East Grace Street, Richmond, Virginia, U.S.
- Built: 1859
- Architectural style: Chateauesque
- Part of: St. John's Church Historic District (ID90002097, as increased in 1991)
- Designated CP

Richmond Hill is an ecumenical fellowship, residence and urban retreat center. The St. John's Church Historic District in Richmond, Virginia includes several churches of various denominations, including this former Catholic convent and school which is a contributing property that continues to address the area's spiritual and educational needs.

== History ==
In 1737, explorer and future planter William Byrd II named the future city from near this site on the highest of Richmond's hills. It overlooks the James River near its fall-line and faces the setting sun. The view reminded Byrd of his home Richmond-on-Thames. Native peoples called the area Tsenacomoco. Byrd commissioned Col. William Mayo to survey and lay out a city, and the survey lines remain in legal descriptions to this day.

The area known alternately as Church Hill or Richmond Hill was first developed by Richard Adams, a friend of Thomas Jefferson, beginning in 1769. Adams built a house, probably across the street from the current property, when Richmond was declared Virginia's capital in 1779. British troops occupied the wood frame house during the American Revolution. Around 1810, another house was added to the property, in the Federal style. Because of Adams' social standing, several correspondents described parties in the house. By 1844, the court clerk, Palmer, owned the house, which he sold in 1859 to William Taylor. Taylor transformed the house into an Italianate-style brick and stucco mansion. Now known alternately as the Taylor-Wilkins, Palmer-Taylor, or Adams-Taylor House, the building grew from six to 20 rooms, as well as added another storey. Richard A. Wilkins, a Virginian who had returned from operating a sugar plantation in Louisiana to educate his children, bought the property in 1860 for $20,000. His wife operated a hospital for recovering soldiers in the mansion during the Civil War, and their son watched battles from the cupola. After the Confederate capital fell in 1865, a Union general used it as his headquarters, and relegated the Taylors to the upper floor. They sold it to the Catholic bishop and moved to Tennessee.

After the war ended, Catholic Bishop John McGill requested nuns from the Archdiocese of Baltimore, to pray for the devastated city as well as to educate girls. The first order to respond was the Sisters of the Visitation, whose superior, Mother Mary Baptista, was a native of Norfolk, Virginia and sister of Father Alexander Hitzelberger (who joined the Jesuits after serving in Norfolk and Petersburg).

Although the Sisters of the Visitation were generally a contemplative order in Europe, for more than sixty years they ran an elite boarding and day school on this site, which they named Monte Maria. Other nuns who responded (and opened schools at different locations within Richmond) included the Daughters of Charity (whose school was at St. Patrick's on the opposite side of the hill/St. John's Church), and Benedictine nuns from Pennsylvania who taught at St. Mary's parochial school (also briefly staffed by the School Sisters of Notre Dame).

In 1895, following a donation from Thomas Fortune Ryan, the Visitation order built a Romanesque revival style brick chapel and service building to the east of the original Taylor House. In 1900 they enclosed the buildings and gardens with a high brick wall. In 1923 a three-story brick dormitory with Colonial Revival details was built between the house and chapel. Some smaller buildings on the property, and the old Adams mansion, were demolished circa 1929. A bequest from the Mother Superior in 1927 allowed the Visitation nuns to close the school and concentrate on their contemplative activities, so the sisters renovated the dormitories into individual cells. The nuns also produced the sacramental bread for local parishes, and even the Atlantic Fleet during the Second World War. In 1952 a print shop was added in a cinder block wing that replaced a small porch on the building's west side. In 1955 they removed the cupola, fearing a lightning strike similar to that at Trinity United Methodist Church. Although the order renovated the chapel consistent with the reforms of the Second Vatican Council, the nuns were aging and the order needed to further consolidate its properties. In 1985, the sisters decided to sell the property and build a monastery in rural Rockville, Hanover County.

== Current use ==
The historic district designation interfered with some developers' plans, and many in the community wanted to preserve both the historic structure and its spiritual mission. In February, 1986, a non-profit corporation was formed by an ecumenical group which included members of 15 denominations. It purchased the Monte Maria property the following November following a strange series of coincidences. Renovated and renamed Richmond Hill, the residential community and conference center continues the practice of daily prayers for Richmond and the surrounding metropolitan area, and works for personal spiritual development and interracial harmony. The debt to purchase the property was paid off in 2012.
