= Continental Congress =

Convention of delegates that became the governing body of the United States (1774–1789)

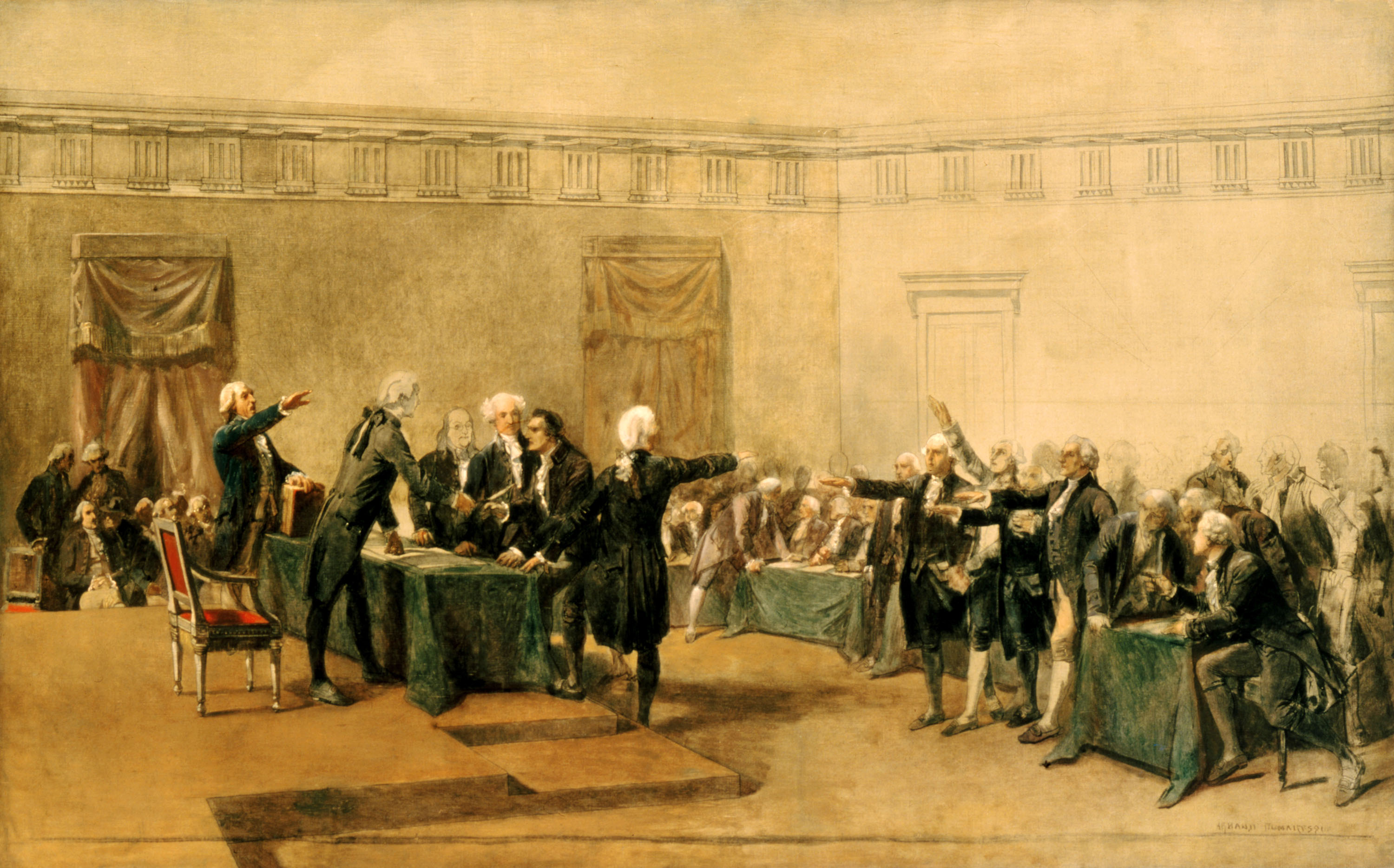
Signing of the Declaration of Independence, an 1873 portrait by Charles Édouard Armand-Dumaresq now displayed in the White House Cabinet Room

The Continental Congress was a series of legislative bodies, with some executive function, who acted as the Provisional Government for the Thirteen Colonies of Great Britain in North America, and the newly declared United States before, during, and after the American Revolutionary War. The Continental Congress refers to both the First and Second Congresses of 1774–1781 and at the time, also described the Congress of the Confederation of 1781–1789. The Confederation Congress operated as the first federal government until being replaced following ratification of the U.S. Constitution. Until 1785, the Congress met predominantly at what is today Independence Hall in Philadelphia, though it was relocated temporarily on several occasions during the Revolutionary War and the fall of Philadelphia.

The First Continental Congress convened in Philadelphia in 1774 in response to escalating tensions between the colonies and the British, which culminated in passage of the Intolerable Acts by the British Parliament following the Boston Tea Party. The First Congress met for about six weeks, mainly to try to repair the fraying relationship between Britain and the colonies while asserting the rights of colonists, proclaiming and passing the Continental Association, which was a unified trade embargo against Britain, and successfully building consensus for establishment of a second congress.

The Second Continental Congress convened in 1775, soon after hostilities broke out in Massachusetts. Soon after meeting, the Second Congress sent the Olive Branch Petition to King George III, established the Continental Army, and elected George Washington commander of the new army. After the king issued the Proclamation of Rebellion in August 1775 in response to the Battle of Bunker Hill, some members of the Second Congress concluded that peace with Britain would not be forthcoming, and began working towards unifying the colonies into a new nation. The body adopted the Lee Resolution for Independence on July 2, 1776, and the Declaration of Independence two days later, on July 4, 1776, proclaiming that the former colonies were now independent sovereign states.

The Second Continental Congress served as the provisional government of the U.S. during most of the Revolutionary War. In March 1781, the nation's first Frame of Government, the Articles of Confederation and Perpetual Union, came into force, and thus the body became what later was called the Congress of the Confederation. This unicameral governing body would convene in eight sessions before adjourning in 1789, when the 1st United States Congress under the new Constitution of the United States took over the role as the nation's legislative branch of government.

Both the First and Second Continental Congresses convened in Philadelphia, though when the city was captured during the Revolutionary War, the Second Congress was forced to meet in other locations for a time. The Congress of Confederation was also established in Philadelphia and later moved to New York City, which served as the U.S. capital from 1785 to 1790.

Much of what is known today about the daily activities of these congresses comes from the journals kept by the secretary for all three congresses, Charles Thomson. Printed contemporaneously, the Journals of the Continental Congress contain the official congressional papers, letters, treaties, reports and records. The delegates to the Continental and Confederation congresses had extensive experience in deliberative bodies, with "a cumulative total of nearly 500 years of experience in their Colonial assemblies, and fully a dozen of them had served as speakers of the houses of their legislatures."

== History ==
=== Background ===
The initial idea for the development of the Continental Congress, including the Thirteen Colonies in British America, first arose in 1754 at the start of the French and Indian War, which started as the North American front of the Seven Years' War between Britain and France. Initially known as the Albany Congress, the Congress met in Albany, New York, from June 18 to July 11, 1754, and representatives from seven of the thirteen colonies attended. Among the delegates was Benjamin Franklin of Philadelphia, who proposed that the colonies join in a confederation. Though the idea of a confederation was rejected, Franklin and others continued to argue that the colonies should act more cohesively. At the beginning of the American Revolution, committees of correspondence began building the foundation for interaction between the thirteen colonial states.

In 1765, the British Parliament passed the Stamp Act requiring that many printed materials in the colonies be produced on stamped paper produced in London, carrying an embossed revenue stamp. The act provoked the ire of merchants in New York City, Boston, and Philadelphia, who responded by placing an embargo on British imports until the Stamp Act was repealed. To present a united front in their opposition, delegates from several provinces met in the Stamp Act Congress, which convened in New York City from October 7 through 25, 1765. It issued a Declaration of Rights and Grievances, which it sent to Parliament. Under pressure from British companies hurt by the embargo, the government of Prime Minister Lord Rockingham and King George III relented, and the Stamp Act was repealed in March 1766.

The colonists' resistance to the Stamp Act served as a catalyst for subsequent acts of resistance. The Townshend Acts, which imposed indirect taxes on various items not produced within the colonies, and created a more effective means of enforcing compliance with trade regulations, passed by Parliament in 1767 and 1768, sparked renewed animosity in the colonies, which eventually resulted in the Boston Massacre of 1770. Three years later, the Tea Act, which granted the British East India Company the right to directly ship its tea to North America and the right to the duty-free export of tea from Great Britain, became law, exacerbating the colonists' resentment toward the British government, inciting the December 1773 Boston Tea Party, and inspiring the September 1774 Suffolk Resolves.

=== First Continental Congress ===
The First Continental Congress met briefly in Carpenter's Hall in Philadelphia, Pennsylvania, from September 5 to October 26, 1774. Delegates from twelve of the Thirteen Colonies that would ultimately join in the Revolutionary War participated. Only Georgia, where Loyalist feelings still outweighed Patriotic emotion, and which relied upon Great Britain for military supplies to defend settlers against possible Indian attacks, did not, nor did East and West Florida, which at the time were also British colonies. Altogether, 56 delegates attended, including George Washington, Patrick Henry, and John Adams. Other notable delegates included Samuel Adams from Massachusetts Bay and Joseph Galloway and John Dickinson from the Pennsylvania. Peyton Randolph of Virginia was its president.

Benjamin Franklin put forward the idea of such a meeting the year before, but he was unable to convince the colonies of its necessity until the Royal Navy instituted a blockade of Boston Harbor and Parliament passed the punitive Intolerable Acts in 1774, in response to the Boston Tea Party. During the congress, delegates organized an economic boycott of Great Britain in protest and petitioned the King for a redress of grievances. The colonies were united in their effort to demonstrate to the mother country their authority by virtue of their common causes and their unity, but their ultimate objectives were inconsistent. Most delegates were not yet ready to break away from Great Britain, but they most definitely wanted the king and parliament to act in what they considered a fairer manner. Delegates from the provinces of Pennsylvania and New York were given firm instructions to pursue a resolution with Great Britain. While the other colonies all held the idea of colonial rights as paramount, they were split between those who sought legislative equality with Britain and those who instead favored independence and a break from the Crown and its excesses.

=== Second Continental Congress ===
A map of eastern North America in 1775 and present-day U.S. state boundaries Thirteen Colonies Other British colonies Spanish Captaincy General of Cuba and New Philippines

In London, Parliament debated the merits of meeting the demands made by the colonies; however, it took no official notice of Congress's petitions and addresses. On November 30, 1774, King George III opened Parliament with a speech condemning Massachusetts and the Suffolk Resolves, prompting the Continental Congress to convene again.

The Second Continental Congress convened on May 10, 1775, at Pennsylvania's State House in Philadelphia shortly after the start of the Revolutionary War. Initially, it functioned as a de facto common government by raising armies, directing strategy, appointing diplomats, and making formal treaties. The Thirteen Colonies were represented when in the following year it adopted a resolution for independence on July 2, 1776, and two days later approved the Declaration of Independence. Thomas Jefferson drafted the declaration, and John Adams was a leader in the debates in favor of its adoption. Afterward, the Congress functioned as the provisional government of the United States of America through March 1, 1781.

To govern the war effort and to foster unity among the states, Congress created various standing committees to handle war-related activities, such as the committee of secret correspondence, the treasury board, the board of war and ordnance, and the navy board. Much work was also done in small ad hoc committees. One such small group was tasked with developing a constitution to perpetuate the new Union. Such an agreement, the Articles of Confederation was approved by Congress on November 15, 1777, and sent to the states for ratification.

== Confederation Congress ==
The Articles of Confederation came into force on March 1, 1781, after being ratified by all Thirteen Colonies, and the Second Continental Congress became the Congress of the Confederation, which was officially styled as the "United States in Congress Assembled", a unicameral body composed of delegates from the several states. A guiding principle of the Articles was to preserve the independence and sovereignty of the states. The weak central government established by the Articles received only those powers which the former colonies had recognized as belonging to king and parliament. Congress had the power to declare war, sign treaties, and settle disputes between the states. It could also borrow or print money, but did not have the power to tax. It helped guide the United States through the final stages of the Revolutionary War, but steeply declined in authority afterward.

During peacetime, there were two important, long-lasting acts of the Confederation Congress:

1. The passage of the Northwest Ordinance in 1787. This ordinance accepted the abolition of all claims to the land west of Pennsylvania and north of the Ohio River by the states of Pennsylvania, Virginia, New York, Connecticut, and Massachusetts, and the ordinance established U.S. federal governmental control over all of this land in the Northwest Territory with the goal of inspiring the creation of several new states there. In the course of time, this land was divided over the course of many decades into the states of present-day Ohio, Michigan, Indiana, Illinois, Wisconsin, and part of Minnesota.
2. After years of frustration, an agreement was reached in 1786 at the Annapolis Convention to call another convention in May 1787 in Philadelphia with the mission of writing and proposing several amendments to the Articles of Confederation to improve the form of government. The report was sent to the Confederation Congress and the States. The result was the Philadelphia Convention of 1787, which was authorized by all the States thus fulfilling the unanimous requirement of the Articles of Confederation to allow changes to the Articles.

Under the Articles of Confederation, the Confederation Congress had little power to compel the individual states to comply with its decisions. More and more prospective delegates elected to the Confederation Congress declined to serve in it. The leading men in each State preferred to serve in the state governments, and thus the Continental Congress had frequent difficulties in establishing a quorum. This divide made the colonies weak and the purpose of the congress was to make them stronger. When the Articles of Confederation were superseded by the Constitution of the United States, the Confederation Congress was superseded by the United States Congress.

The Confederation Congress ultimately established a suitable administrative structure for the Federal government, which placed into operation a federal government comprising three departments (finance, war, and foreign affairs), led by three ministers for each respective department. Robert Morris was selected as the new Superintendent of Finance, and then Morris secured a loan from the French government to deal with his empty treasury and also runaway inflation, for a number of years, in the supply of paper money.

As the ambassador to France, Benjamin Franklin secured the loan for a common budget, and also persuaded France to send an army of about 6,000 soldiers to the United States and to dispatch a large squadron of French warships under Comte de Grasse to the coasts of Virginia and North Carolina. These French warships were decisive at the Battle of Yorktown along the coast of Virginia by preventing Lord Cornwallis's British troops from receiving supplies, reinforcements, or evacuation via the James River and Hampton Roads.

Robert Morris, the Minister of Finance, persuaded Congress to charter the Bank of North America on December 31, 1781. Although a private bank, the Federal Government acquired partial ownership with money lent by France. The Bank of North America played a major role in financing the war against Great Britain. The combined armies of George Washington and Nathanael Greene, with the help of the French Army and Navy, defeated the British in the Battle of Yorktown during October 1781. Lord Cornwallis was forced to sue for peace and to surrender his entire army to General Washington.

During 1783, the Americans secured the official recognition of the independence of the United States from Great Britain following negotiations with British diplomats in Paris, which culminated with the signing of the Treaty of Paris on September 3, 1783. The Treaty of Paris was later ratified by the British Parliament.

== Organization ==
Both the British Parliament and many of their own colonial assemblies had powerful speakers of the house and standing committees with strong chairmen, with executive power held by the British Monarch or the colonial Governor. However, the organization of the Continental Congress was based less on the British Parliament or on local colonial assemblies than on the 1765 Stamp Act Congress. Nine delegates to that congress were in attendance at the First Congress in 1774, and their perspective on governance influenced the direction of both the Continental Congresses and the later Confederation Congress. Congress took on powers normally held by the British King-in-Council, such as foreign and military affairs. However, the right to tax and regulate trade was reserved for the states, not Congress. Congress had no formal way to enforce its ordinances on the state governments. Delegates were responsible to and reported directly to their home state assemblies; an organizational structure that Neil Olsen has described as "an extreme form of matrix management".

Delegates chose a presiding president to monitor the debate, maintain order, and make sure journals were kept and documents and letters were published and delivered. After the colonies declared their independence in 1776 and united as a quasi-federation to fight for their freedom, the president functioned as head of state (not of the country, but of its central government). Otherwise, the office was "more honorable than powerful". Congress also elected a secretary, scribe, doorman, messenger, and Chaplain.

The rules of Congress guaranteed the right to debate and open access to the floor for each delegate. Additionally, to ensure that each state would be on an equal footing with the others, voting on ordinances was done en bloc, with each state having a single vote. Prior to casting its yay or nay vote, preliminary votes were taken within each state delegation. The majority vote determined here was considered the vote of the state on the motion; in cases of a tie the vote for the state was marked as divided, and was not counted.

Turnover of delegates was high, with an average year-to-year turnover rate of 37% by one calculation, and 39% by session-to-session. Of the 343 serving delegates, only 55% (187 delegates) spent 12 or more months in attendance. Only 25 of the delegates served longer than 35 months. This high rate of turnover was not just a characteristic, it was due to a deliberate policy of term limits. In the Confederation phase of the Congress, "no delegate was permitted to serve more than three years in any six". Attendance was variable: while in session, between 54 and 22 delegates were in attendance at any one time, with an average of only 35.5 members attending between 1774 and 1788.

== Legacy ==
There is a long-running debate on how effective the Congress was as an organization. The first critic may have been General George Washington. In an address to his officers, at Newburgh, New York, on March 15, 1783, responding to complaints that Congress had not funded their pay and pensions, he stated that he believed that Congress would do the army "complete justice" and eventually pay the soldiers. "But, like all other large Bodies, where there is a variety of different Interests to reconcile, their deliberations are slow."

In addition to their slowness, the lack of coercive power in the Continental Congress was harshly criticized by James Madison when arguing for the need of a Federal Constitution. His comment in Vices of the Political System of April 1787 set the conventional wisdom on the historical legacy of the institution for centuries to come:

A sanction is essential to the idea of law, as coercion is to that of Government. The federal system being destitute of both, wants the great vital principles of a Political Cons[ti]tution. Under the form of such a Constitution, it is in fact nothing more than a treaty of amity of commerce and of alliance, between so many independent and Sovereign States. From what cause could so fatal an omission have happened in the Articles of Confederation? From a mistaken confidence that the justice, the good faith, the honor, the sound policy, of the several legislative assemblies would render superfluous any appeal to the ordinary motives by which the laws secure the obedience of individuals: a confidence which does honor to the enthusiastic virtue of the compilers, as much as the inexperience of the crisis apologizes for their errors.

— James Madison, Vices of the Political System

Political scientists Calvin Jillson and Rick Wilson in the 1980s accepted the conventional interpretation on the weakness of the Congress due to the lack of coercive power. They explored the role of leadership, or rather the lack of it, in the Continental Congress. Going beyond even Madison's harsh critique, they used the "analytical stance of what has come to be called the new institutionalism" to demonstrate that "the norms, rules, and institutional structures of the Continental Congress" were equally to blame "for the institution's eventual failure", and that the "institutional structure worked against, rather than with, the delegates in tackling the crucial issues of the day."

Historian Richard P. McCormick suggested that Madison's "extreme judgment" on the Congress was "motivated no doubt by Madison's overriding desire to create a new central government that would be empowered to veto the acts of state legislatures," but that it fails "to take any notice of the fact that while the authority of the Confederation Congress was ambiguous, it was not a nullity".

Benjamin Irvin in his social and cultural history of the Continental Congress, praised "the invented traditions by which Congress endeavored to fortify the resistance movement and to make meaning of American independence." But he noted that after the war's end, "Rather than passively adopting the Congress's creations, the American people embraced, rejected, reworked, ridiculed, or simply ignored them as they saw fit."

An organizational culture analysis of the Continental Congress by Neil Olsen, looking for the values, norms, and underlying assumptions that drive an organization's decisions, noted that "the leaderless Continental Congress outperformed not only the modern congress run by powerful partisan hierarchies, but modern government and corporate entities, for all their coercive power and vaunted skills as 'leaders'." Looking at their mission as defined by state resolutions and petitions entered into the Congressional Journal on its first day, it found that on the common issues of the relief of Boston, securing Colonial rights, eventually restoring harmonious relations with Great Britain, and repealing taxes, they overachieved their mission goals, defeated the largest army and navy in the world, and created two new types of republic. Olsen suggests that the Congress, if slow, when judged by its many achievements – not the least being recognizing its flaws, then replacing and terminating itself – was a success.

== Timeline ==
=== First and Second Continental Congress ===
1774

- September 5: First Continental Congress convenes at Philadelphia's Carpenter's Hall
- October 14: Declaration and Resolves of the First Continental Congress is adopted
- October 18: Continental Association is adopted
- October 25: First Petition to the King is signed
- October 26: Congress adjourns, resolving to reconvene the following May if grievances were not redressed

1775

- April 19: War begins at the Battles of Lexington and Concord
- May 10: Second Continental Congress convenes at Philadelphia's State House
- June 14: Congress establishes the Continental Army
- June 15: Congress appoints one of its members, George Washington, as commander of the Continental Army
- July 1: King George III addresses Parliament, stating they will "put a speedy end" to the rebellion
- July 6: Declaration of the Causes and Necessity of Taking Up Arms is approved
- July 8: Second petition to the king (the Olive Branch Petition) is signed and sent to London
- August 23: In his Proclamation of Rebellion (officially titled "A Proclamation for Suppressing Rebellion and Sedition"), King George III declares elements of the American colonies in "open and avowed rebellion" and orders officials of the British Empire "to use their utmost endeavours to withstand and suppress such rebellion"
- October 13: Congress establishes the Continental Navy
- November 10: Congress establishes the Continental Marines

1776

- January 10: Thomas Paine publishes Common Sense
- June 7: Richard Henry Lee of Virginia presents a three-part resolution to Congress, calling on Congress to declare independence, form foreign alliances, and prepare a plan of colonial confederation
- June 10: Congress votes on June 10 to postpone further discussion of Lee's resolution for three weeks to allow time for the delegates to confer with their state assemblies
- June 11: Congress appoints a "Committee of Five", Thomas Jefferson of Virginia, John Adams of Massachusetts, Benjamin Franklin of Pennsylvania, Roger Sherman of Connecticut and Robert R. Livingston of New York, to draft a declaration justifying independence.
- June 12: Congress appoints a Committee of Thirteen to draft of a constitution for a union of the states
- July 2: Lee Resolution (also known as "The Resolution for Independence"), asserting the independence of the 13 colonies from Great Britain, is adopted
- July 4: Final text of the Declaration of Independence is adopted
- July 12: John Dickinson presents the Committee of Thirteen's draft constitution to Congress
- August 2: Delegates sign an engrossed copy of the Declaration of Independence
- December 12: Congress adjourns to move to Baltimore, Maryland
- December 20: Congress convenes in Baltimore at the Henry Fite House

1777

- February 27: Congress adjourns to return to Philadelphia
- March 4: Congress reconvenes at Philadelphia's State House
- June 14: Flag Resolution, defining the design of the flag of the United States of America, is adopted
- September 18: Congress adjourns in order to move to Lancaster, Pennsylvania
- September 27: Congress convenes for one day in Lancaster, at the Court House
- September 30: Congress reconvenes at York, Pennsylvania at the Court House
- November 15: Final text of the Articles of Confederation is approved and sent to the states for ratification

1778

- June 27: Congress adjourns to return to Philadelphia
- July 2: Congress reconvenes in Philadelphia, first at College Hall, then at the State House

1780

- January 15: Congress establishes the Court of Appeals in Cases of Capture

=== Confederation Congress ===
1781

- March 1: Having been ratified by all 13 states, the Articles of Confederation becomes effective; Continental Congress becomes the Congress of the Confederation
- May 26: Proposed plan from Robert Morris to establish Bank of North America approved by Congress
- October 17: Surrender of Cornwallis at Yorktown, Virginia
- December 31: Bank of North America chartered by Congress

1783

- June 21: The Pennsylvania Mutiny of 1783 forces congress to flee Philadelphia.
- June 30: Congress reconvenes in Princeton, New Jersey, first at a house named "Prospect", then Nassau Hall
- November 4: Congress adjourns to move to Annapolis, Maryland
- November 26: Congress reconvenes at Annapolis, in the State House
- December 23: George Washington resigns from the Army

1784

- January 14: The Treaty of Paris is ratified
- May 7: Thomas Jefferson is appointed as a minister to France
- August 19: Congress adjourns to move to Trenton, New Jersey
- November 1: Congress reconvenes at Trenton, at the French Arms Tavern
- December 24: Congress adjourns to move to New York City

1785

- January 11: Congress reconvenes in New York City, first at City Hall, then at Fraunces Tavern
- March 25–28: Maryland–Virginia Conference held at Mount Vernon
- March 28: Mount Vernon Compact is signed between Maryland and Virginia covering the use of the Potomac River

1786

- August 29: Shays' Rebellion begins
- September 11–14: 1786 Annapolis Convention held; delegates issues a report calling for another meeting in the spring with delegates from all states

1787

- February 21: Congress calls a constitutional convention "for the sole and express purpose of revising the Articles of Confederation and reporting to Congress and the several legislatures such alterations and provisions therein and when agreed to in Congress and confirmed by the States render the Federal Constitution adequate to the exigencies of Government and the preservation of the Union"
- May 25: Constitutional Convention convenes in Philadelphia; every state except for Rhode Island sends delegates
- July 13: Congress passes the Northwest Ordinance
- September 17: Constitutional Convention adjourns after completing work on the United States Constitution
- September 28: Congress votes to transmit the proposed Constitution to the 13 states for ratification

1788

- July 2: Congress President Cyrus Griffin informs Congress that New Hampshire has ratified the Constitution and notes that it is the ninth ratification, thereby allowing for the establishment of the new government
- July 8: A committee is formed to examine all ratifications received and to develop a plan for putting the new Constitution into operation.
- September 13: Congress certifies that the new constitution has been duly ratified and sets date for first meeting of the new federal government and the presidential election
- October 10: The last session during which the Continental Congress succeeded in achieving a quorum; and passes its last ordinance
- November 15: Cyrus Griffin, the 10th president of Congress under the Articles of Confederation, resigns

1789

- March 2: Last meeting of the Continental Congress, held at Fraunces Tavern, is adjourned sine die; Philip Pell is the only member in attendance
- March 4: First session of the 1st United States Congress begins at Federal Hall
- April 30: George Washington inaugurated as first President of the United States
- July 23: Charles Thomson transmits to President Washington his resignation of the office of Secretary of Congress
- July 25: In accordance with President Washington's directions, "the books, records, and papers of the late Congress, the Great Seal of the Federal Union, and the Seal of the Admiralty" are delivered over to Roger Alden, deputy secretary of the new Congress, who had been designated by President Washington as custodian for the time being

1790

- Continental Congress declines and the First United States Congress arises

== See also ==
- American Revolution
- American Revolutionary War
- Confederation Period
- Founding Fathers of the United States
- Journals of the Continental Congress
- List of delegates to the Continental Congress
- State cessions
- Timeline of drafting and ratification of the United States Constitution
- Connecticut Compromise
