= Confederation period =

Era of United States history in the 1780s

- 1781–1789
American Revolution	Federalist Era
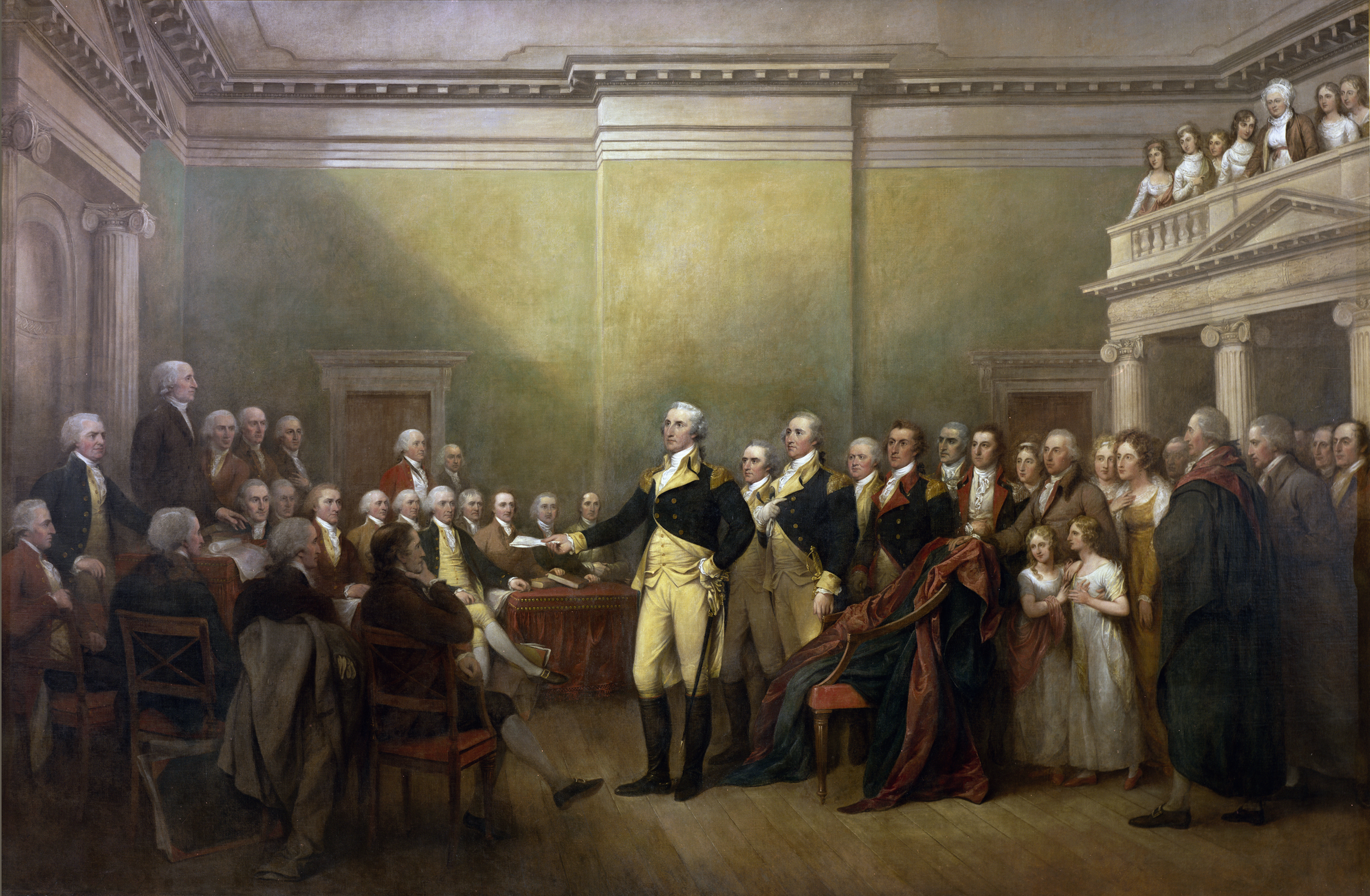
- General George Washington Resigning His Commission by John Trumbull, 1824
- Location: United States
- Leader(s): Samuel Huntington; Thomas McKean; John Hanson; Elias Boudinot; Thomas Mifflin; Richard Henry Lee; John Hancock; Nathaniel Gorham; Arthur St. Clair; Cyrus Griffin
- Key events: Articles of Confederation; Siege of Yorktown; Philadelphia Mutiny; Treaty of Paris; Constitutional Convention; Ratification of the Constitution

The Confederation period was the era of the United States' history in the 1780s after the American Revolution and prior to the ratification of the United States Constitution. In 1781, the United States ratified the Articles of Confederation and Perpetual Union and prevailed in the siege of Yorktown, the last major battle between British and American forces in the American Revolutionary War. American independence was confirmed with the 1783 signing of the Treaty of Paris. The fledgling United States faced several challenges, many of which stemmed from the lack of an effective central government and unified political culture. The period ended in 1789 following the ratification of the United States Constitution, which established a new, more effective, federal government.

The Articles of Confederation established a loose confederation of states with a weak confederated government. An assembly of delegates acted on behalf of the states they represented. This unicameral body, officially referred to as the United States in Congress Assembled, had little authority, and could not accomplish anything independent of the states. It had no chief executive, and no court system. Congress lacked the power to levy taxes, regulate foreign or interstate commerce, or effectively negotiate with foreign powers. The weakness of Congress proved self-reinforcing, as the leading political figures of the day served in state governments or foreign posts. The failure of the confederated government to handle the challenges facing the United States led to calls for reform and frequent talk of secession.

The Treaty of Paris left the United States with a vast territory spanning from the Atlantic Ocean to the Mississippi River. Settlement of the trans-Appalachian territories proved difficult, in part due to the resistance of Native Americans and the neighboring foreign powers of Great Britain and Spain. The British refused to evacuate their forts in US territory, while the Spanish used their control of the Mississippi River to stymie Western settlement. In 1787, Congress passed the Northwest Ordinance, which set an important precedent by establishing the first organized territory under the control of the confederated government.

After Congressional efforts to amend the Articles failed, numerous American leaders met in Philadelphia in 1787 to establish a new constitution. The new constitution was ratified in 1788, and the new federal government began meeting in 1789, marking the end of the Confederation period.

== Background ==
=== Independence and self-government ===
The American Revolutionary War broke out in April 1775 with the Battles of Lexington and Concord. The Second Continental Congress met in May 1775, and established an army funded by Congress and under the leadership of George Washington, a Virginian who had fought in the French and Indian War. On July 4, 1776, as the war continued and two days after endorsing the Lee Resolution to break from British control, Congress adopted the Declaration of Independence. At exactly the same time that Congress declared independence, it also created a committee to craft a constitution for the new nation. Though some in Congress hoped for a strong centralized state, most Americans wanted legislative power to rest primarily with the states and saw the central government as a mere wartime necessity. The resulting constitution, which came to be known as the Articles of Confederation and Perpetual Union, provided for a weak central government with little power to coerce the state governments. The first article of the new constitution established a name for the new confederation – the United States of America.

The first draft of the Articles of Confederation, written by John Dickinson, was presented to Congress on July 12, 1776, but Congress did not send the proposed constitution to the states until November 1777. Three major constitutional issues divided Congress: state borders, including claims to lands west of the Appalachian Mountains, state representation in the new Congress, and whether tax levies on states should take slaves into account. Ultimately, Congress decided that each state would have one vote in Congress and that slaves would not affect state levies. By 1780, as the war continued, every state but Maryland had ratified the Articles; Maryland refused to ratify the constitution until all of the other states relinquished their western land claims to Congress. The success of Britain's Southern strategy, along with pressure from America's French allies, convinced Virginia to cede its claims north of the Ohio River, and Maryland finally ratified the Articles in January 1781. The new constitution took effect in March 1781 and the Congress of the Confederation technically replaced the Second Continental Congress as the central government, but in practice the structure and personnel of the new Congress was quite similar to that of the old Congress.

=== End of the American Revolution ===
After the Franco-American victory at the siege of Yorktown in September 1781 and the collapse of British Prime Minister North's ministry in March 1782, both sides sought a peace agreement. The American Revolutionary War ended with the signing of the 1783 Treaty of Paris. The treaty granted the United States independence, as well as control of a vast region south of the Great Lakes and extending from the Appalachian Mountains west to the Mississippi River. Although the British Parliament had attached this trans-Appalachian region to Quebec in 1774 as part of the Quebec Act, several states had land claims in region based on royal charters and proclamations that defined their boundaries as stretching "from sea to sea." Some Americans had hoped the treaty would provide for the acquisition of Florida, but that territory was restored to Spain, which had joined the U.S. and France in the war against Britain and demanded its spoils. The British fought hard and successfully to keep the colonies that later united as Canada, so the treaty acknowledged that.

Observers at the time and historians ever since emphasize the generosity of British territorial concessions. Historians such as Alvord, Harlow, and Ritcheson have emphasized that Britain's generous territorial terms were based on a statesmanlike vision of close economic ties between Britain and the United States. The treaty was designed to facilitate the growth of the American population and create lucrative markets for British merchants, without any military or administrative costs to Britain. As the French foreign minister Vergennes later put it, "The English buy peace rather than make it".

The treaty also addressed several additional issues. The United States agreed to honor debts incurred prior to 1775, while the British agreed to remove their soldiers from American soil. Privileges that the Americans had received because of their membership in the British Empire no longer applied, most notably protection from pirates in the Mediterranean Sea. Neither the Americans nor the British would consistently honor these additional clauses. Individual states ignored treaty obligations by refusing to restore confiscated Loyalist property, and many continued to confiscate Loyalist property for "unpaid debts". Some states, notably Virginia, maintained laws against payment of debts to British creditors. The British often ignored the provision of Article 7 regarding removal of slaves.

== American leadership ==
Article II of the Articles of Confederation

"Each state retains its sovereignty, freedom, and independence, and every power, jurisdiction, and right, which is not by this Confederation expressly delegated to the United States, in Congress assembled."

The Articles of Confederation created a loose union of states. The confederation's central government consisted of a unicameral Congress with legislative and executive function, and was composed of delegates from each state in the union. Congress received only those powers which the states had previously recognized as belonging to king and parliament. Each state had one vote in Congress, regardless of its size or population, and any act of Congress required the votes of nine of the 13 states to pass; any decision to amend the Articles required the unanimous consent of the states. Each state's legislature appointed multiple members to its delegation, allowing delegates to return to their homes without leaving their state unrepresented. Under the Articles, states were forbidden from negotiating with other nations or maintaining a military without Congress's consent, but almost all other powers were reserved for the states. Congress lacked the power to raise revenue, and was incapable of enforcing its own legislation and instructions. As such, Congress was heavily reliant on the compliance and support of the states.

Following the conclusion of the Revolutionary War, which had provided the original impetus for the Articles, Congress's ability to accomplish anything of material consequence declined significantly. Rarely did more than half of the roughly sixty delegates attend a session of Congress at any given time, causing difficulties in raising a quorum. Many of the most prominent American leaders, such as Washington, John Adams, John Hancock, and Benjamin Franklin, retired from public life, served as foreign delegates, or held office in state governments. One leader who did emerge during this period was James Madison, who became convinced of the need for a stronger central government after serving in the Congress of the Confederation from 1781 to 1783. He would continue to call for a stronger central government for the remainder of the 1780s. Congress met in Philadelphia from 1778 until June 1783, when it moved to Princeton, New Jersey, due to the Pennsylvania Mutiny of 1783. Congress would also convene in Annapolis, Maryland, and Trenton, New Jersey, before settling in New York City in 1785. The lack of strong leaders in Congress, as well as the body's impotence and itinerant nature, embarrassed and frustrated many American federalists, including Washington. The weakness of Congress also led to frequent talk of secession, and many believed that the United States would break into four confederacies, consisting of New England, the Mid-Atlantic states, the Southern states, and the trans-Appalachian region, respectively.

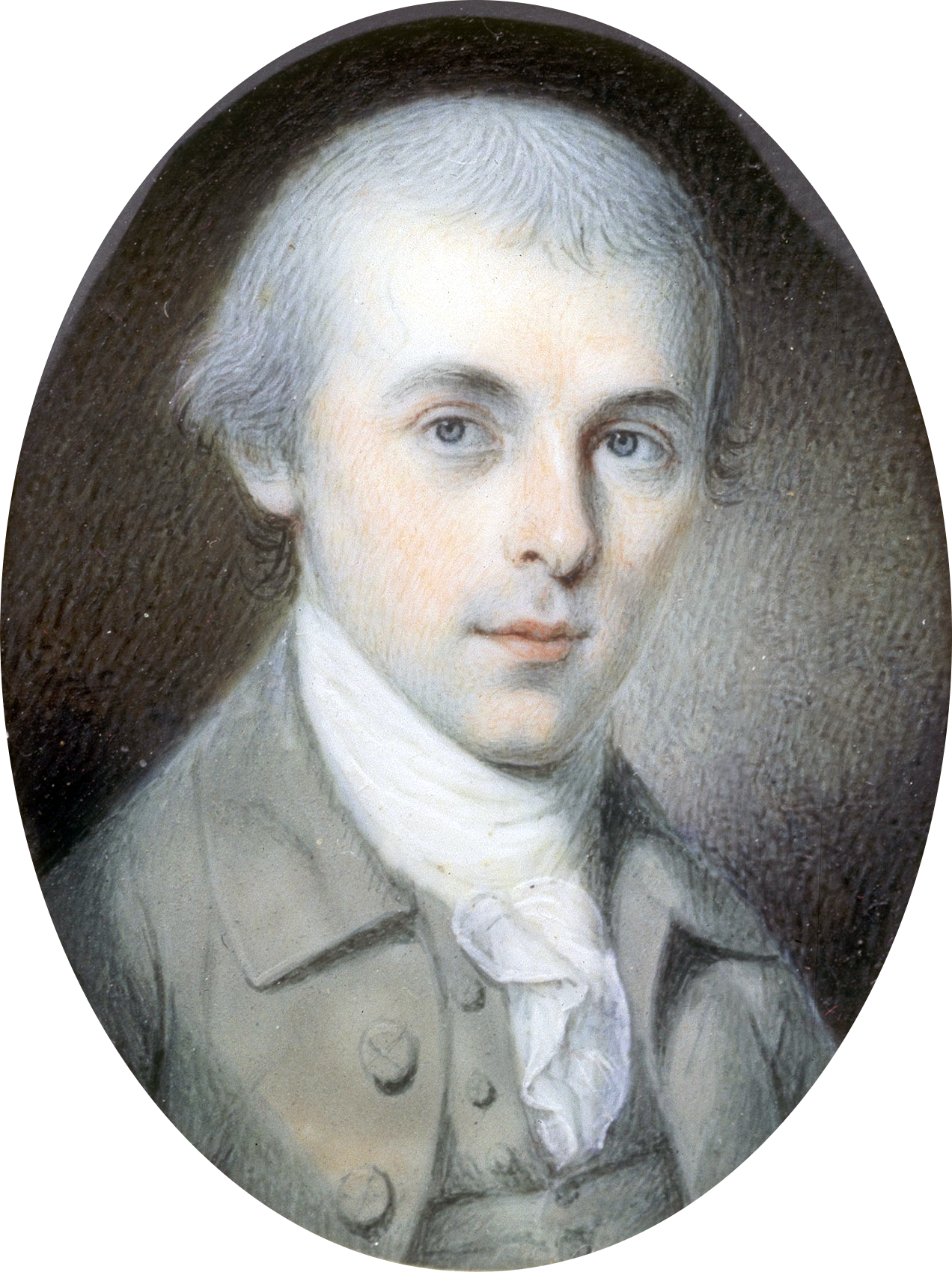
James Madison emerged as an important leader while serving in the Congress of the Confederation.

The Congress of the Confederation was the sole federal governmental body created by the Articles of Confederation, but Congress established other bodies to undertake executive and judicial functions. In 1780, Congress created the Court of Appeals in Cases of Capture, which acted as the lone federal court during the Confederation period. In early 1781, Congress created executive departments to handle Foreign Affairs, War, and Finance. A fourth department, the Post Office Department, had existed since 1775 and continued to function under the Articles. Congress also authorized the creation of a Marine Department, but chose to place the naval forces under the Finance Department after Alexander McDougall declined to lead the Marine Department. The four departments were charged with administering the federal civil service, but they had little power independent of Congress. Pennsylvania merchant Robert Morris served as the Superintendent of Finance from 1781 to 1784. Though Morris had become somewhat unpopular during the war due to his successful business ventures, Congress hoped that he would be able to ameliorate the country's ruinous financial state. After his proposals were blocked, Morris resigned in frustration in 1784, and was succeeded by a three-person Treasury Board. Benjamin Lincoln served as Secretary of War from 1781 until the end of the Revolutionary War in 1783. He was eventually succeeded by Henry Knox, who held the position from 1785 to 1789. Robert Livingston served as the Secretary of Foreign Affairs from 1781 to 1783, and he was followed in office by John Jay, who served from 1784 to 1789. Jay proved to be an able administrator, and he took control of the nation's diplomacy during his time in office. Ebenezer Hazard served as the United States Postmaster General from 1782 to 1789.

== State governments ==
Population by state in the 1790 Census
State	Tot. pop.	Enslaved pop.	Free pop.
Connecticut	237,946	2,764	235,182
Delaware	59,096	8,887	50,209
Georgia	82,548	29,264	53,284
Maryland	319,728	103,036	216,692
Massachusetts (including Maine)	475,327	0	475,327
New Hampshire	141,885	158	141,727
New Jersey	184,139	11,423	172,716
New York (including Vermont)	425,545	21,324	404,221
North Carolina (including Tennessee)	429,442	103,989	325,453
Pennsylvania	434,373	3,737	430,636
Rhode Island	68,825	948	67,877
South Carolina	249,073	107,094	141,979
Virginia (including Kentucky)	821,287	305,057	516,230
Total	3,929,214	697,681	3,231,533

After the thirteen colonies declared their independence and sovereignty in 1776, each was faced with the task of replacing royal authority with institutions based on popular rule. To varying degrees, the states embraced egalitarianism during and after the war. Each state wrote a new constitution, all of which established an elected executive, and many of which greatly expanded the franchise. Historian John E. Ferling considers the Pennsylvania Constitution of 1776 the most democratic of these constitutions, as it granted suffrage to all taxpaying male citizens. Many of the new constitutions included a bill of rights that guaranteed freedom of the press, freedom of speech, trial by jury, and other freedoms. Conservative patriots such as Oliver Wolcott, who had fought for independence from Britain but did not favor major changes to the social order, looked with alarm on the new influence of the lower classes and the rise of politicians independent from the upper class.

Following the end of the Revolutionary War, the states embarked on various reforms. Several states enshrined freedom of religion in their constitutions, and every Southern state ended the Anglican Church's status as the state religion. Several states established state universities, while private universities also flourished. Numerous states reformed their criminal codes to reduce the number of capital crimes. Northern states invested in infrastructure projects, including roads and canals that provided access to Western settlements. The states also took action regarding slavery, which appeared increasingly hypocritical to a generation that had fought against what they saw as tyranny. During and after the Revolution, every Northern state either passed laws or experienced court decisions providing for gradual emancipation or the immediate abolition of slavery. Though no Southern states provided for emancipation, they did pass laws restricting the slave trade.

The states continued to carry the burden of heavy debt loads acquired during the Revolutionary War. With the partial exceptions of New York and Pennsylvania, which received revenue from import duties, most states relied on individual and property taxes for revenue. To cope with the war-time debts, several states were forced to raise taxes to a level several times higher than it had been prior to the war. These taxes sparked anger among the populace, particularly in rural areas, and in Massachusetts led to an armed uprising known as Shays' Rebellion. As both Congress and the government of Massachusetts proved unable to suppress the rebellion, former Secretary of War Benjamin Lincoln raised a private army which put an end to the insurgency.

Britain relinquished its claim to Vermont in the Treaty of Paris, but Vermont did not join the United States. Though most in Vermont wanted to become the fourteenth state, New York and New Hampshire, which both claimed parts of Vermont, blocked this ambition. Throughout the 1780s, Vermont acted as an independent state, known as the Vermont Republic.

== Fiscal policies ==
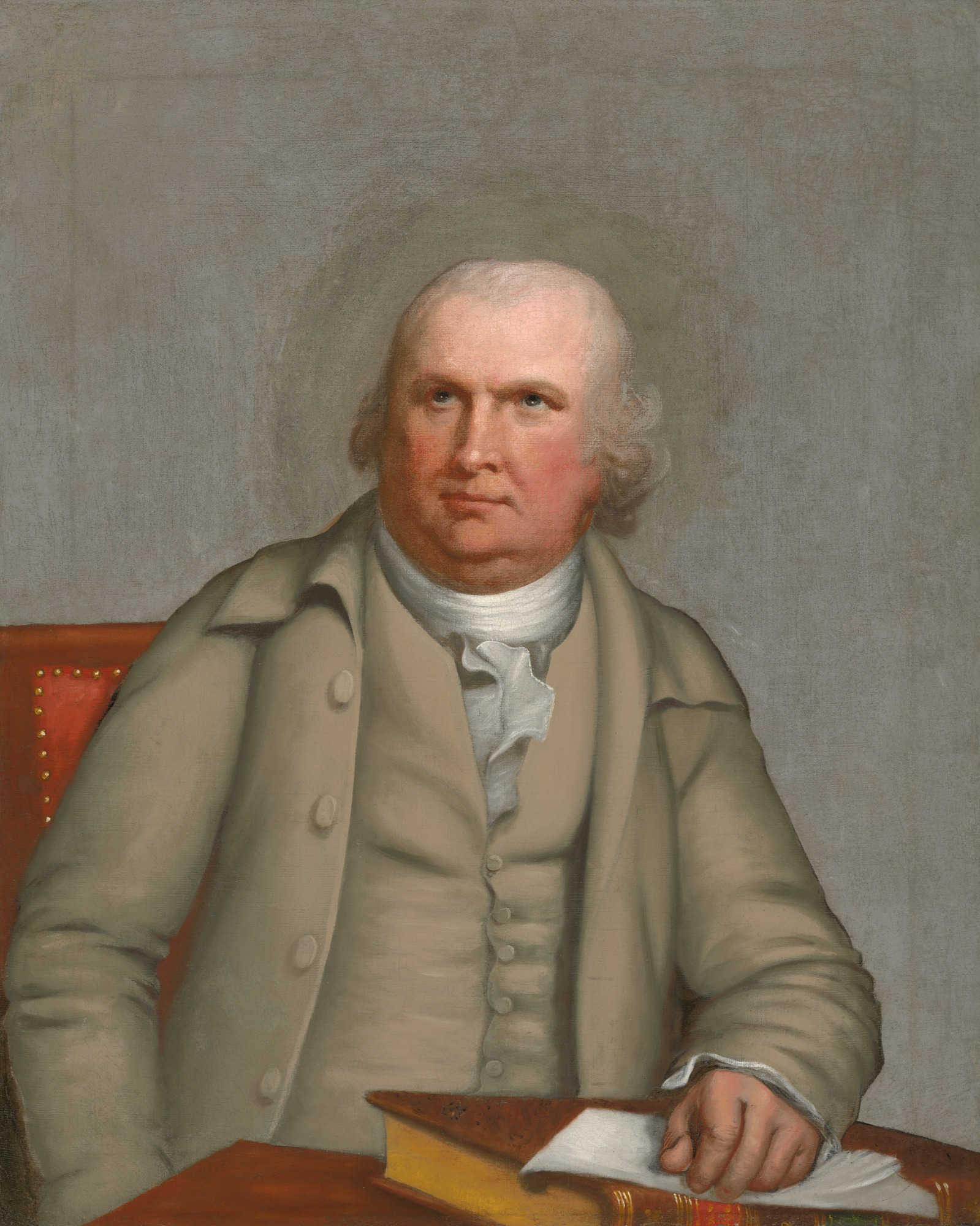
Robert Morris served as Superintendent of Finance from 1781 to 1784.

The United States had acquired huge debts during the Revolutionary War, in part due to Congress's lack of taxation powers; under the Articles, only the states could levy taxes or regulate commerce. In 1779, Congress had relinquished most of its economic power to the states, as it stopped printing currency and requested that the states directly pay the soldiers, but the states also suffered from fiscal instability. Robert Morris, appointed as superintendent of finance in 1781, won passage of major centralizing reforms such as the partial assumption of state debt, the suspension of payments to military personnel, and the creation of the Bank of North America. Morris emerged as perhaps the most powerful individual in the central government, with some referring to him as "The Financier", or even "The Dictator". In 1783, Morris, with the support of congressmen such as Madison and Alexander Hamilton, won congressional approval of a five percent levy on imports, which would grant the central government a consistent and independent source of revenue. However, with the signing of the Treaty of Paris, the states became more resistant to granting power to Congress. Though all but two states approved the levy, it never won the unanimous backing of the states and thus Congress struggled to find revenue throughout the 1780s.

== Common defense ==
As the Revolutionary War came to an end, the officers and enlisted men of the Continental Army became increasingly disgruntled over their lack of pay, as Congress had suspended payment due to the poor financial state of the central government. Congress had promised the officers a lifetime pension in 1780, but few of the officers believed that they would receive this benefit. In December 1782, several officers, led by Alexander McDougall, petitioned Congress for their benefits. The officers hoped to use their influence to force the states to allow the federal government to levy a tariff, which in turn would provide revenue to pay the soldiers. Historians such as Robert Middlekauff have argued that some members of the central government, including Congressman Alexander Hamilton and Superintendent of Finance Robert Morris, attempted to use this growing dissatisfaction to increase the power of Congress. An anonymous letter circulated among the officers; the document called for the payment of soldiers and threatened mutiny against General Washington and Congress. In a gathering of army officers in March 1783, Washington denounced the letter, but promised to lobby Congress for payment. Washington's speech defused the brewing Newburgh Conspiracy, named for the New York town in which the army was encamped, but dissatisfaction among the soldiers remained high. In May 1783, fearing a mutiny, Washington furloughed most of his army.

After Congress failed to pass an amendment granting the central government the power to levy an impost on imports, Morris paid the army with certificates that the soldiers labeled "Morris notes". The notes promised to pay the soldiers in six months, but few of the soldiers believed that they would ever actually receive payment, and most Morris notes were sold to speculators. Many of the impoverished enlisted men were forced to beg for help on their journeys home. In June, the Pennsylvania Mutiny of 1783 broke out among angry soldiers who demanded payment, causing Congress to relocate the capital to Princeton. Upon re-convening, Congress reduced the size of the army from 11,000 to 2,000. Though security was a top priority of American leaders, in the short term a smaller Continental Army would suffice because Americans had confidence that the Atlantic Ocean would provide protection from European powers. On December 23, 1783, Washington resigned from the army, earning the admiration of many for his willingness to relinquish power.

In August 1784, Congress established the First American Regiment, the nation's first peacetime regular army infantry unit, which served primarily on the American frontier. Even so, the size of the army continued to shrink, down to a mere 625 soldiers, while Congress effectively disbanded the Continental Navy in 1785 with the sale of the USS Alliance. The small, poorly equipped army would prove powerless to prevent squatters from moving onto Native American lands, further inflaming a tense situation on the frontier.

== Western settlement ==
Partly due to the restrictions imposed by the Royal Proclamation of 1763, only a handful of Americans had settled west of the Appalachian Mountains prior to the outbreak of the American Revolutionary War. The start of that war lifted the barrier to settlement, and by 1782 approximately 25,000 Americans had settled in Transappalachia. After the war, American settlement in the region continued. Though life in these new lands proved hard for many, western settlement offered the prize of property, an unrealistic aspiration for some in the East. Westward expansion stirred enthusiasm even in those who did not move west, and many leading Americans, including Washington, Benjamin Franklin, and John Jay, purchased lands in the west. Land speculators founded groups like the Ohio Company, which acquired title to vast tracts of land in the west and often came into conflict with settlers. Washington and others co-founded the Potomac Company to build a canal linking the Potomac River with the Ohio River. Washington hoped that this canal would provide a cultural and economic link between the east and west, thus ensuring that the West would not ultimately secede.

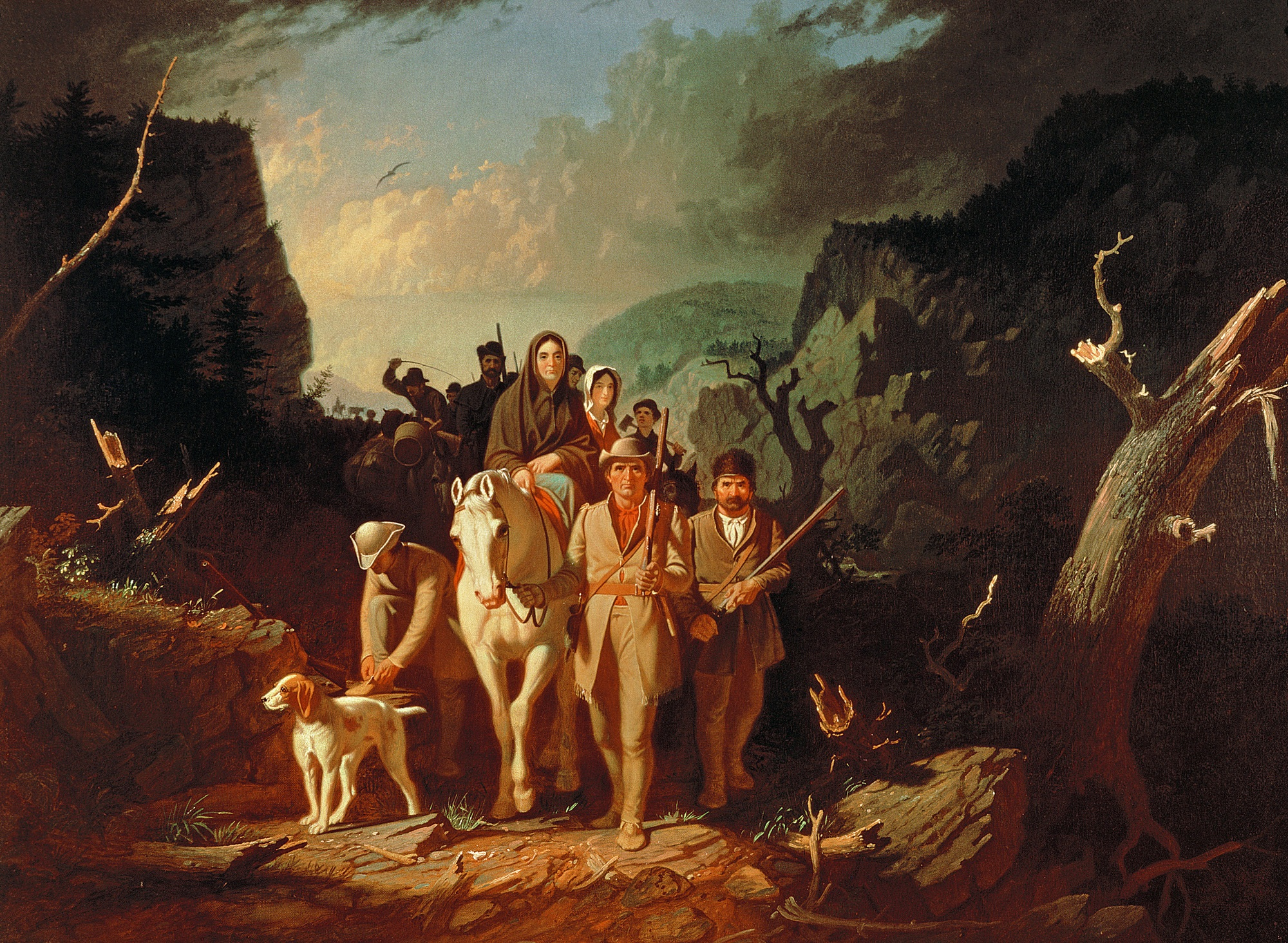
George Caleb Bingham's 1851–52 Daniel Boone Escorting Settlers through the Cumberland Gap depicts the early settlement of Kentucky

In 1784, Virginia formally ceded its claims north of the Ohio River, and Congress created a government for the region now known as the Old Northwest with the Land Ordinance of 1784 and the Land Ordinance of 1785. These laws established the principle that Old Northwest would be governed by a territorial government, under the aegis of Congress, until it reached a certain level of political and economic development. At that point, the former territories would enter the union as states, with rights equal to that of any other state. The federal territory stretched across most of the area west of Pennsylvania and north of the Ohio River, though Connecticut retained a small part of its claim in the West in the form of the Connecticut Western Reserve, a strip of land south of Lake Erie. In 1787, Congress passed the Northwest Ordinance, which granted Congress greater control of the region by establishing the Northwest Territory. Under the new arrangement, many of the formerly elected officials of the territory were instead appointed by Congress. In order to attract Northern settlers, Congress outlawed slavery in the Northwest Territory, though it also passed a fugitive slave law to appease the Southern states.

While the Old Northwest fell under the control of the federal government, Georgia, North Carolina, and Virginia retained control of the Old Southwest; each state claimed to extend west to the Mississippi River. In 1784, settlers in western North Carolina sought statehood as the State of Franklin, but their efforts were denied by Congress, which did not want to set a precedent regarding the secession of states. By the 1790 Census, the populations of Tennessee and Kentucky had grown dramatically to 73,000 and 35,000, respectively. Kentucky, Tennessee, and Vermont would all gain statehood between 1791 and 1795.

With the aid of Britain and Spain, Native Americans resisted western settlement. Though Southern leaders and many federalists lent their political support to the settlers, most Northern leaders were more concerned with trade than with western settlement, and the weak central government lacked the power to compel concessions from foreign governments. The 1784 closure of the Mississippi River by Spain denied access to the sea for the exports of Western farmers, greatly impeding efforts to settle the West, and they provided arms to Native Americans. The British had restricted settlement of the trans-Appalachian lands prior to 1776, and they continued to supply arms to Native Americans after the signing of the Treaty of Paris. Between 1783 and 1787, hundreds of settlers died in low-level conflicts with Native Americans, and these conflicts discouraged further settlement. As Congress provided little military support against the Native Americans, most of the fighting was done by the settlers. By the end of the decade, the frontier was engulfed in the Northwest Indian War against a confederation of Native American tribes. These Native Americans sought the creation of an independent Indian barrier state with the support of the British, posing a major foreign policy challenge to the United States.

== Economy and trade ==
A brief economic recession followed the war, but prosperity returned by 1786. About 80,000 Loyalists left the U.S. for elsewhere in the British Empire, leaving the lands and properties behind. Some returned after the war, especially to more welcoming states like New York and South Carolina. Mid-Atlantic states recovered particularly quickly and began manufacturing and processing goods, while New England and the South experienced more uneven recoveries. Trade with Britain resumed, and the volume of British imports after the war matched the volume from before the war, but exports fell precipitously. Adams, serving as the ambassador to Britain, called for a retaliatory tariff in order to force the British to negotiate a commercial treaty, particularly regarding access to Caribbean markets. However, Congress lacked the power to regulate foreign commerce or compel the states to follow a unified trade policy, and Britain proved unwilling to negotiate. While trade with the British did not fully recover, the U.S. expanded trade with France, the Netherlands, Portugal, and other European countries. Despite these good economic conditions, many traders complained of the high duties imposed by each state, which served to restrain interstate trade. Many creditors also suffered from the failure of domestic governments to repay debts incurred during the war. Though the 1780s saw moderate economic growth, many experienced economic anxiety, and Congress received much of the blame for failing to foster a stronger economy.

== Foreign affairs ==
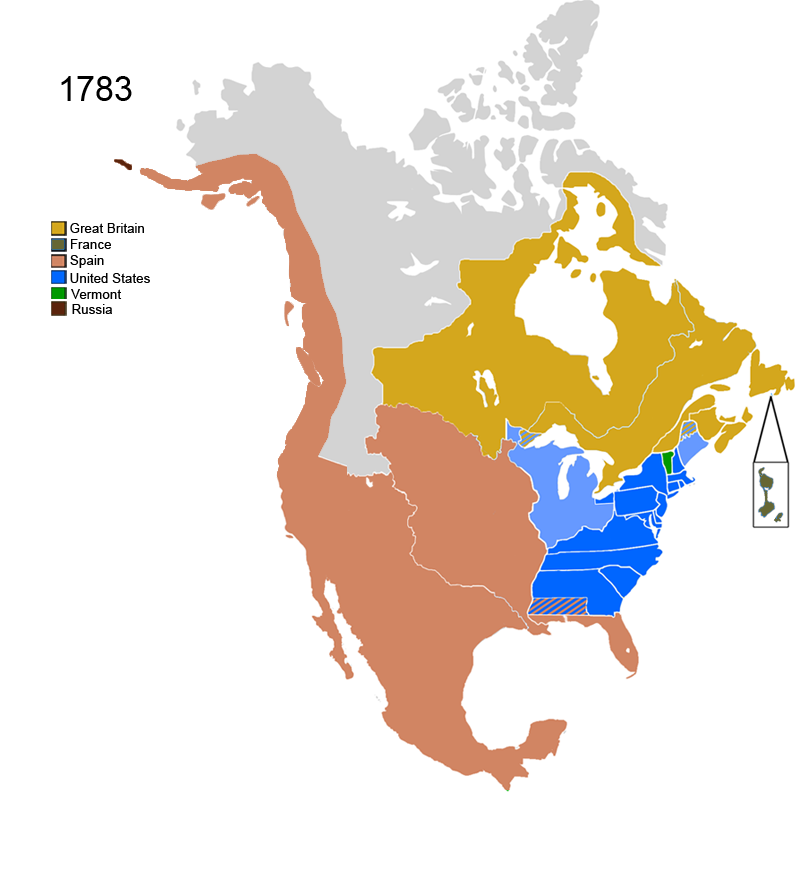
North America after the Treaty of Paris. The United States (blue) was bordered by the United Kingdom (yellow) to the north and Spain (brown) to the south and west.

In the decade after the end of the Revolutionary War, the United States benefited from a long period of peace in Europe, as no country posed a direct and immediate threat to the United States. Nevertheless, the weakness of the central government, and the desire of anti-federalists to keep a federal government from assuming powers held by the state governments, greatly hindered diplomacy. In 1776, the Continental Congress had drafted the Model Treaty, which served as a guide for U.S. foreign policy during the 1780s. The treaty sought to abolish trade barriers such as tariffs, while avoiding political or military entanglements. In this, it reflected the foreign policy priorities of many Americans, who sought to play a large role in the global trading community while avoiding war. Lacking a strong military, and divided by differing sectional priorities, the U.S. was often forced to accept unfavorable terms of trade during the 1780s.

=== Britain ===
William Petty, 2nd Earl of Shelburne, served as Prime Minister during the negotiations that led to the Treaty of Paris. Shelburne favored peaceful relations and increased trade with the U.S., but his government fell in 1783, and his successors were less intent on amicable relations with the United States. Many British leaders hoped that the U.S. would ultimately collapse due to its lack of cohesion, at which point Britain could re-establish hegemony over North America. In western territories—chiefly in present-day Wisconsin and Michigan—the British retained control of several forts and continued to cultivate alliances with Native Americans. These policies impeded U.S. settlement and allowed Britain to maintain control over the lucrative North American fur trade. The British justified their continued occupation of the forts on the basis that the Americans had blocked the collection of pre-war debts owed to British subjects, which a subsequent investigation by Jay confirmed. As there was little the powerless Congress could do to coerce the states into resolving the debt issue, the British retained their justification for the occupation of the forts until the matter was settled by the Jay Treaty in 1795.

Jay emphasized the need for expanded international trade, specifically with Great Britain, which conducted by far the most international trade. However, Britain continued to pursue mercantilist economic policies, excluded the U.S. from trading with its Caribbean colonies, and flooded the U.S. with manufactured goods. U.S. merchants responded by opening up an entirely new market in China. Americans eagerly purchased tea, silks, spices, and chinaware, while the Chinese were eager for American ginseng and furs.

=== Spain ===
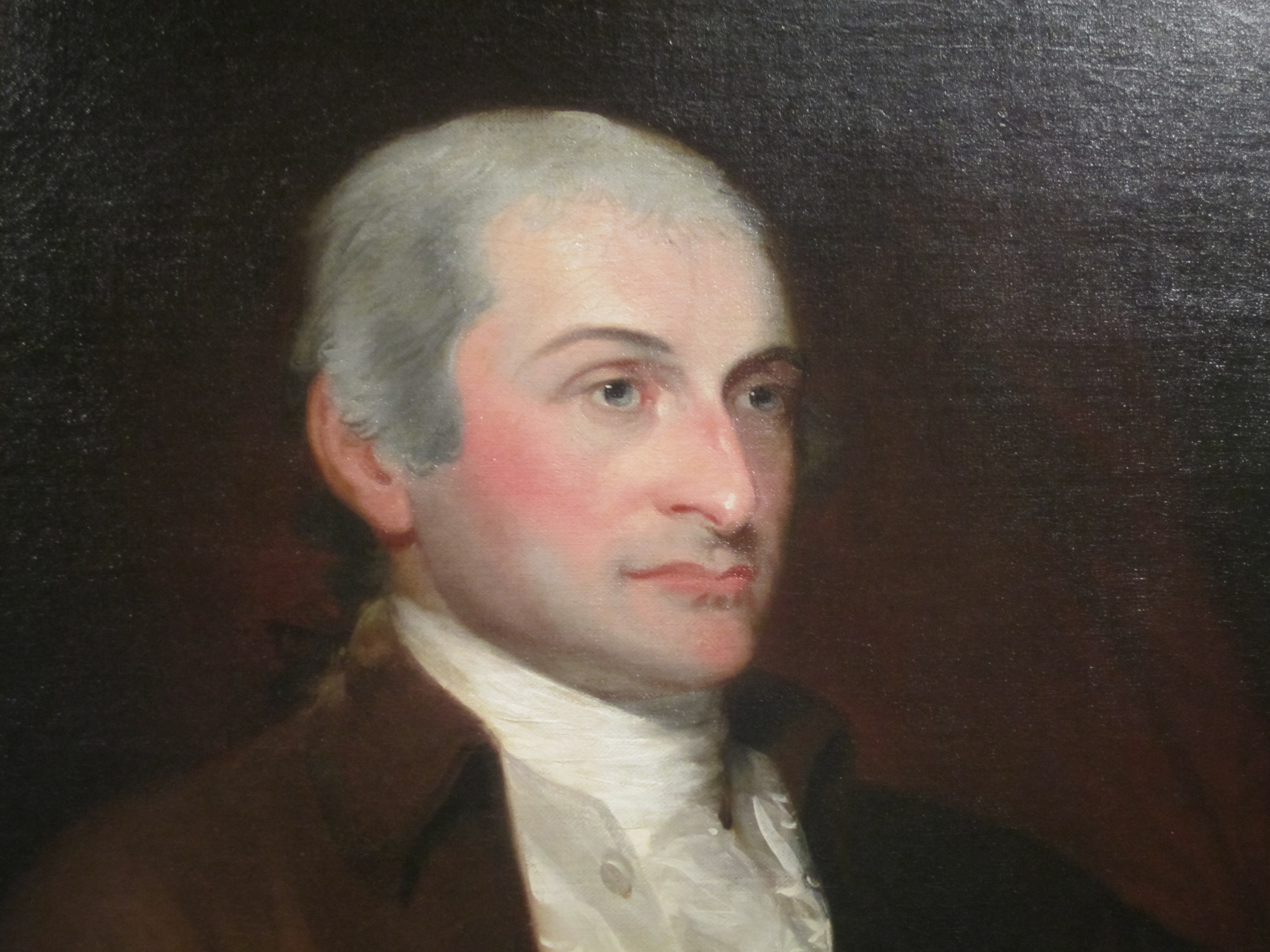
John Jay served as Secretary of Foreign Affairs from 1784 to 1789.

Spain fought the British as an ally of France during the Revolutionary War, but it distrusted the ideology of republicanism and was not officially an ally of the United States. Spain controlled the territories of Florida and Louisiana, positioned to the south and west of the United States. Americans had long recognized the importance of navigation rights on the Mississippi River, as it was the only realistic outlet for many settlers in the trans-Appalachian lands to ship their products to other markets, including the Eastern Seaboard of the United States.

Despite having fought a common enemy in the Revolutionary War, Spain saw U.S. expansionism as a threat to its empire. Seeking to stop the American settlement of the Old Southwest, Spain denied the U.S. navigation rights on the Mississippi River, provided arms to Native Americans, and recruited friendly American settlers to the sparsely populated territories of Florida and Louisiana. Working with Alexander McGillivray, Spain signed treaties with Creeks, the Chickasaws, and the Choctaws to make peace among themselves and ally with Spain, but the pan-Indian coalition proved unstable. Spain also bribed American General James Wilkinson in a plot to make much of the southwestern United States secede, but nothing came of it.

Despite geopolitical tensions, Spanish merchants welcomed trade with the United States and encouraged the U.S. to set up consulates in Spain's New World colonies. A new line of commerce emerged in which American merchants imported goods from Britain and then resold them to the Spanish colonies. The U.S. and Spain reached the Jay–Gardoqui Treaty, which would have required the U.S. to renounce any right to access the Mississippi River for twenty-five years in return for a commercial treaty and the mutual recognition of borders. In 1786, Jay submitted the treaty to Congress, precipitating a divisive debate. Southerners, led by James Monroe of Virginia, opposed the provision regarding the Mississippi and accused Jay of favoring Northeastern commercial interests over western growth. Ratification of treaties required nine votes under the Articles of Confederation, and all five Southern states voted against ratification, dooming the treaty.

=== France ===
Under the leadership of Foreign Minister Vergennes, France had entered the Revolutionary War, in large part to damage the British. The French were an indispensable ally during the war, providing supplies, finances, and a powerful navy. In 1778, France and the United States signed the Treaty of Alliance, establishing a "perpetual" military alliance, as well as the Treaty of Amity and Commerce, which established commercial ties. In the Treaty of Paris, Britain consented to relatively favorable terms to the United States partly out of a desire to weaken U.S. dependency on France. After the war, the U.S. sought increased trade with France, but commerce between the two countries remained limited. The U.S. also requested French aid in pressuring the British to evacuate their forts in U.S. territory, but the French were not willing to intervene in Anglo-American relations again.

=== Other issues ===
John Adams, as ambassador to the Netherlands, managed to convince the small country to break its alliance with Britain, join the war alongside France, and provide funding and formal recognition to the United States in 1782. The Netherlands, along with France, became the major American ally in Europe.

The Barbary pirates, who operated out of the North African states of Morocco, Algiers, Tunis, and Tripoli, posed a threat to shipping in the Mediterranean Sea during the late 18th century. The major European powers paid the Barbary pirates tribute to avoid their raids, but the U.S. was not willing to meet the terms sought by the pirates, in part due to the central government's lack of money. As such, the pirates preyed on U.S. shipping during the 1780s.

== Creation of a new constitution ==
=== Reform efforts ===
The end of the war in 1783 temporarily ended any possibility of the states giving up power to a central government, but some in and out of Congress continued to favor a stronger or more effective federal government. Soldiers and former soldiers formed a powerful bloc calling for a better federal government, which they believed would have allowed for better war-time leadership. They were joined by merchants, who wanted a strong federal government to provide order and sound economic policies, and many expansionists, who believed the central government could best protect American lands in the West. Additionally, John Jay, Henry Knox, and others called for an independent executive who could govern more decisively than a large, legislative body like Congress. Despite growing feelings of nationalism, particularly among younger Americans, the efforts of federalism to grant Congress greater powers were defeated by those who preferred the continued supremacy of the states. Most Americans saw the Revolutionary War as a struggle against a strong government, and few state leaders were willing to surrender their own state's sovereignty. In 1786, Charles Cotesworth Pinckney of South Carolina led the creation of a grand congressional committee to consider constitutional amendments. The committee proposed seven amendments, and its proposals would have granted the central government the power to regulate commerce and fine states that failed to supply adequate funding to Congress. Congress failed to act on these proposals, and reformers began to take action outside of Congress.

=== Calling the Philadelphia Convention ===
In 1785, Washington hosted the Mount Vernon Conference, which established an agreement between Maryland and Virginia regarding several commercial issues. Encouraged by this example of interstate cooperation, Madison convinced the Virginia assembly to host another conference, the Annapolis Convention, with the goal of promoting interstate trade. Only five state delegations attended the convention, but the delegates who did attend largely agreed on the need to reform the federal government. The delegates called for a second convention to take place in 1787 in Philadelphia to consider constitutional reform. In the months after the Annapolis Convention, reformers took steps to ensure better turnout at the next convention. They secured the blessing of Congress to consider constitutional reform and made sure to invite Washington, the most prominent American leader. The federalist call for a constitutional convention was bolstered by the outbreak of Shays' Rebellion, which convinced many of the need for a federal government powerful enough to help suppress uprisings.

Though there was not a widespread feeling in the population that the Articles of Confederation needed major reform, the leaders of each state recognized the problems posed by the weak central government. When the Philadelphia Convention opened in May 1787, every state but Rhode Island sent a delegation. Three quarters of the delegates had served in Congress, and all recognized the difficulty, and importance, of amending the Articles. Though each delegate feared the loss of their own state's power, there was wide agreement among the delegates that the United States required a more effective federal government capable of effectively managing foreign relations and ensuring security. Many also hoped to establish a uniform currency and common copyright and immigration laws. With the attendance of powerful and respected leaders like Washington and Franklin, who helped provide some measure of legitimacy to the convocation, the delegates agreed to pursue sweeping changes to the central government.

=== Writing a new constitution ===
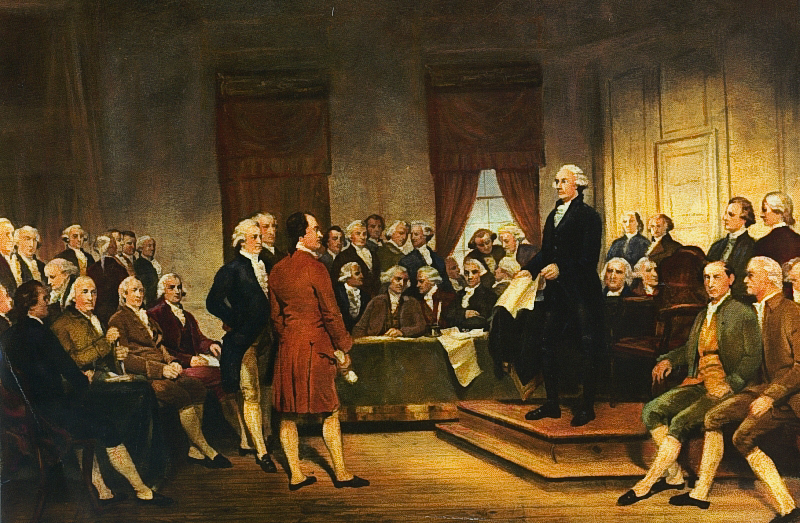
The 1787 Constitutional Convention by Junius Brutus Stearns, 1856

Shortly after the convention began in September 1787, delegates elected Washington to preside over the convention and agreed that the meetings would not be open to the public. The latter decision allowed for the consideration of an entirely new constitution, as open consideration of a new constitution would likely have inspired great public outcry. Led by James Madison, Virginia's delegates introduced a set of reforms known as the Virginia Plan, which called for a more effective central government with three independent branches of government: executive, legislative, and judicial. The plan envisioned a strong federal government with the power to nullify state laws. Madison's plan was well-received and served as the basis for the convention's discussion, though several of its provisions were altered over the course of the convention. During the convention, Madison and James Wilson of Pennsylvania emerged as two of the most important advocates of a new constitution based on the Virginia Plan, while prominent opponents to the final document would include Edmund Randolph, George Mason, and Elbridge Gerry.

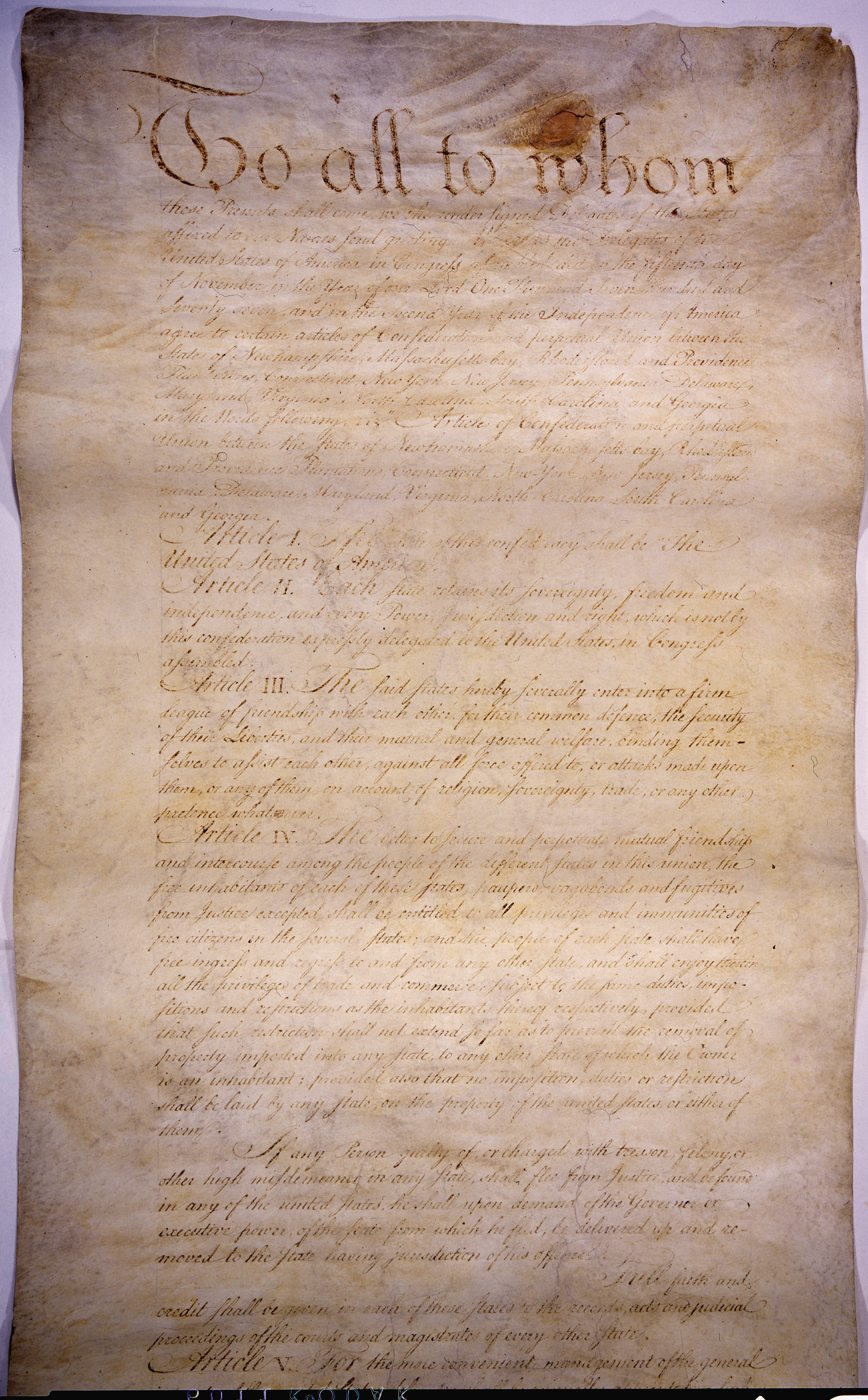
The Articles of Confederation served as the first constitution of the United States.

The balance of power between the federal government and the state governments emerged as the most debated topic of the convention, and the convention ultimately agreed to a framework in which the federal and state governments shared power. The federal government would regulate interstate and foreign commerce, coin money, and oversee foreign relations, but states would continue to exercise power in other areas. A second major issue was the allocation of congressional representatives. Delegates from large states wanted representation in Congress to be proportional to population, while delegates from smaller states preferred that each state receive equal representation. In the Connecticut Compromise, the delegates agreed to create a bicameral Congress in which each state received equal representation in the upper house (the Senate), while representation in the lower house (the House of Representatives) was apportioned by population. The issue of slavery also threatened to derail the convention, though abolition was not a priority for Northern delegates. The delegates agreed to the Three-Fifths Compromise, which counted three-fifths of the slave population for the purposes of taxation and representation. Southerners also won inclusion of the Fugitive Slave Clause, which allowed owners to recover their escaped slaves from free states, as well as a clause that forbid Congress from banning the Atlantic slave trade until 1808. The delegates of the convention also sought to limit the democratic nature of the new constitution, with indirect elections established for the Senate and the office of the President of the United States, who would lead the executive branch.

The proposed constitution contained several other important differences from the Articles of Confederation. States saw their economic power severely curtailed, and notably were barred from impairing contracts. While members of the Congress of the Confederation and most state legislators served one-year terms, members of the House would serve for two-year terms and members of the Senate would serve for six-year terms. Neither house of Congress would be subject to term limits. Though the states would elect members of the Senate, the House of Representatives would be elected directly by the people. The president would be elected independent of the legislature, and hold broad powers over foreign affairs, military policy, and appointments. The president also received the power to veto legislation. The judicial power of the United States would be vested in the Supreme Court of the United States and any inferior courts established by Congress, and these courts would have jurisdiction over federal issues. The amendment process would no longer require unanimous consent of the states, although it still required the approval of Congress and a majority of states.

=== Struggle for ratification ===
Constitutional ratification by state
	Date	State	Votes	
	Date	State	Yea	Nay
1	December 7, 1787	Delaware	30	0
2	December 11, 1787	Pennsylvania	46	23
3	December 18, 1787	New Jersey	38	0
4	January 2, 1788	Georgia	26	0
5	January 9, 1788	Connecticut	128	40
6	February 6, 1788	Massachusetts	187	168
7	April 26, 1788	Maryland	63	11
8	May 23, 1788	South Carolina	149	73
9	June 21, 1788	New Hampshire	57	47
10	June 25, 1788	Virginia	89	79
11	July 26, 1788	New York	30	27
12	November 21, 1789	North Carolina	194	77
13	May 29, 1790	Rhode Island	34	32

Ratification of the Constitution written at the Philadelphia Convention was not assured, as opponents of a stronger federal government mobilized against ratification. Even by the end of the convention, sixteen of the fifty-five delegates had either left the convention or refused to sign the document. Article Seven of the Constitution provided for submission of the document to state conventions, rather than Congress or the state legislatures, for ratification. Though Congress had not authorized consideration of a new Constitution, most members of Congress respected the stature of the leaders who had assembled in Philadelphia. Roughly one-third of the members of Congress had been delegates at the Philadelphia Convention, and these former delegates proved to be powerful advocates for the new constitution. After debating for several days, Congress transmitted the Constitution to the states without recommendation, letting each state decide for itself whether or not to ratify the document.

Ratification of the Constitution required the approval of nine states. The ratification debates in Massachusetts, New York, Pennsylvania, and Virginia were of particular importance, as they were the four largest and most powerful states in the nation. Those who advocated ratification took the name Federalists. To sway the closely divided New York legislature, Hamilton, Madison, and Jay anonymously published The Federalist Papers, which became seminal documents that affected the debate in New York and other states. Opponents of the new constitution became known as Anti-Federalists. Though most Anti-Federalists acknowledged the need for changes to the Articles of Confederation, they feared the establishment of a powerful, and potentially tyrannical, central government. Members of both camps held wide ranges of views; for example, some Anti-Federalists like Luther Martin wanted only minor changes to the Articles of Confederation, while others such as George Mason favored a less powerful version of the federal government proposed by the Constitution. Federalists were strongest in eastern, urban counties, while Anti-Federalists tended to be stronger in rural areas. Each faction engaged in a spirited public campaign to shape the ratification debate, though the Federalists tended to be better financed and organized. Over time, the Federalists were able to convince many in the skeptical public of the merits of the new Constitution.

The Federalists won their first ratification victories in December 1787, when Delaware, Pennsylvania, and New Jersey all ratified the Constitution. By the end of February 1788, six states, including Massachusetts, had ratified the Constitution. In Massachusetts, the Federalists won over skeptical delegates by promising that the first Congress of the new Constitution would consider amendments limiting the federal government's power. This promise to amend the Constitution after its ratification proved to be extremely important in other ratification debates, as it helped Federalists win the votes of those who saw the need for the Constitution but opposed some of its provisions. In the following months, Maryland and South Carolina ratified the Constitution, but North Carolina voted against ratification, leaving the document just one state short of taking effect. In June 1788, New Hampshire and Virginia both ratified the document. In Virginia, as in Massachusetts, Federalists won support for the Constitution by promising ratification of several amendments. Though Anti-Federalism was strong in New York, its constitutional convention nonetheless ratified the document in July 1788 since failure to do so would leave the state outside of the union. Rhode Island, the lone state which had not sent a delegate to the Philadelphia Convention, was viewed as a lost cause by the Federalists due to its strong opposition to the proposed constitution, and it would not ratify the Constitution until 1790.

== Inauguration of a new government ==
1789 electoral vote totals
Name	Votes
George Washington	69
John Adams	34
John Jay	9
Robert H. Harrison	6
John Rutledge	6
John Hancock	4
George Clinton	3
Samuel Huntington	2
John Milton	2
James Armstrong	1
Benjamin Lincoln	1
Edward Telfair	1

In September 1788, the Congress of the Confederation formally certified that the Constitution had been ratified. It also set the date for the presidential election and the first meeting of the new federal government. Additionally, Congress engaged in debate regarding where the incoming government would meet, with Baltimore briefly emerging as the favorite. To the displeasure of Southern and Western interests, Congress ultimately chose to retain New York City as the seat of government.

Though Washington desired to resume his retirement following the Constitutional Convention, the American public at large anticipated that he would be the nation's first president. Federalists such as Hamilton eventually coaxed him to accept the office. On February 4, 1789, the Electoral College, the mechanism established by the Constitution to conduct the indirect presidential elections, met for the first time, with each state's presidential electors gathering in their state's capital. Under the rules then in place, each elector could vote for two persons (but the two people chosen by the elector could not both inhabit the same state as that elector), with the candidate who won the most votes becoming president and the candidate with the second-most becoming vice president. Each elector cast one vote for Washington, while John Adams won the most votes of all other candidates, and thus won election as vice president. Electors from 10 of the 13 states cast votes. There were no votes from New York, because the New York legislature failed to appoint its allotted electors in time; North Carolina and Rhode Island did not participate as they had not yet ratified the Constitution.

The Federalists performed well in the concurrent House and Senate elections, ensuring that both chambers of the United States Congress would be dominated by proponents of the federal government established by the Constitution. This in turn ensured that there would not be a constitutional convention to propose amendments, which many Federalists had feared would critically weaken the federal government.

The new federal government commenced operations with the seating of the 1st Congress in March 1789 and the inauguration of Washington the following month. In September 1789, Congress approved the United States Bill of Rights, a group of Constitutional amendments designed to protect individual liberties against federal interference, and the states ratified these amendments in 1791. After Congress voted for the Bill of Rights, North Carolina and Rhode Island ratified the Constitution in 1789 and 1790, respectively.

== Terminology ==
The period of American history between the end of the American Revolutionary War and the ratification of the Constitution has also been referred to as the "critical period" of American history. During the 1780s, many thought that the country was experiencing a crisis of leadership, as reflected by John Quincy Adams's statement in 1787 that the country was in the midst of a "critical period". In his 1857 book, The Diplomatic History of the Administrations of Washington and Adams, William Henry Trescot became the first historian to apply the phrase "America's Critical Period" to the era in American history between 1783 and 1789. The phrase was popularized by John Fiske's 1888 book, The Critical Period of American History. Fiske's use of the term "critical period" refers to the importance of the era in determining whether the United States would establish a stronger central government or break up into individual fully sovereign states. The term "critical period" thus implicitly accepts the Federalist critique of the Articles of Confederation. Other historians have used an alternative term, the "Confederation Period", to describe U.S. history between 1781 and 1789.

Historians such as Forrest McDonald have argued that the 1780s were a time of economic and political chaos. However, other historians, including Merrill Jensen, have argued that the 1780s were actually a relatively stable, prosperous time. Gordon Wood suggests that it was the idea of the Revolution and the thought that it would bring a utopian society to the new country that made it possible for people to believe they had fallen instead into a time of crisis. Historian John Ferling argues that, in 1787, only the federalists, a relatively small share of the population, viewed the era as a "Critical Period". Michael Klarman argues that the decade marked a high point of democracy and egalitarianism, and views the ratification of the Constitution in 1789 as a conservative counter-revolution.

== See also ==
- American frontier
- Colonial history of the United States, for the period prior to the American Revolutionary War
- Founding Fathers of the United States
- History of the United States (1776–1789)
