= Pennsylvania Mutiny of 1783 =

1783 protest of unpaid soldiers of the American Revolution

- Part of the American Revolutionary War
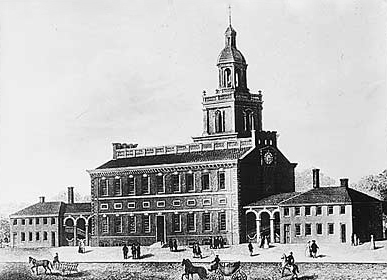
- Independence Hall in Philadelphia
- Date: June 20, 1783
- Location: Philadelphia, Pennsylvania, U.S.
- Also known as: Philadelphia Mutiny
- Participants: Congress of the Confederation, soldiers from the Pennsylvania Line
- Outcome: Capital moved from Philadelphia and a federal district, now Washington, D.C., was created in 1800

The Pennsylvania Mutiny of 1783 (also known as the Philadelphia Mutiny) was an anti-government protest by nearly 400 soldiers of the Continental Army in June 1783. The mutiny, and the refusal of the Executive Council of Pennsylvania to stop it, ultimately resulted in Congress of the Confederation vacating Philadelphia and the creation of a federal district, ultimately developed as Washington, D.C., to serve as the national capital.

== Background ==
Starting in March of 1781, Congress and the Supreme Executive Council of the Commonwealth of Pennsylvania were situated at the Pennsylvania State House (now known as Independence Hall) in Philadelphia. Under the authority of the Articles of Confederation, Congress did not have direct control over the military, except in times of war, and was largely reliant on the use of state militias to enforce laws and keep order.

On June 17, 1783, Congress received a message from soldiers of the Continental Army stationed in Philadelphia, which demanded payment as contractually required for their service during the American Revolutionary War, which Congress had failed to provide. The soldiers threatened to take action that day if their complaints were not addressed. Congress ignored their message, but the soldiers did not act on their threat. Two days later, however, the Congress received word that a group of about 80 soldiers had left their post at Lancaster, Pennsylvania, approximately 60 miles (97 km) west of Philadelphia, and had joined with the soldiers stationed at the city barracks. The group of approximately 500 men had effective control over the weapons stores and munition depot.

== Protests ==
The next morning on Friday, June 20, the State House was mobbed by as many as 400 soldiers demanding payment. The soldiers blocked the door and initially refused to allow the delegates to leave. Alexander Hamilton, a delegate from New York, persuaded the soldiers to allow Congress to meet later to address their concerns. The soldiers allowed the members of Congress to peacefully adjourn that afternoon. That evening, a small Congressional committee headed by Hamilton met in secret to draft a message to the Pennsylvania Council, asking them to protect Congress from the mutineers. The letter threatened that Congress would be forced to move elsewhere if the Council did not act.

On June 21, the Congressional committee met again at the State House with members of the Pennsylvania Executive Council, including its president, John Dickinson. The members of Congress asked the council to do more to protect the federal government. Dickinson and the council agreed to consult with the militia commanders and reply to Congress the next day. The following morning, the Pennsylvania Council again refused Congress' request. Lacking sufficient assurances that the state would be willing to protect Congress, the members left Philadelphia that day for Nassau Hall in Princeton, New Jersey, which became the provisional capital of the United States.

George Washington, on hearing of the mutiny on June 24, sent 1,500 troops under the command of Major General William Heath and General Robert Howe, who came out of retirement, to suppress the mutiny. Some of the mutineers ended up in a state of arrest, and Congress called an investigation into the event.

== Effect ==
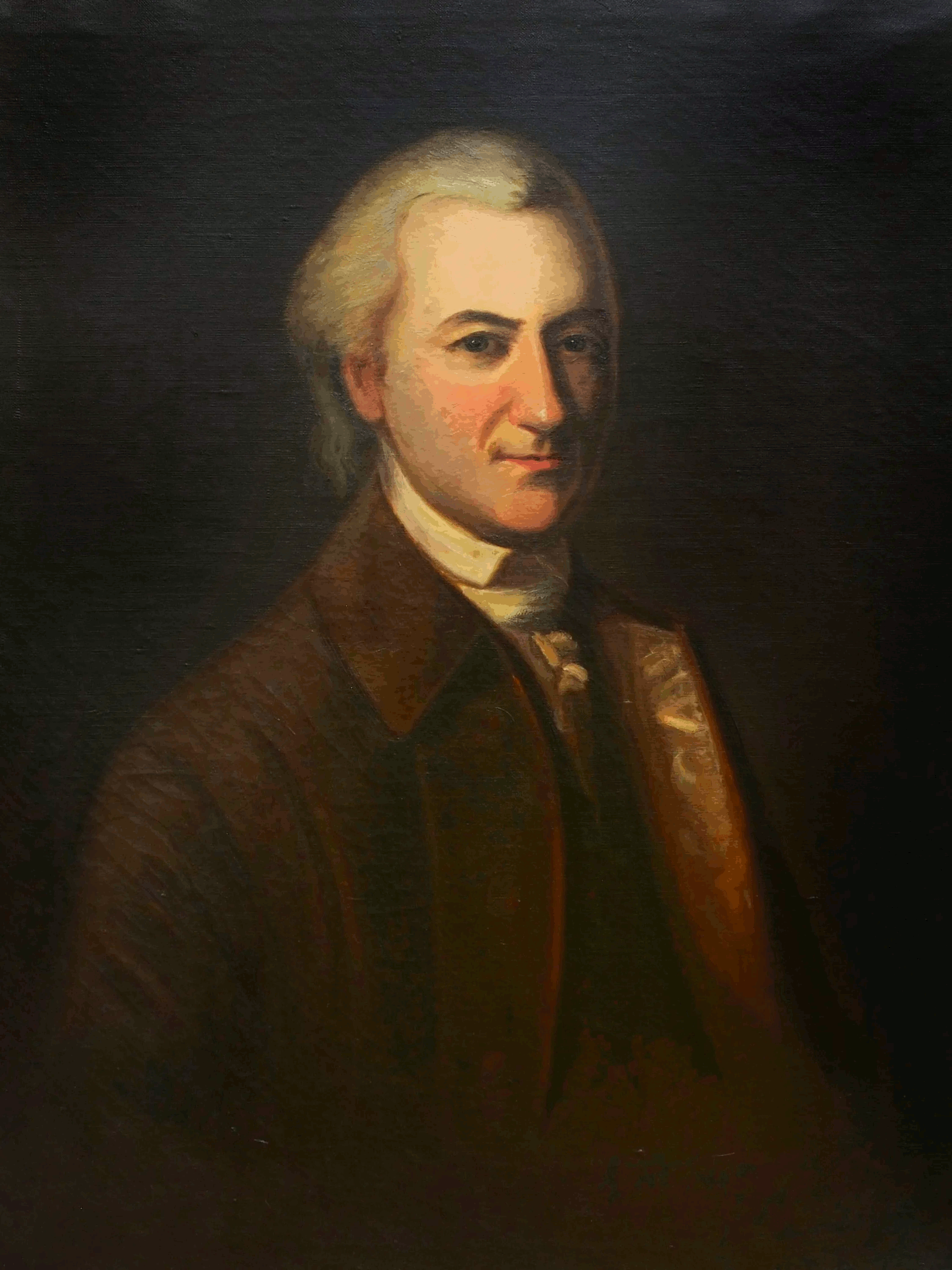
John Dickinson, President of the Executive Council of Pennsylvania

There are three reasons put forth as to why John Dickinson and the Pennsylvania Council did not act. The council's official reasoning was that they were unsure that the local militiamen would actually protect Congress from their fellow soldiers. Further, the council may have thought that the conflict was not as serious as Congress believed and that the mutiny could be resolved peacefully. The second theory put forth is that Dickinson, having been an officer in the militia, was sympathetic to the soldiers' grievances. The third theory is that the council refused to allow Pennsylvania, a sovereign state, to be subjugated by the demands of a few members of Congress.

After Congress completed its business in Princeton, New Jersey in early November 1783, the capital was moved later that month to Annapolis, Maryland, then to Trenton, New Jersey, in November 1784, and finally to New York City, in January 1785. It was not until the Constitutional Convention in 1787 that delegates decided to meet again in Philadelphia. Pennsylvania's failure to protect the United States Congress was a primary reason why the framers of the Constitution decided to create a federal district, distinct from the states, where Congress could provide for its own security.

The delegates agreed in Article One, Section 8, of the United States Constitution to give the Congress the power "to exercise exclusive legislation in all cases whatsoever, over such District (not exceeding ten miles square) as may, by cession of particular states, and the acceptance of Congress, become the seat of the government of the United States".

Following the ratification of the United States Constitution by New York in 1788, the delegates agreed to keep New York City as the temporary federal capital. In 1790, Congress passed the Residence Act, which created the District of Columbia, located on the banks of the Potomac River from land belonging to the states of Maryland and Virginia to serve as the new federal capital.

Robert Morris, a representative from Pennsylvania, convinced Congress to return to Philadelphia while the new permanent capital was being built. As a result, the Residence Act declared Philadelphia to be the temporary capital for a period of 10 years. In a final attempt to convince Congress to keep the capital in Philadelphia, the city began construction on a new presidential palace and an expansion to Congress Hall. Their efforts failed, and the federal government relocated from Philadelphia for the final time on May 14, 1800.

== See also ==
- List of incidents of civil unrest in the United States
