= Démarche =

Concept in diplomatic relations

A démarche (/deɪˈmɑːrʃ/; from the French word whose literal meaning is "step" or "solicitation") has come to refer to either:

- a line of action; move; countermove; maneuver, especially in diplomacy; or
- a formal diplomatic representation (diplomatic correspondence) of the official position, views or wishes on a subject from one government to another government or intergovernmental organization.

Diplomatic démarches are delivered to the appropriate official of a government or organization. Démarches generally seek to persuade, inform, or gather information from a foreign government. Governments may also use a démarche to protest or object to actions by a foreign government. Informally, the word is sometimes used as a verb to describe making or receiving such correspondence.

== Démarches by the United States ==
The U.S. government defines démarche as "a request or intercession with a foreign official, e.g., a request for support of a policy, or a protest about the host government's policy or actions". The US government issues démarches to foreign governments through "front-channel cable" instructions from the United States Department of State.

Any Department of State officer or other official under the authority of the chief of mission can make a démarche. Unless the Department of State provides specific instructions as to rank (for example: "the Ambassador should call on the Foreign Minister"), the embassy has discretion to determine who should make the presentation and which officials in the host government should receive it.

=== Preparation of the démarche ===
Démarche instruction cables from the Department of State include the following elements:

1. Objective: The objective is a clear statement of the purpose of the démarche, and of what the U.S. Government hopes to achieve.
2. Arguments: This section outlines how the Department of State proposes to make an effective case for its views. It should include a rationale for the U.S. Government's position, supporting arguments, likely counter-arguments, and suggested rebuttals.
3. Background: The background should spell out pitfalls; particular sensitivities of other bureaus, departments, or agencies; and any other special considerations.
4. Suggested talking points: Suggested talking points should be clear, conversational, and logically organized. Unless there are compelling reasons to require verbatim delivery, the démarche instruction cable should make it clear that the post may use its discretion and local knowledge to structure and deliver the message in the most effective way. ("Embassy may draw from the following points in making this presentation to appropriate host government officials.")
5. Written material: This section is used to provide instructions on any written material to be left with the host government officials. Such material could take the form of an aide-mémoire, a letter, or a "non-paper" that provides a written version of the verbal presentation (i.e., the talking points as delivered). Unless otherwise instructed, the post should normally provide an aide-mémoire or non-paper at the conclusion of a démarche. Any classified aide-mémoire or non-paper must be appropriately marked and caveated as to the countries authorized for receipt, e.g. "Rel. UK" indicates "Releasable to the United Kingdom")

=== Delivery and follow-up action ===
Upon receipt of démarche instructions from the Department of State, embassies should make every effort to deliver the démarche to the appropriate foreign government officials as soon as possible.

After delivering the démarche, the embassy should report to the Department of State via front-channel cable. The reporting cable should include the instruction cable as a reference, but it need not repeat the talking points transmitted in that cable. It should provide the name and title of the person to whom the démarche was made, and record that official's response to the presentation. As appropriate, the reporting cable should also describe any specific follow-up action needed by the embassy, Department of State, or the foreign government.

== See also ==
- Ultimatum
- Service of process
