= Articles of Confederation =

First constitution of the United States from 1781 to 1789

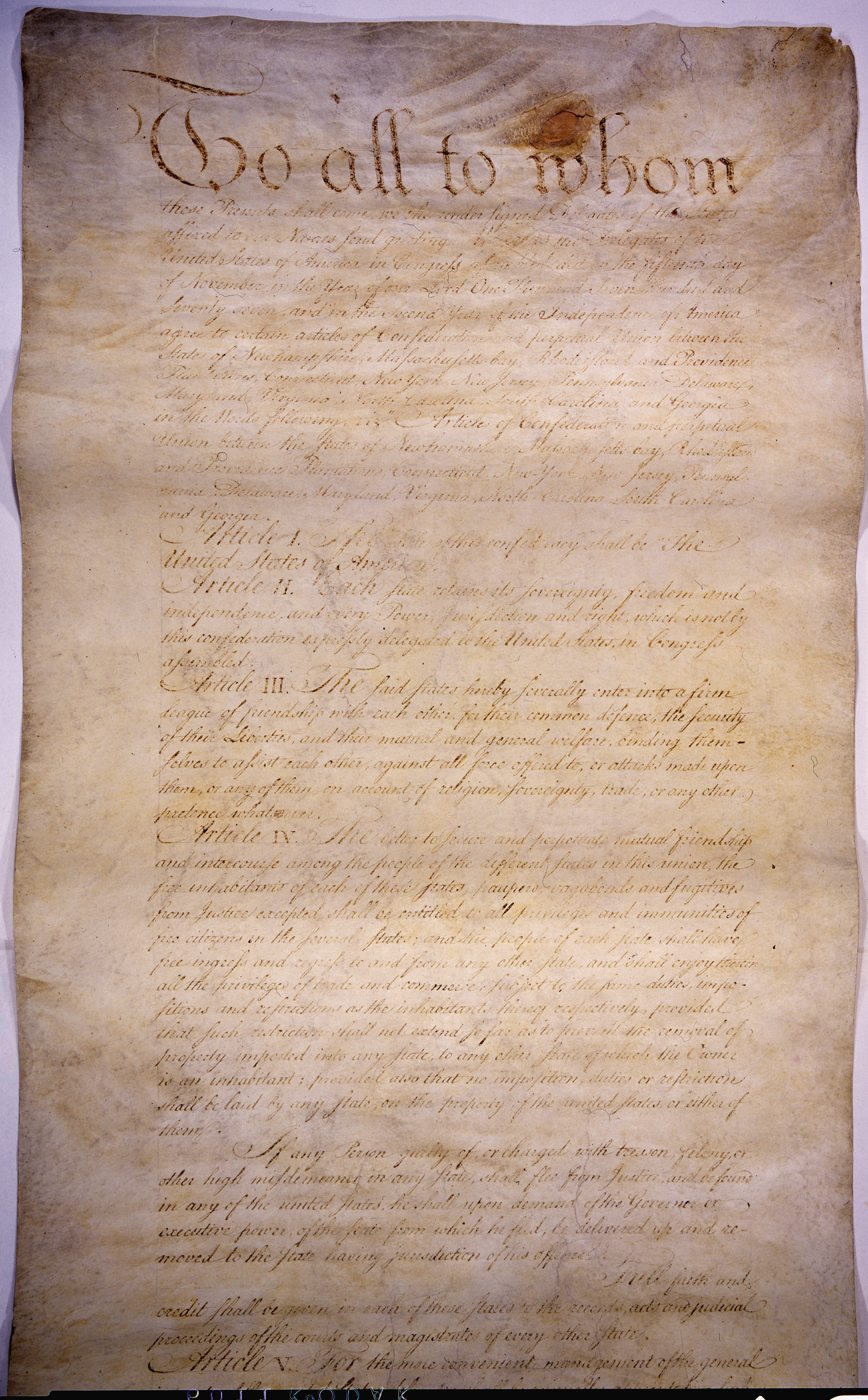
- Page I of the Articles of Confederation
- Created: November 15, 1777
- Ratified: February 2, 1781
- Date effective: March 1, 1781
- Superseded: March 4, 1789, by the United States Constitution
- Location: National Archives
- Author: Continental Congress
- Signatories: Continental Congress
- Purpose: First constitution for the United States

The Articles of Confederation, officially the Articles of Confederation and Perpetual Union, was an agreement and early body of law in the Thirteen Colonies, which served as the nation's first constitution during the American Revolution. It was debated by the Second Continental Congress at present-day Independence Hall in Philadelphia between July 1776 and November 1777, was finalized by the Congress on November 15, 1777, and came into force on March 1, 1781, after being ratified by all 13 states.

A central and guiding principle of the Articles was the establishment and preservation of the independence and sovereignty of the original 13 states. The Articles consciously established a weak confederal government, affording it only those powers the former colonies recognized as belonging to the British Crown and Parliament during the colonial era. The document provided clearly written rules for how the states' league of friendship, known as the Perpetual Union, was to be organized.

While waiting for all states to ratify the Articles, the Congress observed them as it conducted business during the American Revolution, directing the Revolutionary War effort, conducting diplomacy with foreign states, addressing territorial issues, and dealing with Native American relations. Little changed procedurally once the Articles of Confederation went into effect, since their ratification mostly codified laws already in existence and procedures the Continental Congress had already been following. The body was renamed the Congress of the Confederation, but most Americans continued to call it the Continental Congress, since its organization remained the same.

As the Confederation Congress attempted to govern the continually growing 13 colonial states, its delegates discovered that the limitations on the central government, such as in assembling delegates, raising funds, and regulating commerce, limited its ability to do so. As the government's weaknesses became apparent, especially after Shays's Rebellion, Alexander Hamilton and a few other prominent political thinkers in the fledgling union began asking for changes to the Articles that would strengthen the powers afforded to the central government.

In September 1786, some states met during the Annapolis Convention to address interstate protectionist trade barriers between them. Shortly thereafter, as more states became interested in meeting to revise the Articles, a gathering was set in Philadelphia on May 25, 1787. This became the Constitutional Convention. Delegates quickly agreed that the defects of the frame of government could not be remedied by altering the Articles, and so went beyond their mandate by authoring a new constitution and sent it to the states for ratification. After significant ratification debates in each state and across the nation, on March 4, 1789, the government under the Articles was replaced with the federal government under the Constitution. The new Constitution provided for a much stronger federal government by establishing a chief executive (the president), national courts, and taxation authority.

== Background and context ==
The political push to increase cooperation among the then-loyal colonies began with the Albany Congress in 1754 and Benjamin Franklin's proposed Albany Plan, an inter-colonial collaboration to help solve mutual local problems. Over the next two decades, some of the basic concepts it addressed would strengthen; others would weaken, especially in the degree of loyalty (or lack thereof) owed the Crown. Colonists' civil disobedience resulted in the British enacting coercive and quelling measures, such as the passage of what colonists called the Intolerable Acts in the British Parliament, and armed skirmishes which resulted in dissidents being proclaimed rebels. These actions eroded the number of colonists continuing to be Loyalists to the Crown. Together with the highly effective propaganda campaign of the Patriot leaders, they caused an increasing number of colonists to begin agitating for independence from the mother country. In 1775, with events outpacing communications, the Second Continental Congress began acting as the provisional government for the United Colonies.

It was an era of constitution writing, with most states actively engaged in drafting their own frameworks of governance. National leaders believed that the new nation required a written constitution a "rulebook" outlining how it should function. During the war, Congress exercised an unprecedented level of political, diplomatic, military, and economic authority. It imposed trade restrictions, established and maintained an army, issued fiat currency, enacted a military code, and conducted negotiations with foreign governments.

To transform themselves from outlaws into a legitimate nation, the colonists needed international recognition for their cause and foreign allies to support it. In early 1776, Thomas Paine argued in the closing pages of the first edition of Common Sense that the "custom of nations" demanded a formal declaration of American independence if any European power were to mediate a peace between the Americans and Great Britain. The monarchies of France and Spain, in particular, could not be expected to aid those they considered rebels against another legitimate monarch. Foreign courts needed to have American grievances laid before them persuasively in a "manifesto" which could also reassure them that the Americans would be reliable trading partners. Without such a declaration, Paine concluded, "[t]he custom of all courts is against us, and will be so, until, by an independence, we take rank with other nations."

Beyond improving their existing association, the records of the Second Continental Congress show that the need for a declaration of independence was intimately linked with the demands of international relations. On June 7, 1776, Richard Henry Lee introduced a resolution before the Continental Congress declaring the colonies independent; at the same time, he also urged Congress to resolve "to take the most effectual measures for forming foreign Alliances" and to prepare a plan of confederation for the newly independent states. Congress then created three overlapping committees to draft the Declaration, a model treaty, and the Articles of Confederation. The Declaration announced the states' entry into the international system; the model treaty was designed to establish amity and commerce with other states; and the Articles of Confederation, which established "a firm league" among the thirteen free and independent states, constituted an international agreement to set up central institutions for the conduct of vital domestic and foreign affairs.

== Drafting ==
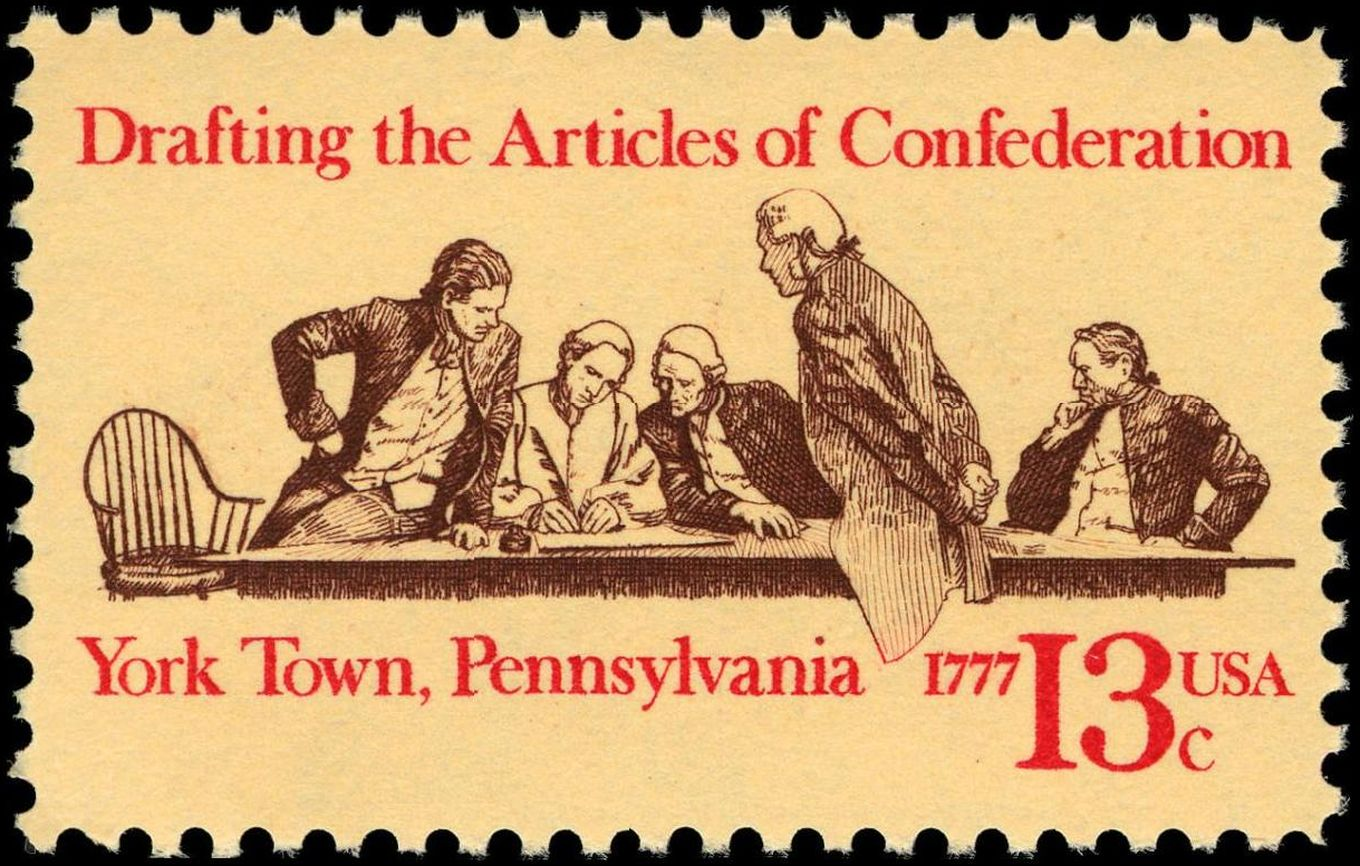
1977 13-cent U.S. Postage stamp commemorating the Articles of Confederation bicentennial; the draft was completed on November 15, 1777

On June 12, 1776, a day after appointing the Committee of Five to prepare a draft of the Declaration of Independence, the Second Continental Congress resolved to appoint a committee of 13 with one representative from each colony to prepare a draft of a constitution for a union of the states. The committee was made up of the following individuals:

- John Dickinson (Pennsylvania, chairman of the committee)
- Samuel Adams (Massachusetts)
- Josiah Bartlett (New Hampshire)
- Button Gwinnett (Georgia)
- Joseph Hewes (North Carolina)
- Stephen Hopkins (Rhode Island)
- Robert R. Livingston (New York)
- Thomas McKean (Delaware)
- Thomas Nelson (Virginia)
- Edward Rutledge (South Carolina)
- Roger Sherman (Connecticut)
- Thomas Stone (Maryland)
- Francis Hopkinson (New Jersey, added to the committee last)

The committee met frequently, and chairman John Dickinson presented their results to the Congress on July 12, 1776. Afterward, there were long debates on such issues as state sovereignty, the exact powers to be given to Congress, whether to have a judiciary, western land claims, and voting procedures. To further complicate work on the constitution, Congress was forced to leave Philadelphia twice, for Baltimore, Maryland, in the winter of 1776, and later for Lancaster and then York, Pennsylvania, in the fall of 1777, to evade advancing British troops. Even so, the committee continued with its work.

The final draft of the Articles of Confederation and Perpetual Union was completed on November 15, 1777. Consensus was achieved by including language guaranteeing that each state retained its sovereignty, leaving the matter of western land claims in the hands of the individual states, including language stating that votes in Congress would be en bloc by state, and establishing a unicameral legislature with limited and clearly delineated powers.

== Ratification ==
The Articles of Confederation was submitted to the states for ratification in late November 1777. The first state to ratify was Virginia on December 16, 1777; 12 states had ratified the Articles by February 1779, 14 months into the process. The lone holdout, Maryland, refused to go along until the landed states, especially Virginia, had indicated they were prepared to cede their claims west of the Ohio River to the Union. It would be two years before the Maryland General Assembly became satisfied that the various states would follow through, and voted to ratify. During this time, Congress observed the Articles as its de facto frame of government. Maryland finally ratified the Articles on February 2, 1781. Congress was informed of Maryland's assent on March 1, and officially proclaimed the Articles of Confederation to be the law of the land.

The several states ratified the Articles of Confederation on the following dates:

State		Date
1	Virginia	December 16, 1777
2	South Carolina	February 5, 1778
3	New York	February 6, 1778
4	Rhode Island	February 9, 1778
5	Connecticut	February 12, 1778
6	Georgia	February 26, 1778
7	New Hampshire	March 4, 1778
8	Pennsylvania	March 5, 1778
9	Massachusetts	March 10, 1778
10	North Carolina	April 5, 1778
11	New Jersey	November 19, 1778
12	Delaware	February 1, 1779
13	Maryland	February 2, 1781

== Article summaries ==
The Articles of Confederation contain a preamble, thirteen articles, a conclusion, and a signatory section. The individual articles set the rules for current and future operations of the confederation's central government. Under the Articles, the states retained sovereignty over all governmental functions not specifically relinquished to the national Congress, which was empowered to make war and peace, negotiate diplomatic and commercial agreements with foreign countries, and to resolve disputes between the states. The document also stipulates that its provisions "shall be inviolably observed by every state" and that "the Union shall be perpetual".

Summary of the purpose and content of each of the 13 articles:

1. Establishes the name of the confederation with these words: "The stile of this confederacy shall be 'The United States of America.'"
2. Asserts the sovereignty of each state, except for the specific powers delegated to the confederation government: "Each state retains its sovereignty, freedom, and independence, and every power, jurisdiction, and right, which is not by this Confederation expressly delegated."
3. Declares the purpose of the confederation: "The said States hereby severally enter into a firm league of friendship with each other, for their common defense, the security of their liberties, and their mutual and general welfare, binding themselves to assist each other, against all force offered to, or attacks made upon them, or any of them, on account of religion, sovereignty, trade, or any other pretense whatever."
4. Elaborates upon the intent "to secure and perpetuate mutual friendship and intercourse among the people of the different States in this union," and to establish equal treatment and freedom of movement for the free inhabitants of each state to pass unhindered between the states, excluding "paupers, vagabonds, and fugitives from justice." All these people are entitled to equal rights established by the state into which they travel. If a crime is committed in one state and the perpetrator flees to another state, if caught they will be extradited to and tried in the state in which the crime was committed.
5. Allocates one vote in the Congress of the Confederation (the "United States in Congress Assembled") to each state, which is entitled to a delegation of between two and seven members. Members of Congress are to be appointed by state legislatures. No congressman may serve more than three out of any six years.
6. Only the central government may declare war, or conduct foreign political or commercial relations. No state or official may accept foreign gifts or titles, and granting any title of nobility is forbidden to all. No states may form any sub-national groups. No state may tax or interfere with treaty stipulations already proposed. No state may wage war without permission of Congress, unless invaded or under imminent attack on the frontier; no state may maintain a peacetime standing army or navy, unless infested by pirates, but every State is required to keep ready, a well-trained, disciplined, and equipped militia.
7. Whenever an army is raised for common defense, the state legislatures shall assign military ranks of colonel and below.
8. Expenditures by the United States of America will be paid with funds raised by state legislatures, and apportioned to the states in proportion to the real property values of each.
9. Powers and functions of the United States in Congress Assembled.
  - Grants to the United States in Congress assembled the sole and exclusive right and power to determine peace and war; to exchange ambassadors; to enter into treaties and alliances, with some provisos; to establish rules for deciding all cases of captures or prizes on land or water; to grant letters of marque and reprisal (documents authorizing privateers) in times of peace; to appoint courts for the trial of pirates and crimes committed on the high seas; to establish courts for appeals in all cases of captures, but no member of Congress may be appointed a judge; to set weights and measures (including coins), and for Congress to serve as a final court for disputes between states.
  - The court will be composed of jointly appointed commissioners or Congress shall appoint them. Each commissioner is bound by oath to be impartial. The court's decision is final.
  - Congress shall regulate the post offices; appoint officers in the military; and regulate the armed forces.
  - The United States in Congress assembled may appoint a president who shall not serve longer than one year per three-year term of the Congress.
  - Congress may request requisitions (demands for payments or supplies) from the states in proportion with their population, or take credit.
  - Congress may not declare war, enter into treaties and alliances, appropriate money, or appoint a commander in chief without nine states assenting. Congress shall keep a journal of proceedings and adjourn for periods not to exceed six months.
10. When Congress is in recess, any of the powers of Congress may be executed by "The committee of the states, or any nine of them", except for those powers of Congress which require nine states in Congress to execute.
11. If Canada [referring to the British Province of Quebec] accedes to this confederation, it will be admitted. No other colony could be admitted without the consent of nine states.
12. Affirms that the Confederation will honor all bills of credit incurred, monies borrowed, and debts contracted by Congress before the existence of the Articles.
13. Declares that the Articles shall be perpetual, and may be altered only with the approval of Congress and the ratification of all the state legislatures.

== Congress under the Articles ==
=== Army ===
Under the Articles, Congress had the authority to regulate and fund the Continental Army, but it lacked the power to compel the States to comply with requests for either troops or funding. This left the military vulnerable to shortages in funding, supplies, and even basic necessities such as food. Further, although the Articles enabled the states to present a unified front when dealing with the European powers, as a tool to build a centralized war-making government, they were largely a failure; Historian Bruce Chadwick wrote:

George Washington had been one of the very first proponents of a strong federal government. The army had nearly disbanded on several occasions during the winters of the war because of the weaknesses of the Continental Congress. ... The delegates could not draft soldiers and had to send requests for regular troops and militia to the states. Congress had the right to order the production and purchase of provisions for the soldiers, but could not force anyone to supply them, and the army nearly starved in several winters of war.

Phelps wrote:

It is hardly surprising, given their painful confrontations with a weak central government and the sovereign states, that the former generals of the Revolution as well as countless lesser officers strongly supported the creation of a more muscular union in the 1780s and fought hard for the ratification of the Constitution in 1787. Their wartime experiences had nationalized them.

The Continental Congress, before the Articles were approved, had promised soldiers a pension of half pay for life. However Congress had no power to compel the states to fund this obligation, and as the war wound down after the victory at Yorktown the sense of urgency to support the military was no longer a factor. No progress was made in Congress during the winter of 1783–84. General Henry Knox, who would later become the first Secretary of War under the Constitution, blamed the weaknesses of the Articles for the inability of the government to fund the army. The army had long been supportive of a strong union.

Knox wrote:

The army generally have always reprobated the idea of being thirteen armies. Their ardent desires have been to be one continental body looking up to one sovereign. ... It is a favorite toast in the army, "A hoop to the barrel" or "Cement to the Union".

As Congress failed to act on the petitions, Knox wrote to Gouverneur Morris, four years before the Philadelphia Convention was convened, "As the present Constitution is so defective, why do not you great men call the people together and tell them so; that is, to have a convention of the States to form a better Constitution."

Once the war had been won, the Continental Army was largely disbanded. A very small national force was maintained to man the frontier forts and to protect against Native American attacks. Meanwhile, each of the states had an army (or militia), and 11 of them had navies. The wartime promises of bounties and land grants to be paid for service were not being met. In 1783, George Washington defused the Newburgh conspiracy, but riots by unpaid Pennsylvania veterans forced Congress to leave Philadelphia temporarily.

The Congress from time to time during the Revolutionary War requisitioned troops from the states. Any contributions were voluntary, and in the debates of 1788, the Federalists (who supported the proposed new Constitution) claimed that state politicians acted unilaterally, and contributed when the Continental army protected their state's interests. The Anti-Federalists claimed that state politicians understood their duty to the Union and contributed to advance its needs. Dougherty (2009) concludes that generally the States' behavior validated the Federalist analysis. This helps explain why the Articles of Confederation needed reforms.

=== Foreign policy ===
The 1783 Treaty of Paris, which ended hostilities with Great Britain, languished in Congress for several months because too few delegates were present at any one time to constitute a quorum so that it could be ratified. Afterward, the problem only got worse as Congress had no power to enforce attendance. Rarely did more than half of the roughly sixty delegates attend a session of Congress at the time, causing difficulties in raising a quorum. The resulting paralysis embarrassed and frustrated many American nationalists, including George Washington. Many of the most prominent national leaders, such as Washington, John Adams, John Hancock, and Benjamin Franklin, retired from public life, served as foreign delegates, or held office in state governments; and for the general public, local government and self-rule seemed quite satisfactory. This served to exacerbate Congress's impotence.

Inherent weaknesses in the confederation's frame of government also frustrated the ability of the government to conduct foreign policy. In 1786, Thomas Jefferson, concerned over the failure of Congress to fund an American naval force to confront the Barbary pirates, wrote in a diplomatic correspondence to James Monroe that, "It will be said there is no money in the treasury. There never will be money in the treasury till the Confederacy shows its teeth."

Furthermore, the 1786 Jay–Gardoqui Treaty with Spain also showed weakness in foreign policy. In this treaty, which was never ratified, the United States was to give up rights to use the Mississippi River for 25 years, which would have economically strangled the settlers west of the Appalachian Mountains. Finally, due to the Confederation's military weakness, it could not force the British to evacuate frontier forts which they had promised to do so in the Treaty of Paris. Britain justified its refusal to evacuate the forts by citing the United States' failure to uphold the terms of the treaty, specifically those which promised an end to the persecution of Loyalists on American soil and allowed Loyalists to seek compensation in US courts. The dispute would later be resolved by the implementation of Jay's Treaty in 1795 after the federal Constitution came into force.

=== Taxation and commerce ===
Under the Articles of Confederation, the central government's power was kept quite limited. The Confederation Congress could make decisions but lacked enforcement powers. Implementation of most decisions, including modifications to the Articles, required unanimous approval of all thirteen state legislatures.

Congress was denied any powers of taxation: it could only request money from the states. The states often failed to meet these requests in full, leaving both Congress and the Continental Army chronically short of money. As more money was printed by Congress, the continental dollars depreciated. In 1779, George Washington wrote to John Jay, who was serving as the president of the Continental Congress, "that a wagon load of money will scarcely purchase a wagon load of provisions." Mr. Jay and the Congress responded in May by requesting $45 million from the States. In an appeal to the States to comply, Jay wrote that the taxes were "the price of liberty, the peace, and the safety of yourselves and posterity." He argued that Americans should avoid having it said "that America had no sooner become independent than she became insolvent" or that "her infant glories and growing fame were obscured and tarnished by broken contracts and violated faith." The States did not respond with any of the money requested from them.

Congress had also been denied the power to regulate either foreign trade or interstate commerce and, as a result, all of the States maintained control over their own trade policies. The states and the Confederation Congress both incurred large debts during the Revolutionary War, and how to repay those debts became a major issue of debate following the War. Some States paid off their war debts and others did not. Federal assumption of the states' war debts became a major issue in the deliberations of the Constitutional Convention.

=== Accomplishments ===
Nevertheless, the Confederation Congress did take two actions with long-lasting impact. The Land Ordinance of 1785 and Northwest Ordinance created territorial government, set up protocols for the admission of new states and the division of land into useful units, and set aside land in each township for public use. This system represented a sharp break from imperial colonization, as in Europe, and it established the precedent by which the national (later, federal) government would be sovereign and expand westward—as opposed to the existing states doing so under their sovereignty.

The Land Ordinance of 1785 established both the general practices of land surveying in the west and northwest and the land ownership provisions used throughout the later westward expansion beyond the Mississippi River. Frontier lands were surveyed into the now-familiar squares of land called the township (36 square miles), the section (one square mile), and the quarter section (160 acres). This system was carried forward to most of the States west of the Mississippi (excluding areas of Texas and California that had already been surveyed and divided up by the Spanish Empire). Then, when the Homestead Act was enacted in 1867, the quarter section became the basic unit of land that was granted to new settler-farmers.

The Northwest Ordinance of 1787 noted the agreement of the original states to give up northwestern land claims, organized the Northwest Territory and laid the groundwork for the eventual creation of new states. Although it did not happen under the articles, the land north of the Ohio River and west of the (present) western border of Pennsylvania ceded by Massachusetts, Connecticut, New York, Pennsylvania, and Virginia, eventually became the states of Ohio, Indiana, Illinois, Michigan, and Wisconsin, and the part of Minnesota that is east of the Mississippi River. The Northwest Ordinance of 1787 also made great advances in the abolition of slavery. New states admitted to the union in this territory would never be slave states.

No new states were admitted to the Union under the Articles of Confederation. The Articles provided for a blanket acceptance of the Province of Quebec (referred to as "Canada" in the Articles) into the United States if it chose to do so. It did not, and the subsequent Constitution carried no such special provision of admission. Additionally, ordinances to admit Frankland (later modified to Franklin), Kentucky, and Vermont to the Union were considered, but none were approved.

=== Presidents of Congress ===
Under the Articles of Confederation, the presiding officer of Congress—referred to in many official records as President of the United States in Congress Assembled—chaired the Committee of the States when Congress was in recess, and performed other administrative functions. He was not, however, an executive in the way the later president of the United States is a chief executive, since all of the functions he executed were under the direct control of Congress.

There were 10 presidents of Congress under the Articles. The first, Samuel Huntington, had been serving as president of the Continental Congress since September 28, 1779.

President	Term
Samuel Huntington	March 1, 1781 – July 10, 1781
Thomas McKean	July 10, 1781 – November 5, 1781
John Hanson	November 5, 1781 – November 4, 1782
Elias Boudinot	November 4, 1782 – November 3, 1783
Thomas Mifflin	November 3, 1783 – June 3, 1784
Richard Henry Lee	November 30, 1784 – November 4, 1785
John Hancock	November 23, 1785 – June 5, 1786
Nathaniel Gorham	June 6, 1786 – November 3, 1786
Arthur St. Clair	February 2, 1787 – November 4, 1787
Cyrus Griffin	January 22, 1788 – November 15, 1788

== U.S. under the Articles ==
The peace treaty left the United States independent and at peace but with an unsettled governmental structure. The Articles envisioned a permanent confederation but granted to the Congress—the only federal institution—little power to finance itself or to ensure that its resolutions were enforced. There was no president, no executive agencies, no judiciary, and no tax base. The absence of a tax base meant that there was no way to pay off state and national debts from the war years except by requesting money from the states, which seldom arrived. Although historians generally agree that the Articles were too weak to hold the fast-growing nation together, they do give credit to the settlement of the western issue, as the states voluntarily turned over their lands to national control.

By 1783, the new nation was regaining its prosperity due to the end of armed conflict. However, American trade opportunities were limited by the mercantilism of European governments. The British West Indies were closed to all staple products which were not carried in British-flagged ships, and France and Spain had established similar policies. Simultaneously, new US manufacturers faced sharp competition from British products which were suddenly available again. Political unrest in several states and efforts by debtors to use popular government to erase their debts increased the anxiety of the political and economic elites which had led the Revolution. The apparent inability of the Congress to redeem the public obligations (debts) incurred during the war, or to become a forum for productive cooperation among the states to encourage commerce and economic development, only aggravated a gloomy situation. In 1786–87, Shays's Rebellion, an uprising of dissidents in western Massachusetts against the state court system, threatened the stability of state government.

The Continental Congress printed paper money which was so depreciated that it ceased to pass as currency, spawning the expression "not worth a continental". Congress could not levy taxes and could only make requisitions upon the States. Less than a million and a half dollars came into the treasury between 1781 and 1784, although the governors had been asked for two million in 1783 alone.

When John Adams went to London in 1785 as the first representative of the United States, he found it impossible to secure a treaty for unrestricted commerce. Demands were made for favors and there was no assurance that individual states would agree to a treaty. Adams stated it was necessary for the States to confer the power of passing navigation laws to Congress, or that the States themselves pass retaliatory acts against Britain. Congress had already requested and failed to get power over navigation laws. Meanwhile, each State acted individually against Britain to little effect. When other New England states closed their ports to British shipping, Connecticut hastened to profit by opening its ports.

By 1787, Congress was unable to protect manufacturing and shipping. State legislatures were unable or unwilling to resist attacks upon private contracts and public credit. Land speculators expected no rise in values when the government could not defend its borders nor protect its frontier population.

The idea of a convention to revise the Articles of Confederation grew in favor. Alexander Hamilton realized while serving as Washington's top aide that a strong central government was necessary to avoid foreign intervention and allay the frustrations due to an ineffectual Congress. Hamilton led a group of like-minded nationalists, won Washington's endorsement, and convened the Annapolis Convention in 1786 to petition Congress to call a constitutional convention to meet in Philadelphia to remedy the long-term crisis.

== Signatures ==
The Second Continental Congress approved the Articles for distribution to the states on November 15, 1777. A copy was made for each state and one was kept by the Congress. On November 28, the copies sent to the states for ratification were unsigned, and the cover letter, dated November 17, had only the signatures of Henry Laurens and Charles Thomson, who were the President and Secretary to the Congress.

The Articles, however, were unsigned, and the date was blank. Congress began the signing process by examining their copy of the Articles on June 27, 1778. They ordered a final copy prepared (the one in the National Archives), and that delegates should inform the secretary of their authority for ratification.

On July 9, 1778, the prepared copy was ready. They dated it and began to sign. They also requested each of the remaining states to notify its delegation when ratification was completed. On that date, delegates present from New Hampshire, Massachusetts, Rhode Island, Connecticut, New York, Pennsylvania, Virginia and South Carolina signed the Articles to indicate that their states had ratified. New Jersey, Delaware and Maryland could not, since their states had not ratified. North Carolina and Georgia also were unable to sign that day, since their delegations were absent.

After the first signing, some delegates signed at the next meeting they attended. For example, John Wentworth of New Hampshire added his name on August 8. John Penn was the first of North Carolina's delegates to arrive (on July 10), and the delegation signed the Articles on July 21, 1778.

The other states had to wait until they ratified the Articles and notified their Congressional delegation. Georgia signed on July 24, New Jersey on November 26, and Delaware on February 12, 1779. Maryland refused to ratify the Articles until every state had ceded its western land claims. Chevalier de La Luzerne, French Minister to the United States, felt that the Articles would help strengthen the American government. In 1780, when Maryland requested France provide naval forces in the Chesapeake Bay for protection from the British (who were conducting raids in the lower part of the bay), he indicated that French Admiral Destouches would do what he could but La Luzerne also "sharply pressed" Maryland to ratify the Articles, thus suggesting the two issues were related.

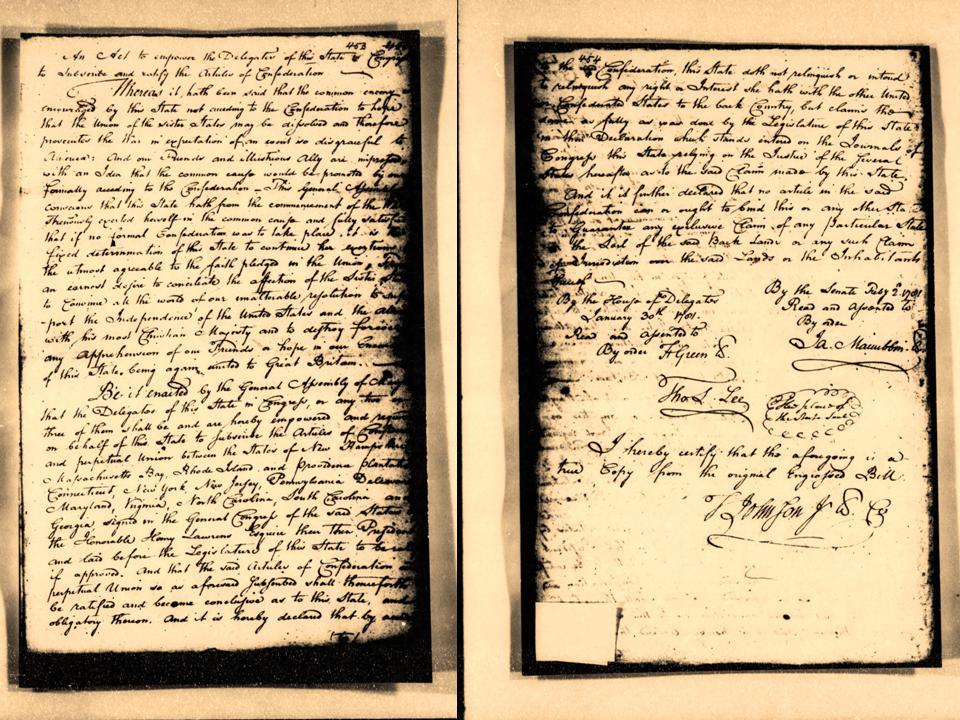
The Act of the Maryland legislature to ratify the Articles of Confederation, February 2, 1781

On February 2, 1781, the much-awaited decision was taken by the Maryland General Assembly in Annapolis. As the last piece of business during the afternoon Session, "among engrossed Bills" was "signed and sealed by Governor Thomas Sim Lee in the Senate Chamber, in the presence of the members of both Houses ... an Act to empower the delegates of this state in Congress to subscribe and ratify the articles of confederation" and perpetual union among the states. The Senate then adjourned "to the first Monday in August next." The decision of Maryland to ratify the Articles was reported to the Continental Congress on February 12. The confirmation signing of the Articles by the two Maryland delegates took place in Philadelphia at noon time on March 1, 1781, and was celebrated in the afternoon. With these events, the Articles were entered into force and the United States of America came into being as a sovereign federal state.

Congress had debated the Articles for over a year and a half, and the ratification process had taken nearly three and a half years. Many participants in the original debates were no longer delegates, and some of the signers had only recently arrived. The Articles of Confederation and Perpetual Union were signed by a group of men who were never present in the Congress at the same time.

=== Signers ===
The signers and the states they represented were:

Connecticut

- Roger Sherman
- Samuel Huntington
- Oliver Wolcott
- Titus Hosmer
- Andrew Adams

Delaware

- Thomas McKean
- John Dickinson
- Nicholas Van Dyke

Georgia

- John Walton
- Edward Telfair
- Edward Langworthy

Maryland

- John Hanson
- Daniel Carroll

Massachusetts Bay

- John Hancock
- Samuel Adams
- Elbridge Gerry
- Francis Dana
- James Lovell
- Samuel Holten

New Hampshire

- Josiah Bartlett
- John Wentworth Jr.

New Jersey

- John Witherspoon
- Nathaniel Scudder

New York

- James Duane
- Francis Lewis
- William Duer
- Gouverneur Morris

North Carolina

- John Penn
- Cornelius Harnett
- John Williams

Pennsylvania

- Robert Morris
- Daniel Roberdeau
- Jonathan Bayard Smith
- William Clingan
- Joseph Reed

Rhode Island and Providence Plantations

- William Ellery
- Henry Marchant
- John Collins

South Carolina

- Henry Laurens
- William Henry Drayton
- John Mathews
- Richard Hutson
- Thomas Heyward Jr.

Virginia

- Richard Henry Lee
- John Banister
- Thomas Adams
- John Harvie
- Francis Lightfoot Lee

Roger Sherman (Connecticut) was the only person to sign all four great state papers of the United States: the Continental Association, the United States Declaration of Independence, the Articles of Confederation and the United States Constitution.

Robert Morris (Pennsylvania) signed three of the great state papers of the United States: the United States Declaration of Independence, the Articles of Confederation and the United States Constitution.

John Dickinson (Delaware), Daniel Carroll (Maryland) and Gouverneur Morris (New York), along with Sherman and Robert Morris, were the only five people to sign both the Articles of Confederation and the United States Constitution (Gouverneur Morris represented Pennsylvania when signing the Constitution).

== Parchment pages ==
Original parchment pages of the Articles of Confederation, National Archives and Records Administration.

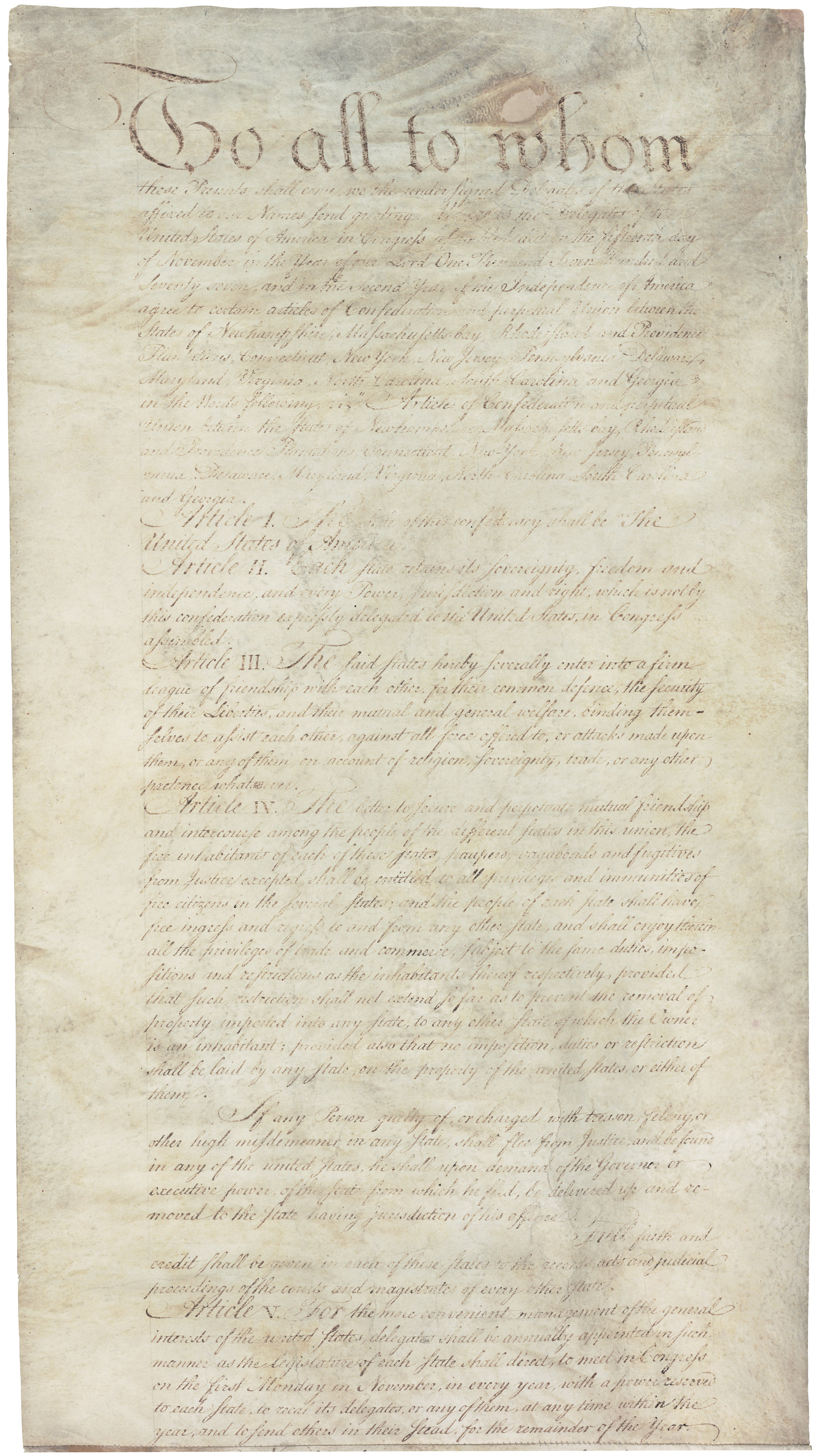
Preamble to Art. V, Sec. 1

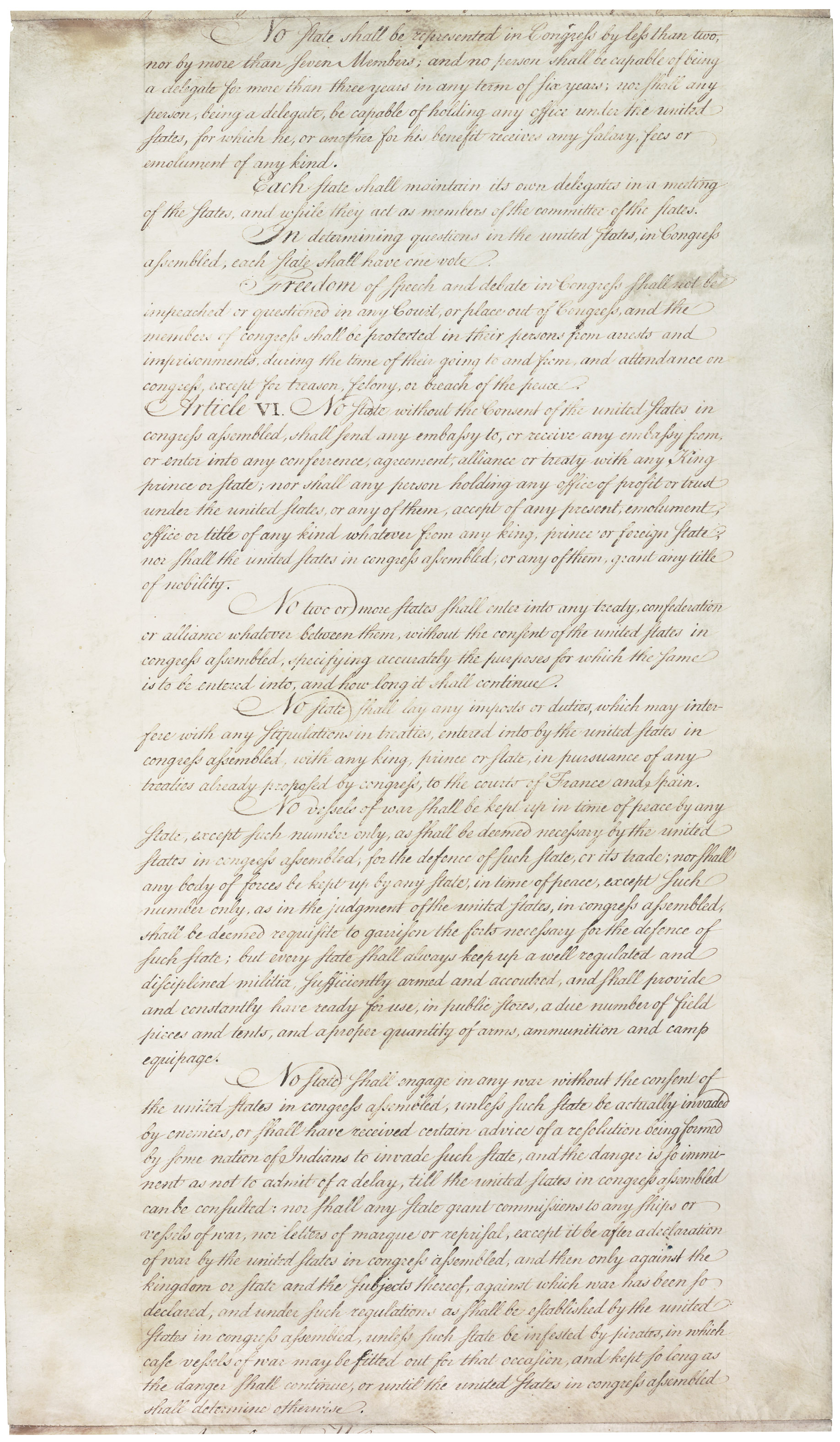
Art. V, Sec. 2 to Art. VI

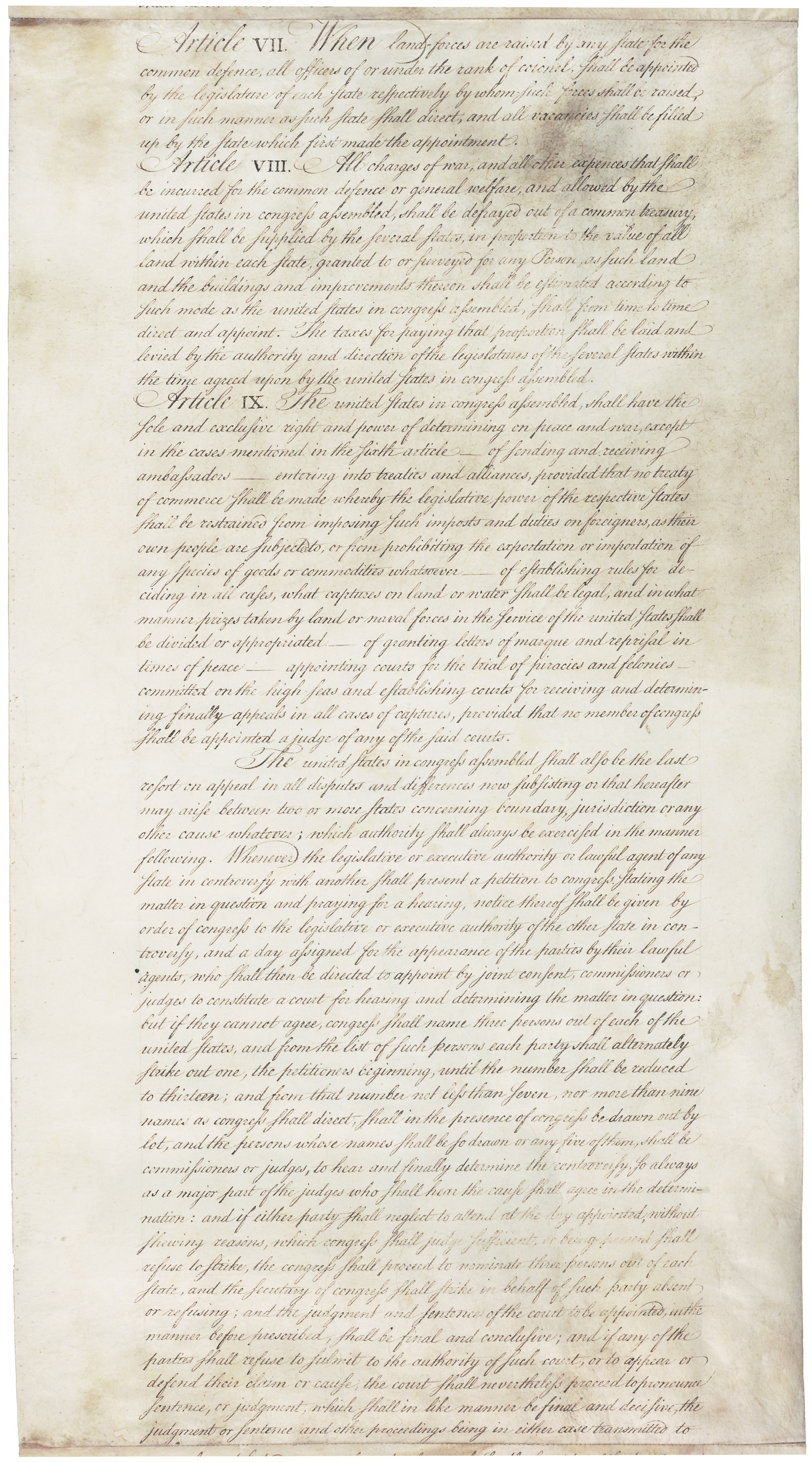
Art. VII to Art. IX, Sec. 2

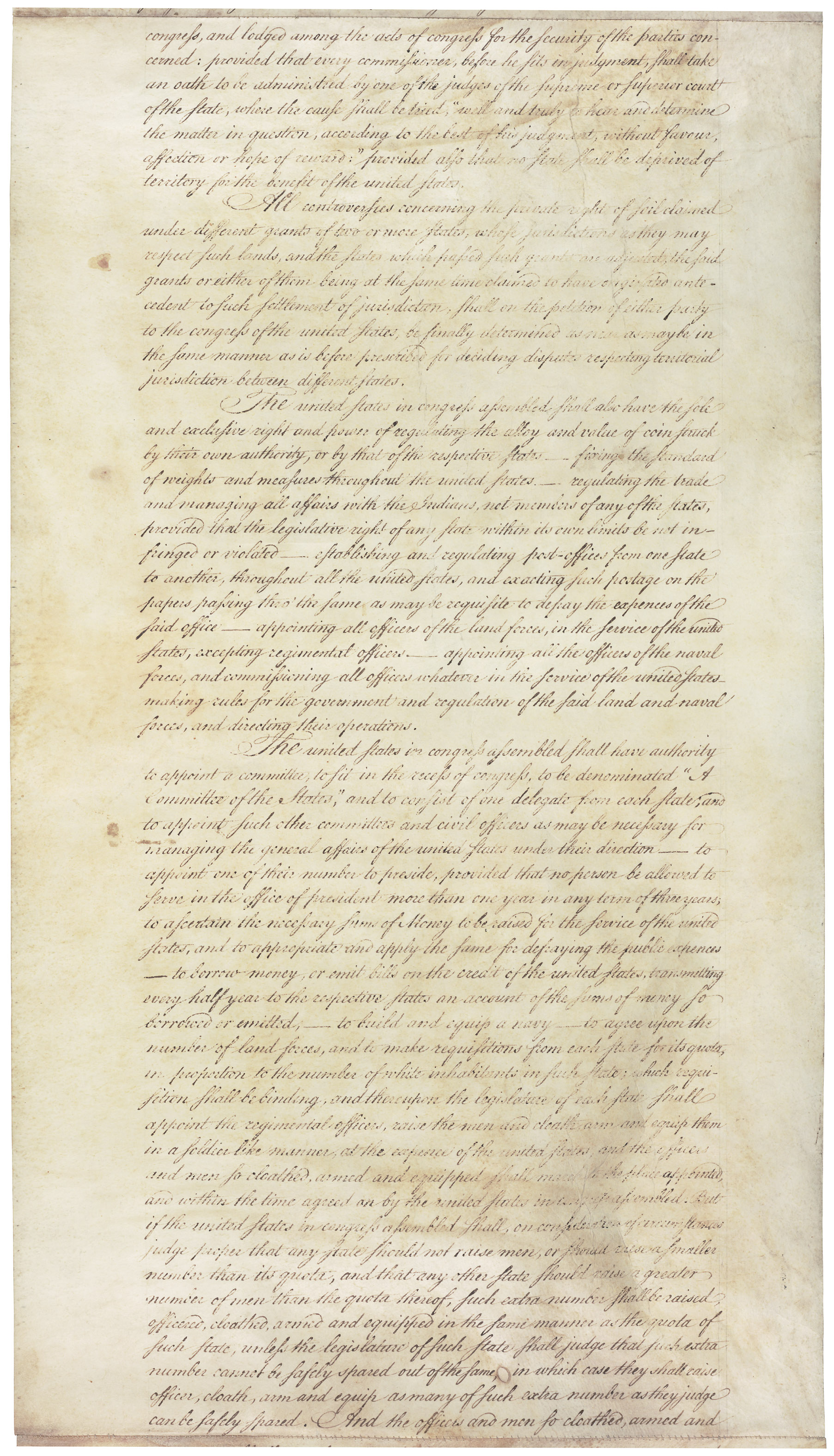
Art. IX, Sec. 2 to Sec. 5

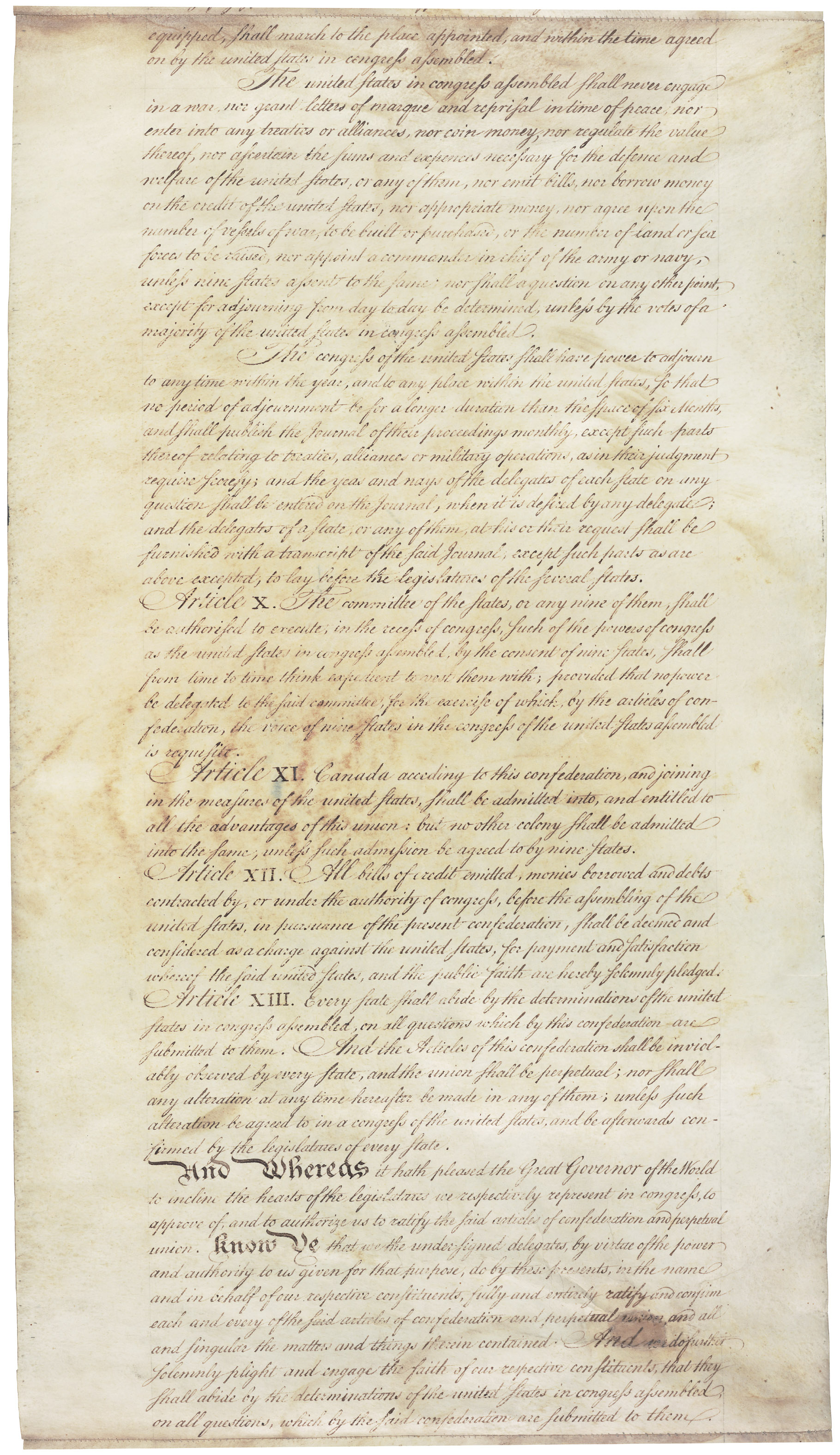
Art. IX, Sec. 5 to Art. XIII, Sec. 2

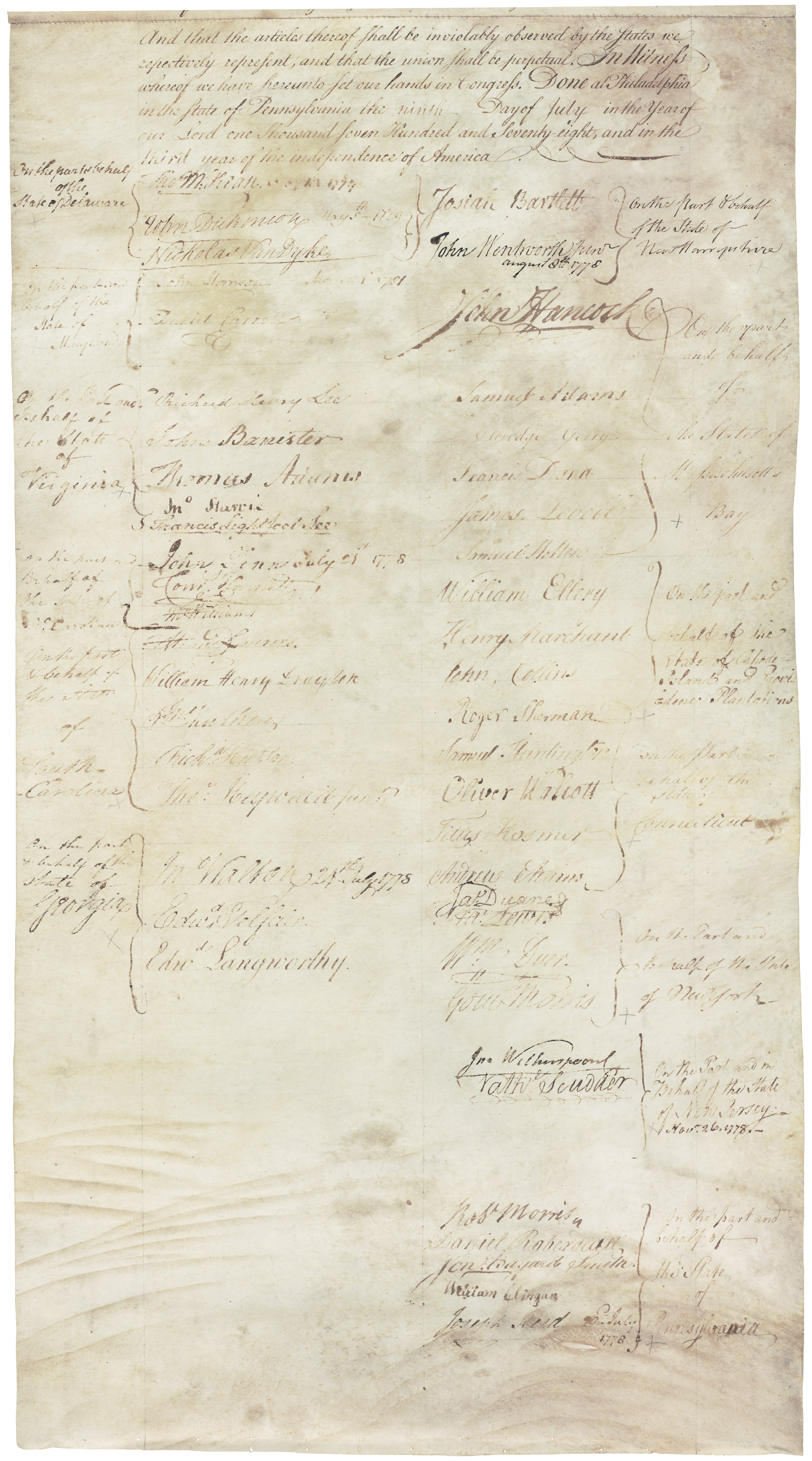
Art. XIII, Sec. 2 to signatures

== Revision and replacement ==
In September 1786, delegates from five states met at what became known as the Annapolis Convention to discuss the need for reversing the protectionist interstate trade barriers that each state had erected. At its conclusion, delegates voted to invite all states to a larger convention to be held in Philadelphia in 1787. The Confederation Congress later endorsed this convention "for the sole and express purpose of revising the Articles of Confederation". Although the states' representatives to the Constitutional Convention in Philadelphia were only authorized to amend the Articles, delegates held secret, closed-door sessions and wrote a new constitution. The new frame of government gave much more power to the central government, but characterization of the result is disputed. The general goal of the authors was to get close to a republic as defined by the philosophers of the Age of Enlightenment, while trying to address the many difficulties of the interstate relationships. Historian Forrest McDonald, using the ideas of James Madison from Federalist 39, described the change this way:

The constitutional reallocation of powers created a new form of government, unprecedented under the sun. Every previous national authority either had been centralized or else had been a confederation of sovereign states. The new American system was neither one nor the other; it was a mixture of both.

In May 1786, Charles Pinckney of South Carolina proposed that Congress revise the Articles of Confederation. Recommended changes included granting Congress power over foreign and domestic commerce, and providing means for Congress to collect money from state treasuries. Unanimous approval was necessary to make the alterations, however, and Congress failed to reach a consensus. The weakness of the Articles in establishing an effective unifying government was underscored by the threat of internal conflict both within and between the states, especially after Shays's Rebellion threatened to topple the state government of Massachusetts.

Historian Ralph Ketcham commented on the opinions of Patrick Henry, George Mason, and other Anti-Federalists who were not so eager to give up the local autonomy won by the revolution:

Antifederalists feared what Patrick Henry termed the "consolidated government" proposed by the new Constitution. They saw in Federalist hopes for commercial growth and international prestige only the lust of ambitious men for a "splendid empire" that, in the time-honored way of empires, would oppress the people with taxes, conscription, and military campaigns. Uncertain that any government over so vast a domain as the United States could be controlled by the people, Antifederalists saw in the enlarged powers of the general government only the familiar threats to the rights and liberties of the people.

Historians have given many reasons for the perceived need to replace the articles in 1787. Jillson and Wilson (1994) point to the financial weakness as well as the norms, rules and institutional structures of the Congress, and the propensity to divide along sectional lines.

Rakove identifies several factors that explain the collapse of the Confederation. The lack of compulsory direct taxation power was objectionable to those wanting a strong centralized state or expecting to benefit from such power. It could not collect customs after the war because tariffs were vetoed by Rhode Island. Rakove concludes that their failure to implement national measures "stemmed not from a heady sense of independence but rather from the enormous difficulties that all the states encountered in collecting taxes, mustering men, and gathering supplies from a war-weary populace." The second group of factors Rakove identified derived from the substantive nature of the problems the Continental Congress confronted after 1783, especially the inability to create a strong foreign policy. Finally, the Confederation's lack of coercive power reduced the likelihood for profit to be made by political means, thus potential rulers were uninspired to seek power.

When the war ended in 1783, certain special interests had incentives to create a new "merchant state", much like the British state people had rebelled against. In particular, holders of war scrip and land speculators wanted a central government to pay off scrip at face value and to legalize western land holdings with disputed claims. Also, manufacturers wanted a high tariff as a barrier to foreign goods, but competition among states made this impossible without a central government.

=== Legitimacy of closing down ===
Two prominent political leaders in the Confederation, John Jay of New York and Thomas Burke of North Carolina, believed that "the authority of the congress rested on the prior acts of the several states, to which the states gave their voluntary consent, and until those obligations were fulfilled, neither nullification of the authority of congress, exercising its due powers, nor secession from the compact itself was consistent with the terms of their original pledges."

According to Article XIII of the Confederation, any alteration had to be approved unanimously:

[T]he Articles of this Confederation shall be inviolably observed by every State, and the Union shall be perpetual; nor shall any alteration at any time hereafter be made in any of them; unless such alteration be agreed to in a Congress of the United States, and be afterwards confirmed by the legislatures of every State.

On the other hand, Article VII of the proposed Constitution stated that it would become effective after ratification by a mere nine states, without unanimity:

The Ratification of the Conventions of nine States, shall be sufficient for the Establishment of this Constitution between the States so ratifying the Same.

The apparent tension between these two provisions was addressed at the time, and remains a topic of scholarly discussion. In 1788, James Madison remarked (in Federalist No. 40) that the issue had become moot: "As this objection ... has been in a manner waived by those who have criticised the powers of the convention, I dismiss it without further observation." Nevertheless, it is a historical and legal question whether opponents of the Constitution could have plausibly attacked the Constitution on that ground. At the time, there were state legislators who argued that the Constitution was not an alteration of the Articles of Confederation, but rather would be a complete replacement so the unanimity rule did not apply. Moreover, the Confederation had proven woefully inadequate and therefore was supposedly no longer binding.

Modern scholars such as Francisco Forrest Martin agree that the Articles of Confederation had lost its binding force because many states had violated it, and thus "other states-parties did not have to comply with the Articles' unanimous consent rule". In contrast, law professor Akhil Amar suggests that there may not have really been any conflict between the Articles of Confederation and the Constitution on this point; Article VI of the Confederation specifically allowed side deals among states, and the Constitution could be viewed as a side deal until all states ratified it.

=== Final months ===
On July 3, 1788, the Congress received New Hampshire's all-important ninth ratification of the proposed Constitution, thus, according to its terms, establishing it as the new framework of governance for the ratifying states. The following day delegates considered a bill to admit Kentucky into the Union as a sovereign state. The discussion ended with Congress making the determination that, in light of this development, it would be "unadvisable" to admit Kentucky into the Union, as it could do so "under the Articles of Confederation" only, but not "under the Constitution".

By the end of July 1788, 11 of the 13 states had ratified the new Constitution. Congress continued to convene under the Articles with a quorum until October. On Saturday, September 13, 1788, the Confederation Congress voted the resolve to implement the new Constitution, and on Monday, September 15 published an announcement that the new Constitution had been ratified by the necessary nine states, set the first Wednesday in January 1789 for appointing electors, set the first Wednesday in February 1789 for the presidential electors to meet and vote for a new president, and set the first Wednesday of March 1789 as the day "for commencing proceedings" under the new Constitution. On that same September 13, it determined that New York would remain the national capital.

== See also ==
- Court of Appeals in Cases of Capture
- Founding Fathers of the United States
- Journals of the Continental Congress
- History of the United States (1776–1789)
- Libertarianism
- Perpetual Union
- Vetocracy

== General and cited references ==
- Armitage, David (2004). "The Declaration of Independence in World Context". Magazine of History. 18 (3). Organization of American Historians: 61–66. doi:10.1093/maghis/18.3.61.
- Bernstein, R.B. (1999). "Parliamentary Principles, American Realities: The Continental and Confederation Congresses, 1774–1789". In Bowling, Kenneth R. & Kennon, Donald R. (eds.). Inventing Congress: Origins & Establishment Of First Federal Congress. pp. 76–108.
- Brown, Roger H. (1993). Redeeming the Republic: Federalists, Taxation, and the Origins of the Constitution. Johns Hopkins University Press. ISBN 9780801863554.
- Burnett, Edmund Cody (1941). The Continental Congress: A Definitive History of the Continental Congress From Its Inception in 1774 to March 1789.
- Chadwick, Bruce (2005). George Washington's War. Sourcebooks. ISBN 9781402226106.
- Dougherty, Keith L. (2009). "An Empirical Test of Federalist and Anti-Federalist Theories of State Contributions, 1775–1783". Social Science History. 33 (1): 47–74. doi:10.1215/01455532-2008-015 (inactive September 24, 2025).
- Feinberg, Barbara (2002). The Articles Of Confederation. Twenty First Century Books. ISBN 9780761321149.
- Ferling, John (2003). A Leap in the Dark: The Struggle to Create the American Republic. Oxford University Press. ISBN 978-0-19-515924-0.
- Ferling, John (2010). John Adams: A Life. Oxford University Press, USA. ISBN 9780199752737.
- Frankel, Benjamin (2003). History in Dispute: The American Revolution, 1763–1789. St. James Press. pp. 17–24.
- Greene, Jack P. & Pole, J. R., eds. (2003). A Companion to the American Revolution (2nd ed.). Wiley. ISBN 9781405116749.
- Hendrickson, David C. (2003). Peace Pact: The Lost World of the American Founding. University Press of Kansas. ISBN 0700612378.
- Hoffert, Robert W. (1992). A Politics of Tensions: The Articles of Confederation and American Political Ideas. University Press of Colorado.
- Horgan, Lucille E. (2002). Forged in War: The Continental Congress and the Origin of Military Supply and Acquisition Policy. Praeger Pub Text. ISBN 9780313321610.
- Jensen, Merrill (1959) [1940]. The Articles of Confederation: An Interpretation of the Social-Constitutional History of the American Revolution, 1774–1781. University of Wisconsin Press. ISBN 9780299002046.
- Jensen, Merrill (1950). The New Nation: A History of the United States during the Confederation, 1781-1789. Northeastern University Press. ISBN 9780930350147.
- Jensen, Merrill (1943). "The Idea of a National Government During the American Revolution". Political Science Quarterly. 58 (3): 356–379. doi:10.2307/2144490. JSTOR 2144490.
- Jillson, Calvin & Wilson, Rick K. (1994). Congressional Dynamics: Structure, Coordination, and Choice in the First American Congress, 1774–1789. Stanford University Press. ISBN 9780804722933.
- Klos, Stanley L. (2004). President Who? Forgotten Founders. Pittsburgh: Evisum. p. 261. ISBN 0975262750.
- Lodge, Henry Cabot (1893). George Washington, Vol. I. Vol. I.
- Maier, Pauline (2010). Ratification: The People Debate the Constitution, 1787-1788. New York: Simon & Schuster. ISBN 978-0684868547.
- Main, Jackson T. (1974). Political Parties before the Constitution. W W Norton & Company. ISBN 9780393007183.
- McDonald, Forrest (1986). Novus Ordo Seclorum: The Intellectual Origins of the Constitution. University Press of Kansas. ISBN 0700603115.
- McLaughlin, Andrew C. (1935). A Constitutional History of the United States. Simon Publications. ISBN 9781931313315.
- McNeese, Tim (2009). Revolutionary America 1764–1799. Chelsea House Publishers. ISBN 9781604133509.
- Morris, Richard B. (1987). The Forging of the Union, 1781–1789. Harper & Row. p. 245–66. ISBN 9780060914240.
- Morris, Richard (1988). The Forging of the Union, 1781–1789. New American Nation Series. HarperCollins Publishers.
- Morison, Samuel Eliot (1965). The Oxford History of the American People. New York: Oxford University Press.
- Murrin, John M. (2008). Liberty, Equality, Power, A History of the American People: To 1877. Wadsworth Publishing Company. ISBN 9781111830861.
- Nevins, Allan (1924). The American States During and After the Revolution, 1775–1789. New York: Macmillan.
- Paine, Thomas (1776). "Common Sense". In Foner, Eric (ed.). Paine: Collected Writings. The Library of America. ISBN 9781428622005. (Collection published 1995.)
- Parent, Joseph M. (Fall 2009). "Europe's Structural Idol: An American Federalist Republic?". Political Science Quarterly. 124 (3): 513–535. doi:10.1002/j.1538-165x.2009.tb00658.x.
- Phelps, Glenn A. (2001). "The Republican General". In Higginbotham, Don (ed.). George Washington Reconsidered. University of Virginia Press. ISBN 0813920051.
- Puls, Mark (2008). Henry Knox: Visionary General of the American Revolution. Palgrave MacMillan. ISBN 978-1403984272.
- Rakove, Jack N. (1982). The Beginnings of National Politics: An Interpretive History of the Continental Congress. Johns Hopkins University Press.
- Rakove, Jack N. (1991) "The Articles of Confederation, 1775–1783. In Jack P. Green and J.R. Pole, eds. The Blackwell Encyclopedia of the American Revolution. Oxford: Blackwell pp. 280–95. ISBN 1-55786-244-3
- Rakove, Jack N. (1988). "The Collapse of the Articles of Confederation". In Barlow, J. Jackson; Levy, Leonard W. & Masugi, Ken (eds.). The American Founding: Essays on the Formation of the Constitution. Bloomsbury Academic. ISBN 9780313256103.
- Satō, Shōsuke (1886). History of the land question in the United States. Baltimore, Maryland: Isaac Friedenwald, for Johns Hopkins University.
- Stahr, Walter (2005). John Jay. Bloomsbury Academic. ISBN 0826418791.
- Van Cleve, George William (2017). We Have Not a Government: The Articles of Confederation and the Road to the Constitution. Chicago, Illinois: University of Chicago Press. ISBN 9780226480503.
- Williams, Frederick D. (2012). The Northwest Ordinance: Essays on its Formulation, Provisions, and Legacy. East Lansing, Mich.: Michigan State University Press. ISBN 978-0-87013-969-7.
- Wood, Gordon S. (1969). The Creation of the American Republic: 1776–1787. University of North Carolina Press.
