= Engagements Clause =

Legal history of the United States

The Engagements Clause of the United States Constitution (Article VI, Clause 1) says that debts and other obligations of the federal government that were incurred during the years when the Articles of Confederation served as the constitution of the United States continue to be valid after the Articles were superseded by the new Constitution.

== The role of the Articles of Confederation ==
The Articles of Confederation and Perpetual Union were proposed by the Continental Congress in 1777 and became effective upon ratification by all thirteen states. The thirteenth ratification was in March 1781. The Articles elevated the Congress to the status of a federal government. The Congress of the Confederation commissioned the Constitutional Convention to meet in 1787 to propose improvements to the Articles of Confederation, with the result that they proposed the new Constitution, which superseded the Articles within the states ratifying it, upon ratification by nine of the thirteen states.

== Text ==
All Debts contracted and Engagements entered into, before the Adoption of this Constitution, shall be as valid against the United States under this Constitution, as under the Confederation.

== The precursor in the Articles of Confederation ==
The twelfth Article of Confederation was also an engagements clause, committing the Confederation to honor promises made by the Continental Congress before the Congress of the Confederation convened. It stated that "All bills of credit emitted, monies borrowed, and debts contracted by or under the authority of Congress, before the assembling of the United States, in pursuance of the present confederation, shall be deemed and considered as a charge against the United States, for payment and satisfaction whereof the said United States and the public faith are hereby solemnly pledged."
