= William Clingan =

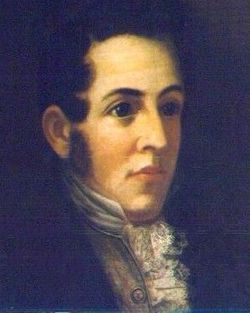
- Born: c. 1721; Scotland
- Died: May 9, 1790 (aged 69); Chester County, Pennsylvania, U.S.
- Resting place: Upper Octorara Presbyterian Church Cemetery, Parkesburg, Pennsylvania
- Occupations: Lawyer, Jurist, Politician
- Known for: Signer of the Articles of Confederation
- Spouse(s): Catherine Clingan (died 1785); Rachel Clingan
- Children: 11

https://www.chesco.org/DocumentCenter/View/84646/William-Clingan

William Clingan (c.1721 – May 9, 1790) was a Founding Father of the United States, lawyer, and jurist. As a delegate in the Continental Congress for Pennsylvania from 1777 to 1779, he signed the Articles of Confederation. Upon his death he was buried in the Upper Octorara Church Cemetery in Parkesburg, Pennsylvania.

William Clingan and his brother immigrated to the Colonies from Scotland. His last name, Clingan, came from the Scottish surname of MacClingan. Much regarding his life is unknown.
