= Proposals for concerted operation among the powers at war with the Pyratical states of Barbary =

1786 diplomatic note by Thomas Jefferson

"Proposals for concerted operation among the powers at war with the Pyratical states of Barbary" was the title of an identic note written by Thomas Jefferson in 1786, when he was the American ambassador to France. It proposed an intergovernmental military alliance for purposes of instituting a naval blockade of the Ottoman Regency of Algiers, which allowed the Barbary pirates to attack ships. The alliance was opposed by Congress and was never implemented.

== Background ==
Pirates operating from North Africa, with the consent of the Dey of Algiers and the rulers of other Barbary states, had been attacking shipping in the Mediterranean since the 1600s. Beginning in the 1700s, European powers negotiated treaties with the Dey to control the pirates in exchange for lavish tributes. The United States first negotiated treaties with Algiers and the other Barbary states in 1784.

== Proposal ==
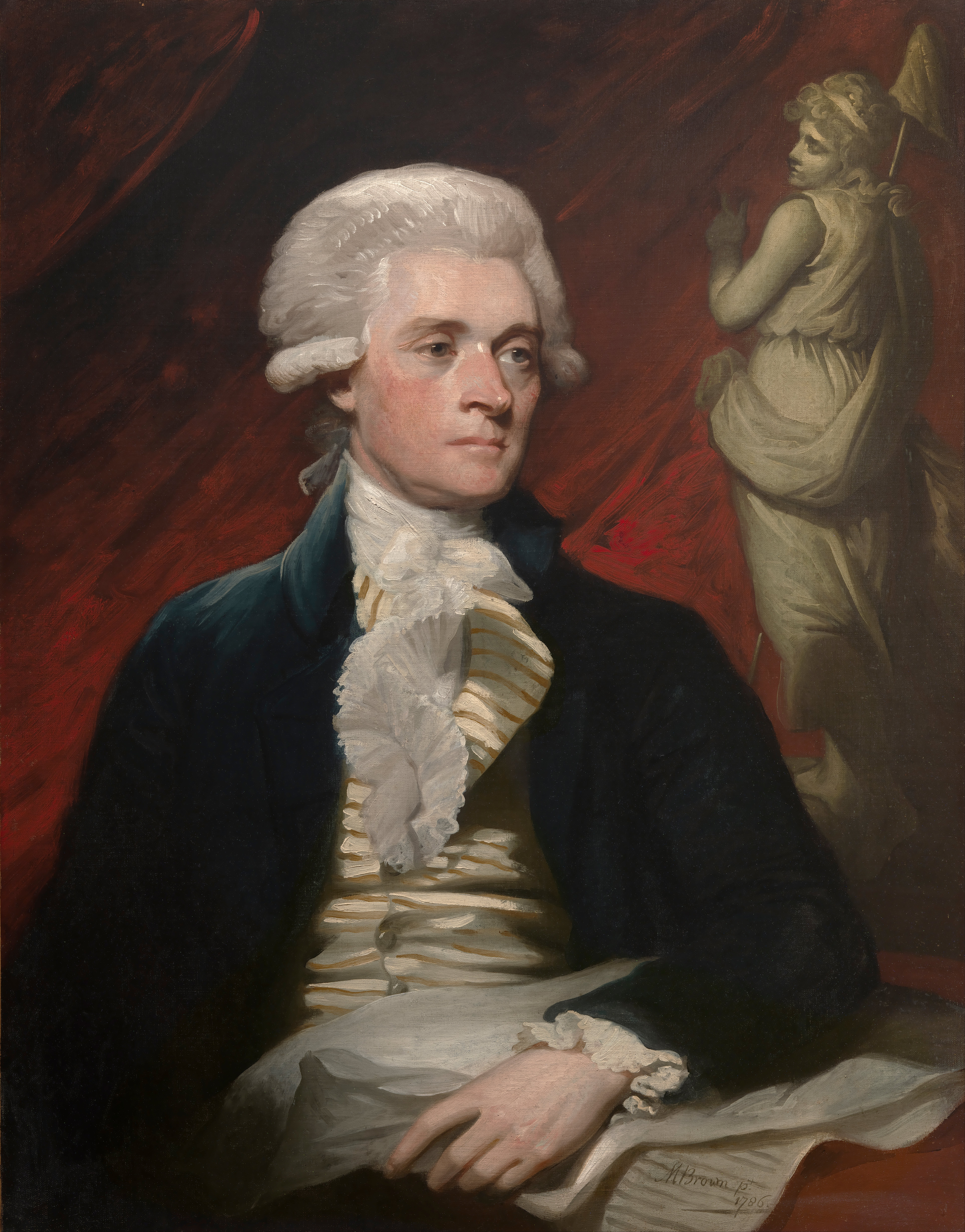
Thomas Jefferson—depicted here in a painting by Mather Brown in 1786—proposed an international military force to fight the Barbary states.

Under Jefferson's proposal, each state party that entered the alliance would contribute at least one frigate to a combined naval flotilla situated in the Mediterranean Sea, as well as tenders and other support vessels. Governance of the force would be vested in a council of ministers, consisting of delegates from each state party, to be seated in Versailles and in which delegates would hold votes in proportion to the contributions to the force of the states they represented. Once constituted, the alliance would go to war against Algiers and, upon its defeat, refocus its efforts on other Barbary states. Article IX of the circular suggested binding signatories to continue in the alliance even if war broke out among two or more of them.

== Response ==
According to Jefferson's autobiography, Portugal, Naples, Venice, the Two Sicilies, France, Malta, Sweden, and Denmark all responded favorably to the proposal, while Spain and Britain were "doubtful" on the question. Congress, however, expressed opposition to the idea, possibly as a result of lobbying by John Adams and John Jay, and the matter ultimately died.

Depredations against American and European shipping increased in severity in the following years, as did the size of the tributes the rulers of the Barbary states demanded. In June 1800, Sweden and Denmark approached the United States with the idea of a tri-national naval flotilla to escort Swedish, Danish, and American ships during transits of the Mediterranean. President of the United States John Adams rejected the proposal, preferring instead to continue paying tributes. The following year, upon Jefferson's ascension to the presidency, American policy changed and the United States went to war against Algiers, Tripoli, and Tunis in the First Barbary War.

== See also ==
- Barbary Wars
- Collective security
- History of the United States (1776–1789)
- Hostis humani generis
- NATO
