= Aide-mémoire =

Diplomatic note

In diplomatic correspondence, an aide-mémoire is a proposed agreement or negotiating text circulated informally among delegations for discussion without committing the originating delegation's country to the contents. It has no identified source, title, or attribution and no standing in the relationship involved. Such a text is also referred to as a non-paper in many international organizations, including the General Agreement on Tariffs and Trade/World Trade Organization and sometimes within the European Union.

== See also ==
- Note verbale
