= Electoral history of John Adams =

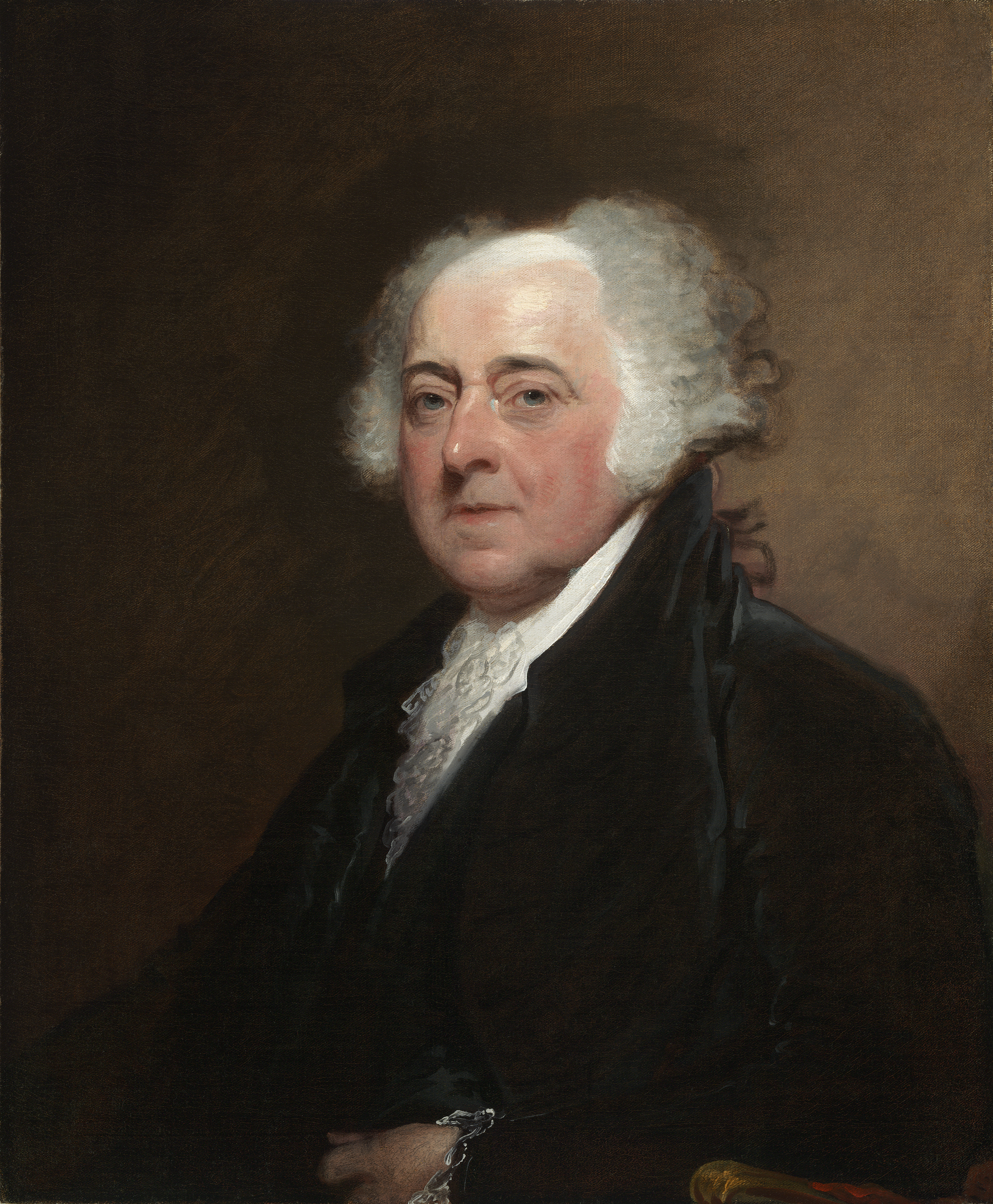
John Adams between 1800- 1815

John Adams, a Founding Father of the United States, was the country's second president (1797–1801) and its first vice president (1789–1797). Prior to being president, he had diplomatic experience as the second United States envoy to France (1777–1779), the first United States minister to the Netherlands (1782–1788), and the first United States minister to the United Kingdom (1785–1788). After losing the 1800 presidential election to Thomas Jefferson, he would mostly retire from political life, with his second youngest son, John Quincy Adams (1767–1848), being elected as the sixth president of the United States (1825–1829) in the 1824 presidential election.

== United States presidential elections ==
=== 1788–89 ===
The first U.S. presidential election was held over a period of weeks from December 1788 to January 1789. Adams was elected with 34 of the 69 first-round votes cast in the United States Electoral College. Since Adams got the second most electoral votes, he was elected to serve as the first vice president of the United States under President George Washington.

No popular vote totals are listed in this table. In early elections, many electors were chosen by state legislatures instead of public balloting, and votes were cast for undifferentiated lists of candidates in those states which practiced public balloting, leaving no or only partial vote totals.

1788-89 Electoral votes by state

Presidential candidate	Party	Home state	Popular vote^{(a), (b), (c)}		Electoral vote^{(d), (e), (f)}
Presidential candidate	Party	Home state	Count	Percentage	Electoral vote^{(d), (e), (f)}
George Washington	Independent	Virginia	43,782	100.0%	69
John Adams	Federalist	Massachusetts	—	—	34
John Jay	Federalist	New York	—	—	9
Robert H. Harrison	Federalist	Maryland	—	—	6
John Rutledge	Federalist	South Carolina	—	—	6
John Hancock	Federalist	Massachusetts	—	—	4
George Clinton	Anti-Federalist	New York	—	—	3
Samuel Huntington	Federalist	Connecticut	—	—	2
John Milton	Federalist	Georgia	—	—	2
James Armstrong^{(g)}	Federalist	Georgia^{(g)}	—	—	1
Benjamin Lincoln	Federalist	Massachusetts	—	—	1
Edward Telfair	Anti-Federalist	Georgia	—	—	1
Total			43,782	100.0%	138
Needed to win					35

^{(a)} Only 6 of the 10 states casting electoral votes chose electors by any form of the popular vote.

^{(b)} Less than 1.8% of the population voted: the 1790 Census would count a total population of 3.0 million with a free population of 2.4 million and 600,000 slaves in those states casting electoral votes.

^{(c)} Those states that did choose electors by popular vote had widely varying restrictions on suffrage via property requirements.

^{(d)} As the New York legislature failed to appoint its allotted eight electors in time, there were no voting electors from New York.

^{(e)} Two electors from Maryland did not vote.

^{(f)} One elector from Virginia did not vote and another elector from Virginia was not chosen because an election district failed to submit returns.

^{(g)} The identity of this candidate comes from The Documentary History of the First Federal Elections (Gordon DenBoer (ed.), University of Wisconsin Press, 1984, p. 441). Several respected sources, including the Biographical Directory of the United States Congress and the Political Graveyard, instead show this individual to be James Armstrong of Pennsylvania. However, primary sources, such as the Senate Journal, list only Armstrong's name, not his state. Skeptics observe that Armstrong received his single vote from a Georgia elector. They find this improbable because Armstrong of Pennsylvania was not nationally famous—his public service to that date consisted of being a medical officer during the American Revolution and, at most, a single year as a Pennsylvania judge.

Source: "Electoral College Box Scores 1789–1996". National Archives and Records Administration. Source (popular vote): A New Nation Votes: American Election Returns 1787–1825

=== 1792 ===
1792 Electoral votes by state

Adams would be re-elected to the vice-presidency in 1792, with Adams was elected with 77 of the 132 first-round votes cast in the United States Electoral College.

Presidential candidate	Party	Home state	Popular vote^{(a)}		Electoral vote^{(b)}
Presidential candidate	Party	Home state	Count	Percentage	Electoral vote^{(b)}
George Washington (incumbent)	Independent	Virginia	28,579	100.0%	132
John Adams	Federalist	Massachusetts	—	—	77
George Clinton	Democratic-Republican	New York	—	—	50
Thomas Jefferson	Democratic-Republican	Virginia	—	—	4
Aaron Burr	Democratic-Republican	New York	—	—	1
Total			28,579	100.0%	264
Needed to win					67

=== 1796 ===
1796 Electoral votes by state

The 1796 presidential election was the third presidential election in U.S History and was the first one to be contested between two separate parties, the Democratic-Republicans who nominated former Secretary of State Thomas Jefferson for the presidency, and the Federalist Party who had nominated Adams. Adams had selected former Governor of South Carolina, Thomas Pinckney, as his vice-presidential running mate in the Federalist Party ticket, while Jefferson nominated New York Senator Aaron Burr as his vice presidential running mate in the Democratic-Republican ticket.

Adams beat Jefferson in the 1796 election, with Adams being elected with 71 of the 138 first-round votes cast in the United States Electoral College. Jefferson, however, would come in second place being elected vice-president with 68 of the 138 first-round votes cast in the United States Electoral College, defeating Adams' VP nominee Thomas Pinckney who got 55 of the 138 first-round votes cast in the United States Electoral College. This would also be the only election in U.S History where the Federalist candidate won the election.

Presidential candidate	Party	Home state	Popular vote^{(a), (b), (c)}		Electoral vote
Presidential candidate	Party	Home state	Count	Percentage	Electoral vote
John Adams	Federalist	Massachusetts	35,726	53.4%	71
Thomas Jefferson	Democratic-Republican	Virginia	31,115	46.6%	68
Thomas Pinckney	Federalist	South Carolina	—	—	59
Aaron Burr	Democratic-Republican	New York	—	—	30
Samuel Adams	Democratic-Republican	Massachusetts	—	—	15
Oliver Ellsworth	Federalist	Connecticut	—	—	11
George Clinton	Democratic-Republican	New York	—	—	7
John Jay	Federalist	New York	—	—	5
James Iredell	Federalist	North Carolina	—	—	3
George Washington	Independent	Virginia	—	—	2
John Henry	Federalist	Maryland	—	—	2
Samuel Johnston	Federalist	North Carolina	—	—	2
Charles Cotesworth Pinckney	Federalist	South Carolina	—	—	1
Total			66,841	100.0%	276
Needed to win					70

=== 1800 ===
1800 Electoral votes by state

The 1800 presidential election was a rematch between incumbent President Adams and incumbent Vice-president Jefferson. It is the only election in U.S History between an incumbent president and an incumbent vice-president.

Adams had selected former United States Minister to France Charles C. Pinckney (1746–1825), as his vice-presidential running mate in the Federalist Party ticket, while Jefferson nominated former New York Senator Aaron Burr (1756–1836) as his vice-presidential running mate in the Democratic-Republican ticket.

Jefferson would win 73 of the 138 first-round votes cast in the United States Electoral College, while Adams won 65 of the 138 first-round votes cast in the United States Electoral College making Jefferson the third president of the United States (1801–1809), and Burr the third vice-president of the United States (1801–1805). It also made Jefferson the second consecutive president to have previously served as VP and Adams the first U.S. president to only serve one term.

Presidential candidate	Party	Home state	Popular vote^{(a), (b), (c)}		Electoral vote
Presidential candidate	Party	Home state	Count	Percentage	Electoral vote
Thomas Jefferson	Democratic-Republican	Virginia	45,467	60.5%	73
Aaron Burr	Democratic-Republican	New York	—	—	73
John Adams (incumbent)	Federalist	Massachusetts	29,621	39.4%	65
Charles Cotesworth Pinckney	Federalist	South Carolina	—	—	64
John Jay	Federalist	New York	—	—	1
Other^{(d)}			54	0.1%	0
Total			75,142	100.0%	276
Needed to win					70
