= 1788–89 United States presidential election in Maryland =

- January 7, 1789
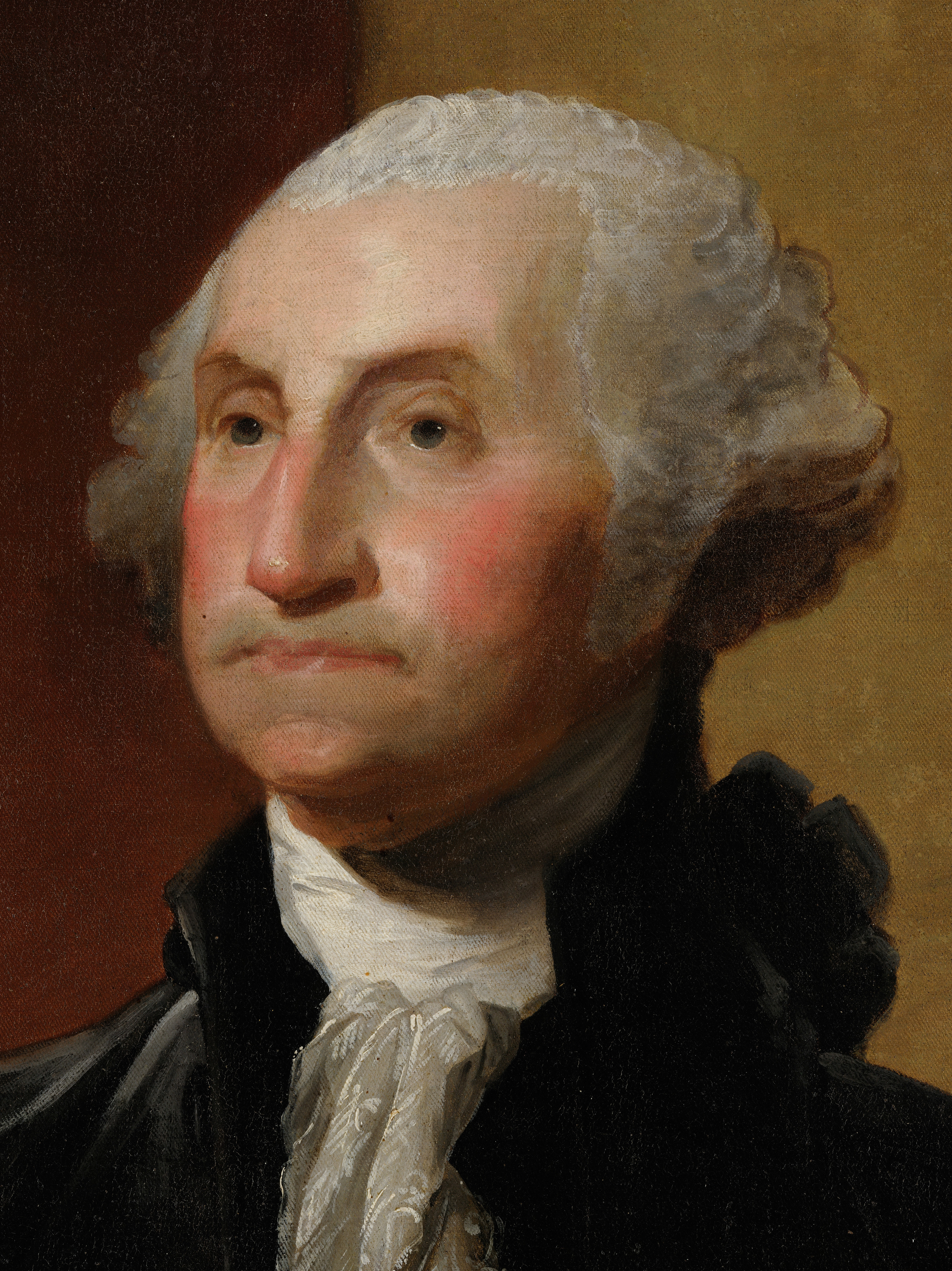

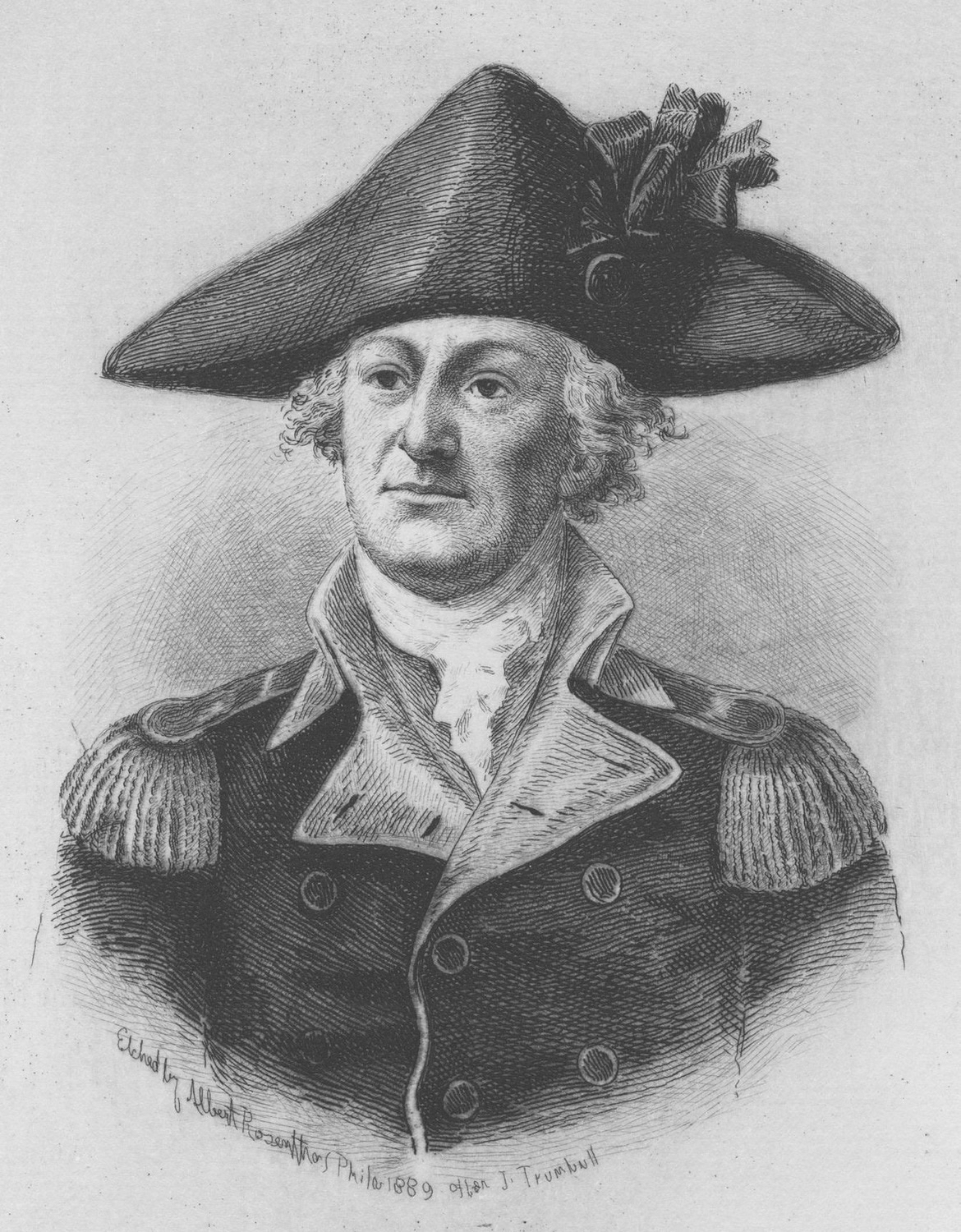
Nominee	George Washington	Robert H. Harrison
Party	Independent	Federalists
Home state	Virginia	Maryland
Electoral vote	6 (8)	6
Popular vote	7,706
Percentage	100.00%
County results
Washington/Harrison (Federalist)
50–60%
60–70%
70–80%
80–90%
90–100%
Washington/Clinton (Anti-Federalist)
60–70%
President before election
Office established
Elected President
George Washington
Independent

A presidential election was held in Maryland on January 7, 1789, as part of the 1788–1789 United States presidential election to elect the first President. Voters chose eight representatives, or electors, to the Electoral College, who voted for president and vice president. However, two electors did not vote.

Early elections were quite different from modern ones. Voters voted for individual electors, who were pledged to vote for certain candidates. Often, which candidate an elector intended to support was unclear. Prior to the ratification of the 12th amendment, each elector did not distinguish between a vote cast for president and Vice President and simply cast two votes.

All electors were pledged to Washington, but there was a Federalist slate which supported Robert Hanson Harrison for vice president and an Anti-Federalist slate which supported George Clinton for vice president. Additionally, there were two electors supported by both parties. Maryland chose the Federalist electors over the Anti-Federalist electors by a large margin. The two highest electors John Rogers and George Plater, were supported by both parties, with both electors receiving 7,665 and 7,573 total votes respectively. John Rogers voted for federalist Robert Hanson Harrison, while George Plater and one other elected candidate, William Richardson, did not cast a vote. Despite not casting a vote, George was still a federalist. The highest Federalist elector, Alexander C. Hanson, received 5,596 votes. The highest Anti-Federalist elector, Jeremiah T. Chase, received 2,278 votes.

== Results by presidential candidates ==
1788-89 United States presidential election in Maryland
Party	Candidate	Votes	%
Independent	George Washington	7,706	100.00%
Total votes		7,706	100.00%

=== Results by county ===
1788–89 United States presidential election in Maryland
County	George Washington Independent		Margin		Total (Note: Results for George Washington are taken from the highest voted elector with either a formal ticket pledge, or a submitted electoral vote, for each county.)
County	#	%	#	%	Total
Anne Arundel	678	100.00%	678	100.00%	678
Baltimore	745	100.00%	745	100.00%	745
Baltimore Town	843	100.00%	843	100.00%	843
Calvert	258	100.00%	258	100.00%	258
Caroline	129	100.00%	129	100.00%	129
Cecil	519	100.00%	519	100.00%	519
Charles	190	100.00%	190	100.00%	190
Dorchester	114	100.00%	114	100.00%	114
Frederick	790	100.00%	790	100.00%	790
Harford	444	100.00%	444	100.00%	444
Kent	209	100.00%	209	100.00%	209
Montgomery	322	100.00%	322	100.00%	322
Prince George's	510	100.00%	510	100.00%	510
Queen Anne's	55	100.00%	55	100.00%	55
St. Mary's	116	100.00%	116	100.00%	116
Somerset	212	100.00%	212	100.00%	212
Talbot	254	100.00%	254	100.00%	254
Washington	1,164	100.00%	1,164	100.00%	1,164
Worcester	154	100.00%	154	100.00%	154
Total	7,706	100.00%	7,706	100.00%	7,706

=== Results by district ===
1788-89 United States presidential election in Maryland
District	E.V.	George Washington Independent			Margin		Total (Note: Results for George Washington are taken from the highest voted elector with either a formal ticket pledge, or a submitted electoral vote, for each district.)
District	E.V.	#	%	E.V.	#	%	Total
1st	8	564	100.00%	6	564	100.00%	564
2nd	8	1,037	100.00%	6	1,037	100.00%	1,037
3rd	8	1,188	100.00%	6	1,188	100.00%	1,188
4th	8	2,032	100.00%	6	2,032	100.00%	2,032
5th	8	609	100.00%	6	609	100.00%	609
6th	8	2,276	100.00%	6	2,276	100.00%	2,276
Total	8	7,706	100.00%	6	7,706	100.00%	7,706

== Results by presidential electors ==
1788-89 United States presidential election in Maryland
Party	Candidate	Votes	%
Federalists	Federalists electors	5,937	70.08%
Anti-Federalists	Anti-Federalists electors	2,535	29.92%
Total votes		8,472	100.00%

=== Results by county ===
1788–89 United States presidential election in Maryland
County	Federalist electors		Anti-Federalist electors		Margin		Total (Note: Results are taken from the highest voted Federalist, and Anti-Federalist elector for each county.)
County	#	%	#	%	#	%	Total
Anne Arundel	246	30.87%	551	69.13%	-305	-38.26%	797
Baltimore	152	18.65%	663	81.35%	-511	-62.70%	815
Baltimore Town	491	56.44%	379	43.56%	112	12.88%	870
Calvert	168	62.92%	99	37.08%	69	25.84%	267
Caroline	128	99.22%	1	0.78%	127	98.44%	129
Cecil	519	100.00%	0	0.00%	519	100.00%	519
Charles	152	91.02%	15	8.98%	137	82.04%	167
Dorchester	114	62.64%	68	37.36%	46	25.28%	182
Frederick	790	99.62%	3	0.38%	787	99.24%	793
Harford	439	64.56%	241	35.44%	198	29.12%	680
Kent	209	79.77%	53	20.23%	156	59.54%	262
Montgomery	321	87.95%	44	12.05%	277	75.90%	365
Prince George's	273	52.91%	243	47.09%	30	5.82%	516
Queen Anne's	51	51.00%	49	49.00%	2	2.00%	100
St. Mary's	100	71.94%	39	28.06%	61	43.88%	139
Somerset	212	99.07%	2	0.93%	210	98.14%	214
Talbot	254	100.00%	0	0.00%	254	100.00%	254
Washington	1,164	100.00%	0	0.00%	1,164	100.00%	1,164
Worcester	154	64.44%	85	35.56%	69	28.88%	239
Total	5,937	70.08%	2,535	29.92%	3,402	40.16%	8,472

=== Results by district ===
1788-89 United States presidential election in Maryland
District	E.V.	Federalist electors			Anti-Federalist electors			Margin		Total (Note: Results are taken from the highest voted Federalist, and Anti-Federalist elector for each district.)
District	E.V.	#	%	E.V.	#	%	E.V.	#	%	Total
1st	8	420	73.30%	6	153	26.70%	0	267	46.60%	573
2nd	8	1,033	91.01%	6	102	8.99%	0	931	82.02%	1,135
3rd	8	519	39.53%	6	794	60.47%	0	-275	-20.94%	1,313
4th	8	1,082	45.75%	6	1,283	54.25%	0	-201	-8.50%	2,365
5th	8	608	79.58%	6	156	20.42%	0	452	59.16%	764
6th	8	2,275	97.98%	6	47	2.02%	0	2,228	95.96%	2,322
Total	8	5,937	70.08%	6	2,535	29.92%	0	3,402	40.16%	8,472

=== Results by elector ===
1788-89 United States presidential election in Maryland
Party	Candidate	Votes	%
Fusion	John Rogers	7,665	12.51%
Fusion	George Plater (Note: The electoral vote from this elected candidate was never submitted or recorded.)	7,573	12.36%
Federalists	William Tilghman	5,746	9.38%
Federalists	Alexander C. Hanson	5,596	9.14%
Federalists	Philip Thomas	5,456	8.91%
Federalists	Robert Smith	5,455	8.91%
Federalists	William Richardson	5,402	8.82%
Federalists	William Matthews	5,291	8.64%
Anti-Federalists	Jeremiah T. Chase	2,278	3.72%
Anti-Federalists	John Seney	2,209	3.61%
Anti-Federalists	Charles Ridgely	2,199	3.59%
Anti-Federalists	James Shaw	2,130	3.48%
Anti-Federalists	Henry Waggaman	1,669	2.72%
Anti-Federalists	Lawrence O'Neale	1,241	2.03%
Anti-Federalists	Thomas Johnson	718	1.17%
Federalists	John Done	165	0.27%
Anti-Federalists	Moses Rawlings	157	0.26%
Anti-Federalists	William Thomas Jr.	125	0.20%
Anti-Federalists	William Paca	83	0.14%
Federalists	Nathaniel Ramsey	70	0.11%
Anti-Federalists	John A. Thomas	19	0.03%
Federalists	George Dent	1	0.00%
Total votes		61,248	100.00%

== See also ==
- United States presidential elections in Maryland
- 1788–89 United States presidential election
- 1788–89 United States elections
