= 1788–89 United States presidential election in New Hampshire =

- December 15, 1788 (popular vote); January 7, 1789 (legislature)
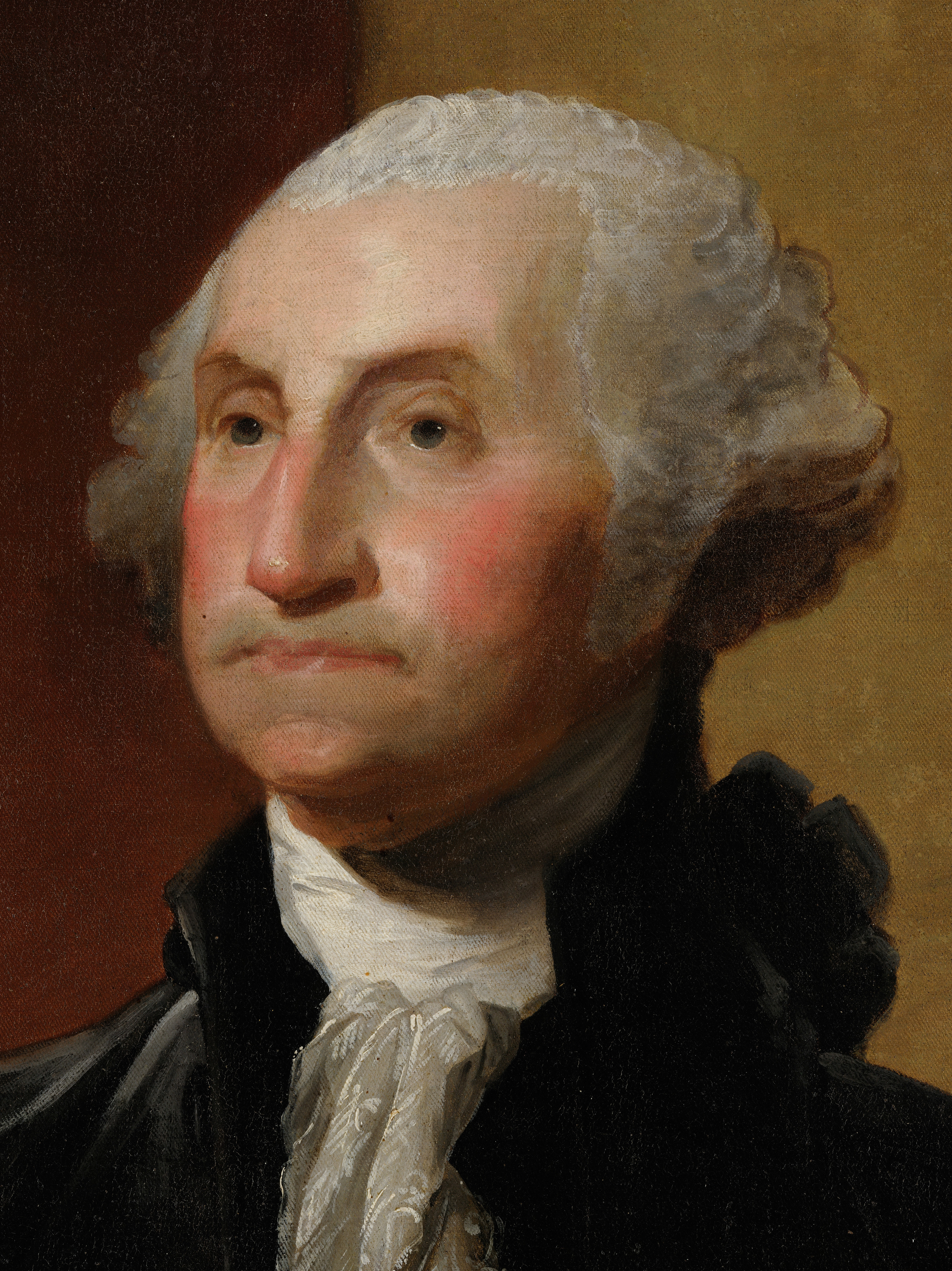

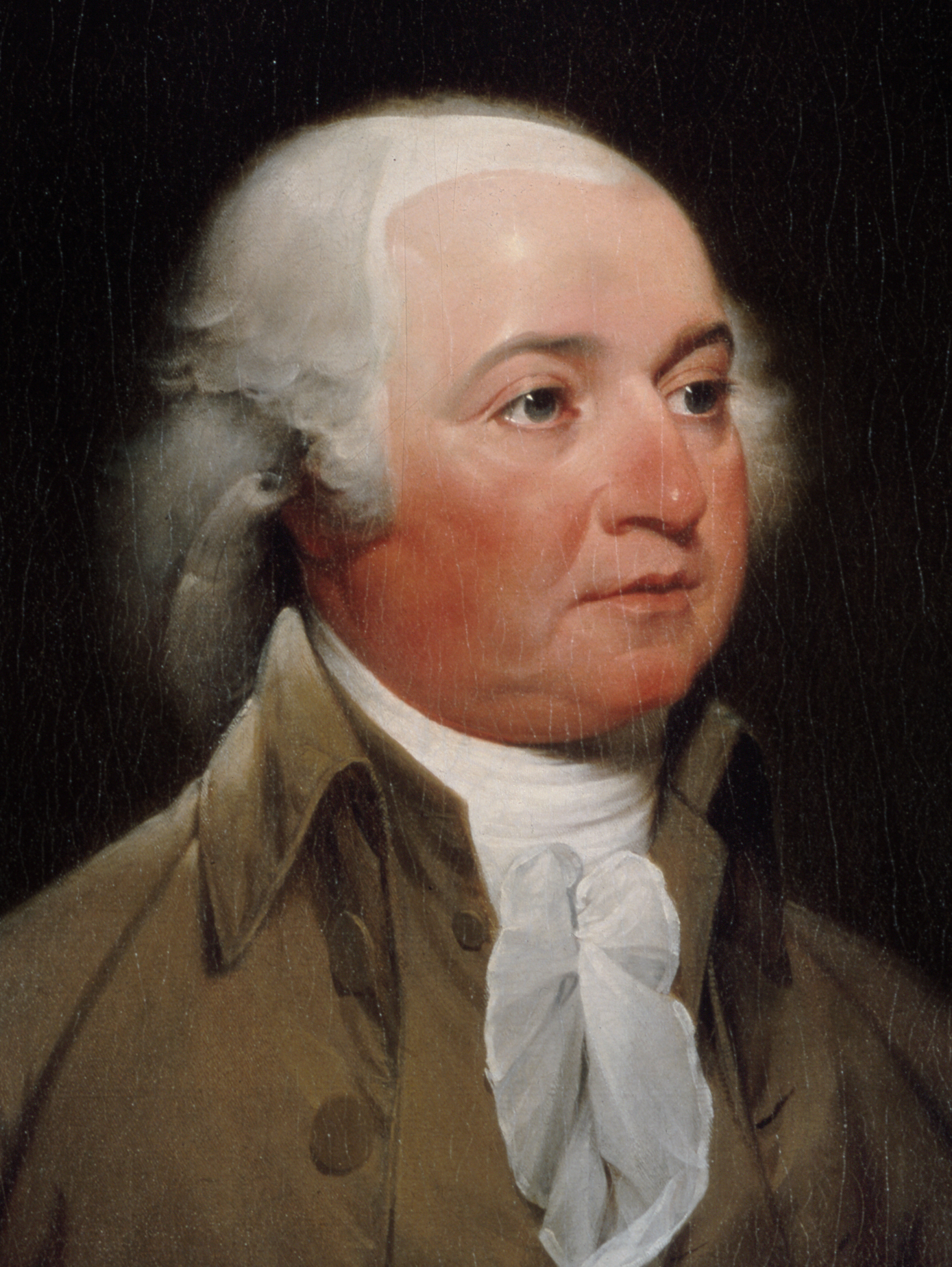
Nominee	George Washington	John Adams
Party	Independent	Federalists
Home state	Virginia	Massachusetts
Electoral vote	5	5
Popular vote	1,922	—
Percentage	100.00%	—
County results
Federalists
60–70%
70–80%
80–90%
90–100%
Anti-Federalists
50–60%
President before election
Office established
Elected President
George Washington
Independent

A presidential election was held in New Hampshire on December 15, 1788, and January 7, 1789, as part of the 1788–89 United States presidential election. Federalists outpolled their competitors in the first round of voting. The New Hampshire General Court subsequently chose five electors from among the 10 leading candidates, who voted for George Washington and John Adams.

Washington was widely expected to be the first choice of the Electoral College in the first elections held under the Constitution of the United States. Some uncertainty persisted concerning the choice of the first vice president, however, due partly to the electoral system established by Article II of the Constitution. Under this system, each elector voted for two candidates; the candidate with the largest majority was elected president, and the runner-up vice president. With Washington likely to become president, many observers expected Adams to receive the other vote of most of the electors. Some, such as Alexander Hamilton, feared Adams's popularity would be so great as to result in a tied vote, throwing the election to the United States House of Representatives. Hamilton believed this event would be deeply embarrassing to the new government and personally intervened with the electors to urge them not to vote for Adams.

The leaders of the state's major Political factions had declared a temporary truce in 1788 in order to jointly support ratifying the Constitution. In the absence of organized parties, the election was in effect a local contest between favorite sons. Several tickets were proposed including the names of prominent citizens, without indicating for whom the candidates would vote if elected. None of the candidates won a majority in the first round, sending the election to the General Court. Following a lengthy standoff with the upper chamber, the House of Representatives dropped its demand to choose the electors on a joint ballot of both houses. Voting proceeded separately in the Senate and the House of Representatives; the five candidates with the most popular votes were appointed by the legislature. The electors met subsequently on February 4 and voted unanimously for Washington and Adams.

== General election ==
=== Summary ===
New Hampshire chose five electors on a statewide general ticket. Early election laws required voters to elect each member of the Electoral College individually, rather than as a block. The following table compares the sum of the votes for the leading Federalist and Anti-Federalist electors to give an approximate sense of the statewide popular vote.

1788–89 United States presidential election in New Hampshire
Party	Candidate	Votes	%
Federalists	George Washington	1,759	91.52
Anti-Federalists	George Washington	163	8.48
Total	George Washington	1,922	100.00
Total votes		1,922	100.00

=== Results by county ===
Complete returns are missing for most townships. This table compares the votes for the leading Federalist and Anti-Federalist electors in each county based on partial returns.

1788–89 United States presidential election in New Hampshire
County	George Washington Federalists		George Washington Anti-Federalists		Margin		Total
County	Votes	%	Votes	%	Votes	%	Total
Cheshire	21	60.00%	14	40.00%	7	20.00%	35
Grafton	96	90.57%	10	9.43%	86	81.14%	106
Hillsborough	95	65.97%	49	34.03%	46	31.94%	144
Rockingham	308	94.48%	18	5.52%	290	88.96%	326
Strafford	68	48.57%	72	51.43%	-4	-2.86%	140
TOTAL	588	78.30%	163	21.70%	425	56.60%	751

=== Electors ===
Complete returns are missing for most townships. The joint committee of the Senate and the House of Representatives reported a total of 20,142 votes between all the candidates. Phil Lampi identifies 80 candidates who received at least one vote in any of the 21 townships with surviving returns, in addition to 9,527 scattering votes. Between five and 10 candidates received votes in the majority of townships surveyed; in no township was the number of candidates greater than 25. The following table shows the statewide totals for the 10 leading candidates as recorded in the published proceedings of the General Court; the votes for the remaining candidates are based on the incomplete township returns.

1788-89 United States presidential election in New Hampshire (Note: Vote totals in italics are based on partial returns from 21 townships.)
Party	Candidate	Votes	%
Federalists	Benjamin Bellows	1,759	8.73%
Federalists	John Pickering	1,364	6.77%
Federalists	Ebenezer Thompson	1,063	5.28%
Federalists	John Sullivan	872	4.33%
Federalists	John Parker	851	4.23%
Unknown	John Dudley	718	3.56%
Federalists	Joshua Wentworth (Note: Federalist candidate for the New Hampshire Senate in 1788.)	667	3.31%
Unknown	Nathaniel Folsom	589	2.92%
Unknown	Ebenezer Smith	543	2.70%
Unknown	Joseph Cilley (Note: Anti-Federalist partisan during Washington's second term.)	528	2.62%
Federalists	Christopher Toppan	164	0.81%
Anti-Federalists	Joseph Badger Jr.	96	0.48%
Unknown	Robert Wallace	94	0.47%
Federalists	Timothy Farrar	75	0.37%
Federalists	John Bell	65	0.32%
Unknown	Woodbury Langdon	60	0.30%
Federalists	Abiel Foster	47	0.23%
Federalists	Pierce Long	47	0.23%
Unknown	Benjamin Fellows	46	0.23%
Unknown	Ebenezer Flanders	46	0.23%
Unknown	Timothy Walker	46	0.23%
Unknown	John MacCleary	45	0.22%
Federalists	Thomas Bartlett	44	0.22%
Federalists	John Calfe	43	0.21%
Unknown	John McDuffee	33	0.16%
Unknown	George Reed	32	0.16%
Unknown	Stark	31	0.15%
Unknown	Charles Johnston	29	0.14%
Unknown	Decan James Hosley	28	0.14%
Federalists	Francis Worster	28	0.14%
Federalists	Samuel Livermore	28	0.14%
Unknown	Bezaleel Woodward	27	0.13%
Unknown	John Woodbury	27	0.13%
Unknown	Phillips White	27	0.13%
Unknown	Jacob Abbott	25	0.12%
Unknown	Moses Dow	25	0.12%
Unknown	Nathaniel Adams	23	0.11%
Anti-Federalists	Nathaniel Peabody (Note: Anti-Federalist candidate for the U.S. House of Representatives in 1788.)	23	0.11%
Anti-Federalists	Charles Barrett	22	0.11%
Unknown	John Dailey	21	0.10%
Unknown	Moses Chase	21	0.10%
Unknown	John S. Sherburne	21	0.10%
Federalists	Jonathan Freeman	19	0.09%
Unknown	Bartlet	19	0.09%
Anti-Federalists	Archebald MacMurphey	16	0.08%
Anti-Federalists	Joshua Atherton	16	0.08%
Unknown	Ebenezer Freeman	13	0.06%
Federalists	Elisha Payne	13	0.06%
Unknown	Peter Green	13	0.06%
Federalists	Benjamin West	12	0.06%
Unknown	John Stark	12	0.06%
Federalists	Amos Shepard	11	0.05%
Unknown	Dame	10	0.05%
Unknown	Daniel Tilton	9	0.04%
Unknown	John Duncan	9	0.04%
Federalists	William Simpson	9	0.04%
Unknown	Scilly	8	0.04%
Unknown	Matthew Thornton	8	0.04%
Unknown	John Stevens	7	0.03%
Unknown	John Bellows	6	0.03%
Unknown	Buckminster	6	0.03%
Unknown	D. Langdon	6	0.03%
Unknown	Samuel McClintock	6	0.03%
Unknown	Merrill	6	0.03%
Unknown	Jonathan Gove	5	0.02%
Unknown	Richard Bartlett	5	0.02%
Unknown	McConnell	5	0.02%
Federalists	Paine Wingate	5	0.02%
Unknown	Runnels	3	0.01%
Unknown	Francis Smith	2	0.01%
Unknown	Robert Means	2	0.01%
Federalists	Simeon Olcott	2	0.01%
Unknown	T. Adams	2	0.01%
Unknown	Ammi Ruhamah Cutter	1	0.00%
Unknown	Daniel Rindge	1	0.00%
Unknown	John Bradley	1	0.00%
Unknown	John Duncan	1	0.00%
Federalists	John Taylor Gilman	1	0.00%
Unknown	Richard M. Hogg	1	0.00%
Unknown	Simeon Alcott	1	0.00%
Federalists	Jeremiah Smith	—	—
Unknown	John Stephens	—	—
Write-in		9,527	47.30%
Total votes		20,142	100.00%

== Electoral College ==
Presidential candidate	Party	Home state	Electoral vote (Note: Each elector voted for two candidates.)
George Washington	Independent	Virginia	5
John Adams	Federalists	Massachusetts	5
Total votes			5

Source: A New Nation Votes: American Election Results, 1787–1825. American Antiquarian Society.

== See also ==
- United States presidential elections in New Hampshire

== Bibliography ==
- Center for the Study of the American Constitution (n.d.). "Alphabetical List of State Convention Delegates" (PDF). University of Wisconsin–Madison.
- Cunliffe, Marcus (2002). "Elections of 1789 and 1792". In Schlesinger, Arthur M. Jr.; Israel, Fred L. (eds.). History of American Presidential Elections, 1789–2001. Vol. 1. Philadelphia: Chelsea House Publishers. pp. 1–56.
- Daniell, Jere R. (1970). Experiment in Republicanism; New Hampshire Politics and the American Revolution, 1741–1794. Cambridge: Harvard University Press.
- Jensen, Merrill; Becker, Robert A., eds. (1976). The Documentary History of the First Federal Elections, 1788–1790. Vol. 1. Madison: University of Wisconsin Press.
- Lampi, Philip J. (n.d.). "Electoral College". A New Nation Votes. American Antiquarian Society.
- Lampi, Philip J. (2012a). "1789 President of the United States, Electoral College". A New Nation Votes. American Antiquarian Society.
- Lampi, Philip J. (2012). "New Hampshire 1788 Electoral College". A New Nation Votes. American Antiquarian Society.
- Scales, John (1921). Life of Gen. Joseph Cilley. Manchester, NH: Standard Book Company.
- Turner, Lynn Warren (1983). The Ninth State: New Hampshire's Formative Years. Chapel Hill: University of North Carolina Press.
