= 1788–89 United States presidential election in Pennsylvania =

- January 7, 1789
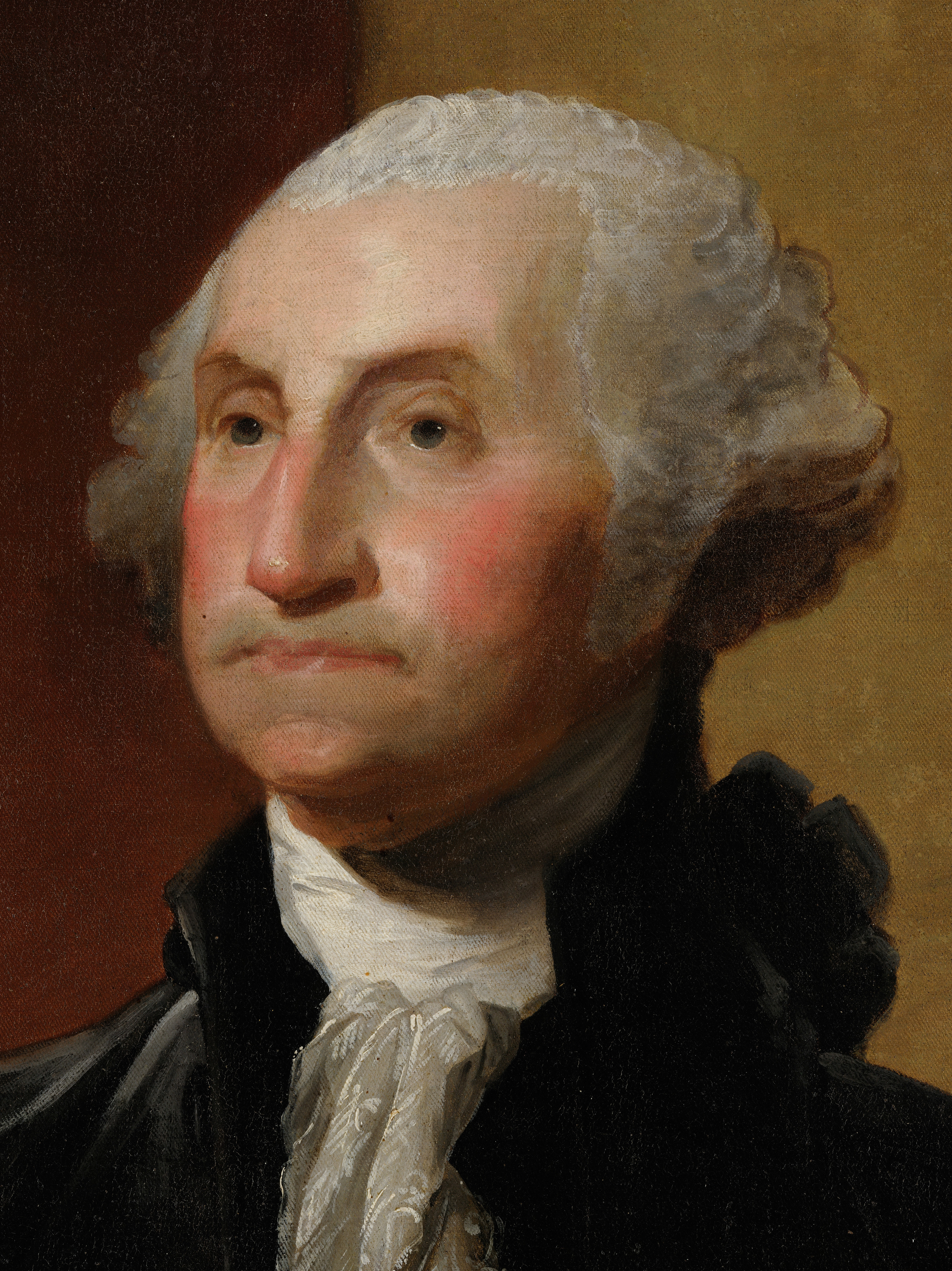

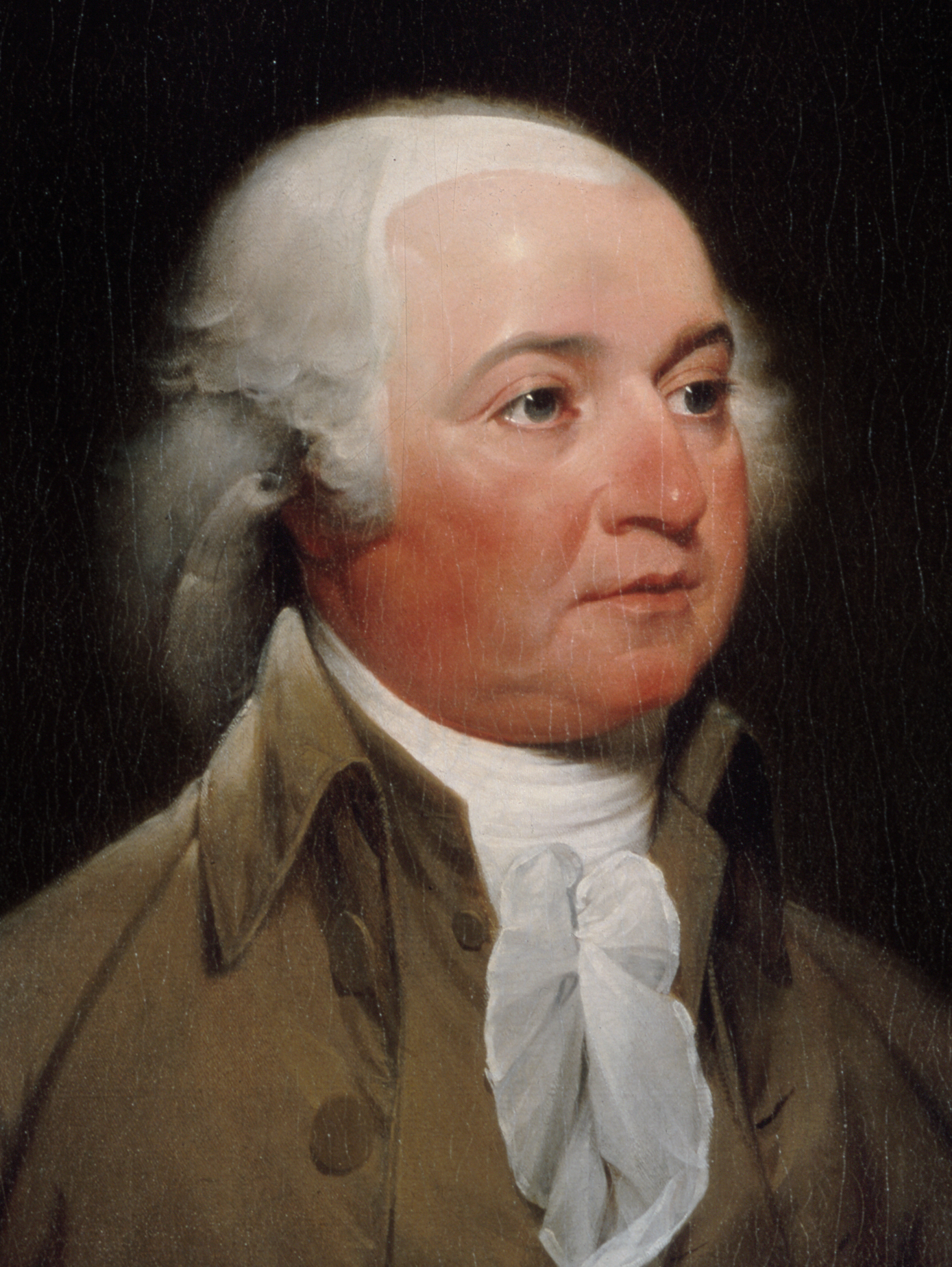

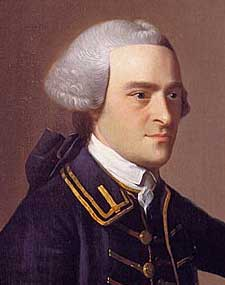
Nominee	George Washington	John Adams	John Hancock
Party	Independent	Federalists	Federalists
Home state	Virginia	Massachusetts	Massachusetts
Electoral vote	10	8	2
Popular vote	6,718	–	–
Percentage	100.00%	–	–
County results
Washington (Federalist electors)
50–60%
60–70%
70–80%
80–90%
90–100%
President before election
Office established
Elected President
George Washington
Independent

A presidential election was held in Pennsylvania on January 7, 1789, as part of the 1788–89 United States presidential election. Voters chose 10 representatives, or electors to the Electoral College, who voted for President and Vice President.

Pennsylvania unanimously voted for nonpartisan candidate and commander-in-chief of the Continental Army, George Washington. The total vote is composed of 6,718 for Federalist electors, known as the Lancaster Ticket, and 912 for Anti-Federalist electors, known as the Harrisburg Ticket, all of whom were supportive of Washington.

== Results by presidential candidates ==
1788-89 United States presidential election in Pennsylvania
Party	Candidate	Votes	%
Independent	George Washington	6,718	100.00%
Total votes		6,718	100.00%

=== Results by county ===
1788–89 United States presidential election in Pennsylvania
County	George Washington Independent		Margin		Total (Note: Results for George Washington are taken from the highest voted elector with either a formal ticket pledge, or a submitted electoral vote, for each county.)
County	#	%	#	%	Total
Bedford	62	100.00%	62	100.00%	62
Berks	159	100.00%	159	100.00%	159
Bucks	443	100.00%	443	100.00%	443
Chester	501	100.00%	501	100.00%	501
Cumberland	160	100.00%	160	100.00%	160
Dauphin	369	100.00%	369	100.00%	369
Fayette	No data		No data		
Franklin	349	100.00%	349	100.00%	349
Huntingdon	90	100.00%	90	100.00%	90
Lancaster	549	100.00%	549	100.00%	549
Luzerne	36	100.00%	36	100.00%	36
Montgomery	343	100.00%	343	100.00%	343
Northampton	324	100.00%	324	100.00%	324
Northumberland	157	100.00%	157	100.00%	157
Philadelphia	647	100.00%	647	100.00%	647
Philadelphia City	1,545	100.00%	1,545	100.00%	1,545
Washington	21	100.00%	21	100.00%	21
Westmoreland	105	100.00%	105	100.00%	105
York	858	100.00%	858	100.00%	858
Total	6,718	100.00%	6,718	100.00%	6,718

=== Results by district ===
1788-89 United States presidential election in Pennsylvania
District	E.V.	George Washington Independent			Margin		Total (Note: Results for George Washington are taken from the highest voted elector with either a formal ticket pledge, or a submitted electoral vote, for each district.)
District	E.V.	#	%	E.V.	#	%	Total
At-large	10	6,718	100.00%	10	6,718	100.00%	6,718
Total	10	6,718	100.00%	10	6,718	100.00%	6,718

== Results by presidential electors ==
1788-89 United States presidential election in Pennsylvania
Party	Candidate	Votes	%
Federalists	Federalists electors	6,718	88.05%
Anti-Federalists	Anti-Federalists electors	912	11.95%
Total votes		7,630	100.00%

=== Results by county ===
1788–89 United States presidential election in Pennsylvania
County	Federalists electors		Anti-Federalists electors		Margin		Total (Note: Results are taken from the highest voted Federalist, and Anti-Federalist elector for each county.)
County	#	%	#	%	#	%	Total
Bedford	62	100.00%	0	0.00%	62	100.00%	62
Berks	159	93.53%	11	6.47%	148	87.06%	170
Bucks	443	100.00%	0	0.00%	443	100.00%	443
Chester	501	57.00%	378	43.00%	123	14.00%	879
Cumberland	160	93.57%	11	6.43%	149	87.14%	171
Dauphin	369	65.08%	198	34.92%	171	30.16%	567
Fayette	No data		No data		No data		
Franklin	349	80.79%	83	19.21%	266	61.58%	432
Huntingdon	90	78.95%	24	21.05%	66	57.90%	114
Lancaster	549	98.39%	9	1.61%	540	96.78%	558
Luzerne	36	100.00%	0	0.00%	36	100.00%	36
Montgomery	343	95.28%	17	4.72%	326	90.56%	360
Northampton	324	80.80%	77	19.20%	247	61.60%	401
Northumberland	157	100.00%	0	0.00%	157	100.00%	157
Philadelphia	647	99.54%	3	0.46%	644	99.08%	650
Philadelphia City	1,545	98.98%	16	1.02%	1,529	97.96%	1,561
Washington	21	100.00%	0	0.00%	21	100.00%	21
Westmoreland	105	55.56%	84	44.44%	21	11.12%	189
York	858	99.88%	1	0.12%	857	99.76%	859
Total	6,718	88.05%	912	11.95%	5,806	76.10%	7,630

=== Results by district ===
1788-89 United States presidential election in Pennsylvania
District	E.V.	Federalists electors			Anti-Federalists electors			Margin		Total (Note: Results are taken from the highest voted Federalist, and Anti-Federalist elector for each district.)
District	E.V.	#	%	E.V.	#	%	E.V.	#	%	Total
At-large	10	6,718	88.05%	10	912	11.95%	0	5,806	76.10%	7,630
Total	10	6,718	88.05%	10	912	11.95%	0	5,806	76.10%	7,630

=== Results by elector ===
1788-89 United States presidential election in Pennsylvania
Party	Candidate	Votes	%
Federalists	Edward Hand (Note: Federalists elector for this election.)	6,711	9.93%
Federalists	Collinson Read	6,329	9.36%
Federalists	Laurence Keene	6,315	9.34%
Federalists	George Gibson	6,312	9.34%
Federalists	John Arndt	6,307	9.33%
Federalists	James Wilson	6,297	9.31%
Federalists	James O'Hara	6,279	9.29%
Federalists	David Grier	6,250	9.24%
Federalists	Samuel Potts	6,225	9.21%
Federalists	Alexander Graydon	5,954	8.81%
Anti-Federalists	William Gibbons (Note: Anti-Federalists elector for this election.)	672	0.99%
Anti-Federalists	Thomas Craig	487	0.72%
Anti-Federalists	David Rittenhouse	424	0.63%
Anti-Federalists	James Potter	421	0.62%
Anti-Federalists	John Smilie	416	0.62%
Anti-Federalists	James McLene	413	0.61%
Anti-Federalists	Joseph Hiester	402	0.59%
Anti-Federalists	Walter Stewart	381	0.56%
Anti-Federalists	Philip Wager	370	0.55%
Unknown	John Woods	110	0.16%
Unknown	James Gibbons	58	0.09%
Unknown	George Bryan	45	0.07%
Federalists	John Hannum III (Note: Voted yes to adopt the new federal constitution of the United States.)	42	0.06%
Unknown	William Stewart	36	0.05%
Anti-Federalists	James Edgar (Note: Voted no to adopt the new federal constitution of the United States.)	35	0.05%
Unknown	Joseph Montgomery	27	0.04%
Anti-Federalists	Robert Whitehill	22	0.03%
Unknown	James Irwin	15	0.02%
Federalists	Jared Ingersoll (Note: Federalist elector for this election.)	15	0.02%
Unknown	Daniel Hiester	14	0.02%
Unknown	Samuel Postlewait	13	0.02%
Unknown	James Arndts	12	0.02%
Unknown	Joseph Potts	12	0.02%
Unknown	Moses MacLean	12	0.02%
Unknown	Robert Clark	12	0.02%
Unknown	Robert Lollar	12	0.02%
Unknown	Isaac	11	0.02%
Anti-Federalists	Nicholas Lutz	11	0.02%
Anti-Federalists	William Findley	10	0.01%
Unknown	Thomas Mifflin	9	0.01%
Unknown	William Gibson	8	0.01%
Unknown	John O'Hara	7	0.01%
Unknown	George Grier	6	0.01%
Unknown	Alexander MacGee	5	0.01%
Unknown	William Irvine	5	0.01%
Unknown	John Potts	4	0.01%
Unknown	Levi Hollingsworth	4	0.01%
Unknown	Adam Hubley	3	0.00%
Unknown	Frederick Rora	3	0.00%
Federalists	John Allison	3	0.00%
Unknown	Joseph Cook	3	0.00%
Unknown	Robert Hunter	3	0.00%
Unknown	Alexander Grier	2	0.00%
Federalists	George Clymer	2	0.00%
Unknown	John Irwin	2	0.00%
Unknown	John Parker	2	0.00%
Unknown	John Steinmetz	2	0.00%
Unknown	Matthew Scott	2	0.00%
Federalists	Thomas McKean	2	0.00%
Unknown	William Stuart	2	0.00%
Anti-Federalists	William Todd	2	0.00%
Unknown	Alexander Potts	1	0.00%
Unknown	Andrew Porter	1	0.00%
Unknown	Benjamin Pennington	1	0.00%
Unknown	Charles Pettit	1	0.00%
Unknown	Christian Steer	1	0.00%
Unknown	Edward Roberts	1	0.00%
Unknown	Francis Mentges	1	0.00%
Unknown	George Clingan	1	0.00%
Unknown	George Habacker	1	0.00%
Unknown	George Palmer	1	0.00%
Unknown	George Potts	1	0.00%
Unknown	Henry Kammerer	1	0.00%
Unknown	Jacob Hiltzheimer	1	0.00%
Unknown	James Barr	1	0.00%
Unknown	James Heister	1	0.00%
Unknown	James MacLauren	1	0.00%
Unknown	James Potts	1	0.00%
Unknown	James Riddle	1	0.00%
Anti-Federalists	John Baird	1	0.00%
Unknown	John Barr	1	0.00%
Unknown	John Bradshaw	1	0.00%
Federalists	John Boyd	1	0.00%
Unknown	John Van Compton	1	0.00%
Unknown	John Cope	1	0.00%
Unknown	John Craig	1	0.00%
Unknown	John Hiester	1	0.00%
Unknown	John Karr	1	0.00%
Unknown	John Mackey	1	0.00%
Unknown	John Nixon	1	0.00%
Unknown	John Ralston	1	0.00%
Unknown	John Stewart	1	0.00%
Unknown	John Young	1	0.00%
Unknown	Joseph Sharp	1	0.00%
Unknown	Lewis Farmer	1	0.00%
Unknown	Robert Hunt	1	0.00%
Unknown	William Dean	1	0.00%
Unknown	William Heysham	1	0.00%
Unknown	William Hunter	1	0.00%
Unknown	William MacGee	1	0.00%
Total votes		67,609	100.00%

== See also ==
- United States presidential elections in Pennsylvania
