= 1788–89 United States presidential election in Connecticut =

- January 7, 1789
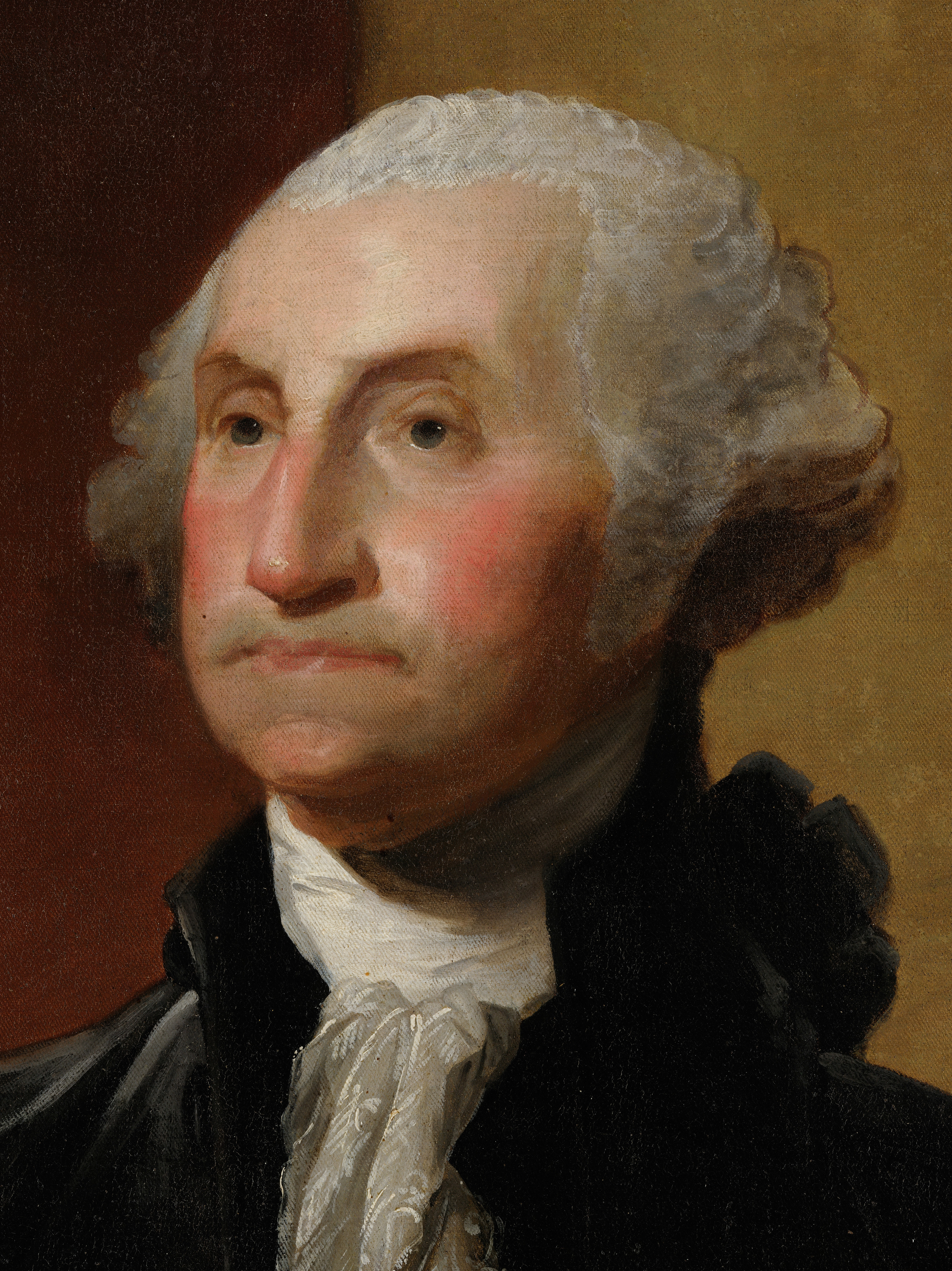

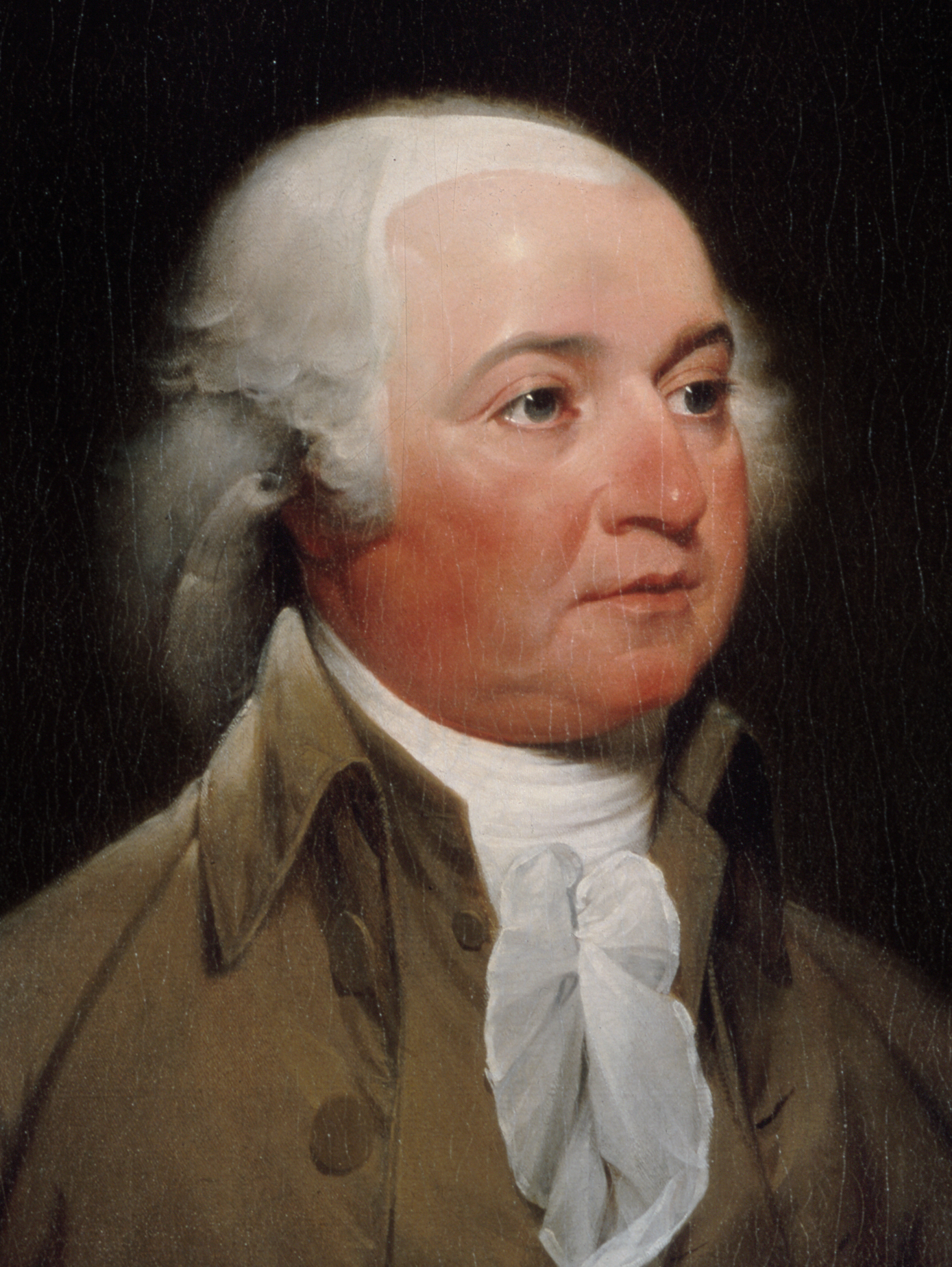

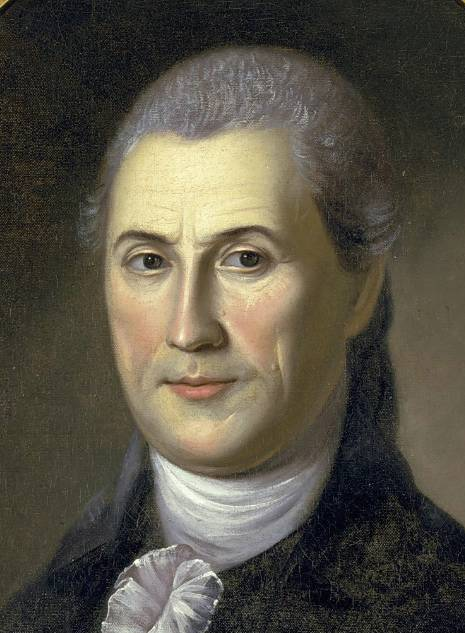
Nominee	George Washington	John Adams	Samuel Huntington
Party	Independent	Federalists	Federalists
Home state	Virginia	Massachusetts	Connecticut
Electoral vote	7	5	2
President before election
Office established
Elected President
George Washington
Independent

A presidential election was held in Connecticut on January 7, 1789, as part of the 1788–89 United States presidential election. The Connecticut General Assembly chose seven electors, all Federalists, who voted for George Washington.

Washington was widely expected to be the first choice of the Electoral College in the first elections held under the Constitution of the United States. Some uncertainty persisted concerning the choice of the first vice president, however, due partly to the electoral system established by Article II of the Constitution. Under this system, each elector voted for two candidates; the candidate with the largest majority was elected president, and the runner-up vice president. With Washington likely to become president, many observers expected John Adams, the U.S. ambassador to the United Kingdom, to receive the other vote of most of the electors. Some, such as Alexander Hamilton, feared Adams's popularity would be so great as to result in a tied vote, throwing the election to the United States House of Representatives. Hamilton believed this event would be deeply embarrassing to the new government. Through his associate, Samuel Blachley Webb, Hamilton personally intervened with the electors to urge them not to vote for Adams. Hamilton's appeal persuaded two unknown electors to withhold their votes from Adams, who received five votes from Connecticut to Washington's seven.

== General election ==
=== Electors ===
The Council and the House of Representatives met separately on January 7 to conduct the election. The House nominated seven electors, of whom five were accepted without debate. The Council attempted to replace Thaddeus Burr and Jedediah Huntington with Abraham Davenport and George Wyllys on the list of electors, but withdrew its objection when the House refused to agree to the substitution.

Nominated by the House	Nominated by the Council	Appointed by the General Assembly
Samuel Huntington; Oliver Wolcott Sr.; Richard Law; Matthew Griswold; Erastus Wolcott; Thaddeus Burr; Jedediah Huntington	Samuel Huntington; Oliver Wolcott Sr.; Richard Law; Matthew Griswold; Erastus Wolcott; ~~Thaddeus Burr~~; ~~Jedediah Huntington~~; Abraham Davenport; George Wyllys	Samuel Huntington; Oliver Wolcott Sr.; Richard Law; Matthew Griswold; Erastus Wolcott; Thaddeus Burr; Jedediah Huntington

=== Electoral College ===
When the electors met in Hartford, Connecticut, on February 4, all seven electors voted for Washington. Five of the seven also voted for Adams, but at Hamilton's urging, two electors instead voted for the governor of Connecticut, Samuel Huntington.

Presidential candidate	Party	Home state	Electoral vote (Note: Each elector voted for two candidates.)
George Washington	Independent	Virginia	7
John Adams	Federalists	Massachusetts	5
Samuel Huntington	Federalists	Connecticut	2
Total votes			7

Source: A New Nation Votes: American Election Results, 1787–1825. American Antiquarian Society.

== See also ==
- United States presidential elections in Connecticut

== Bibliography ==
- Cunliffe, Marcus (2002). "Elections of 1789 and 1792". In Schlesinger, Arthur M. Jr.; Israel, Fred L. (eds.). History of American Presidential Elections, 1789–2001. Vol. 1. Philadelphia: Chelsea House Publishers. pp. 1–56.
- DenBoer, Gordon; Brown, Lucy Trumbull; Hagermann, Charles D., eds. (1986). The Documentary History of the First Federal Elections, 1788–1790. Vol. 2. Madison: University of Wisconsin Press.
- Lampi, Philip J. (2012). "1789 President of the United States, Electoral College". A New Nation Votes. American Antiquarian Society.
