= 1788–89 United States presidential election in Delaware =

- January 7, 1789
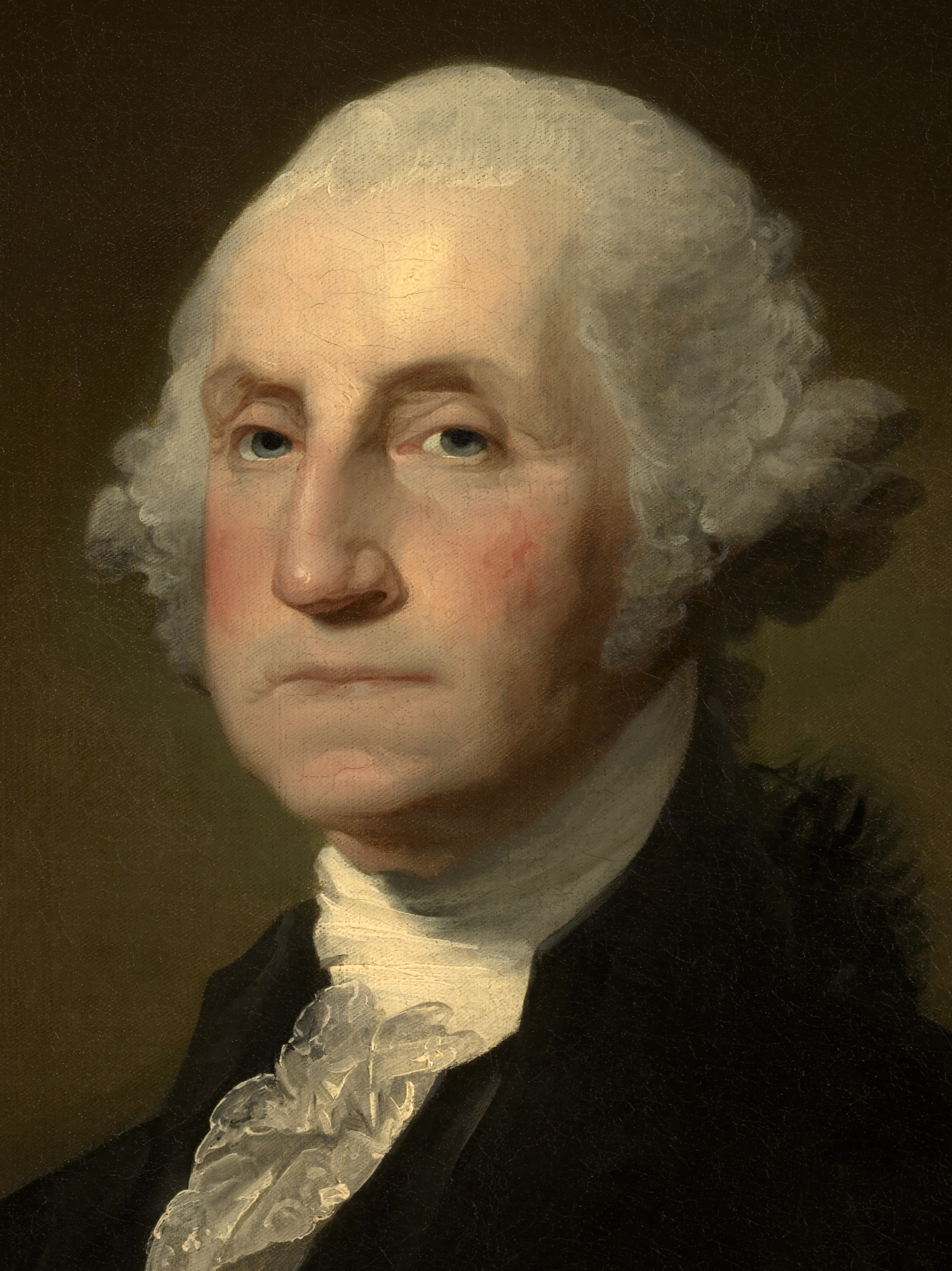

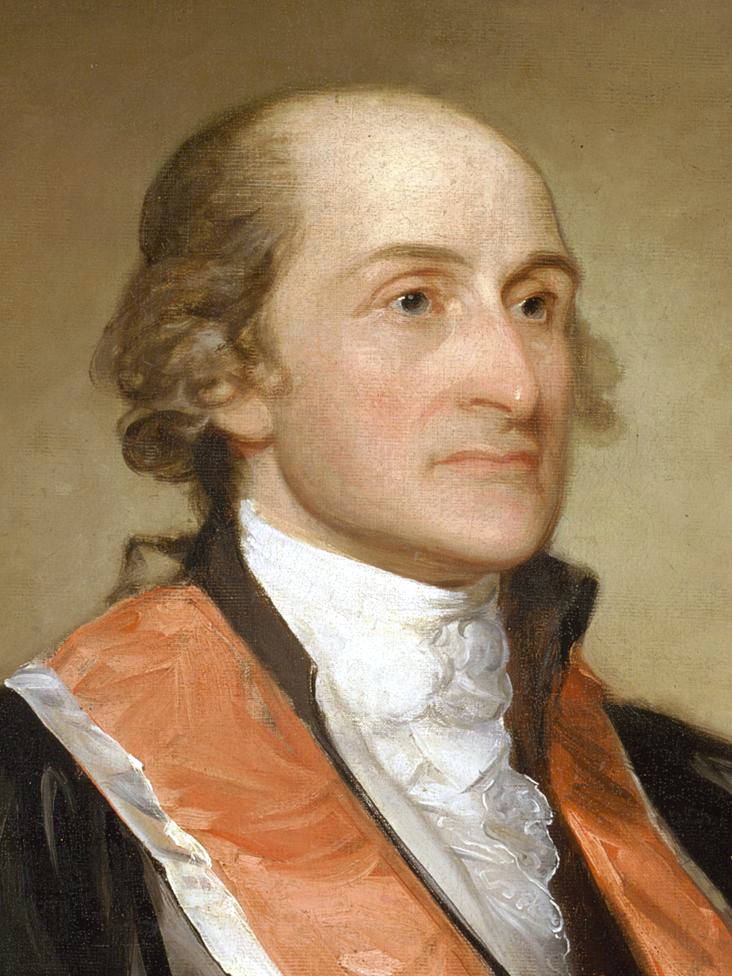
Nominee	George Washington	John Jay
Party	Independent	Federalists
Home state	Virginia	New York
Electoral vote	3	3
Popular vote	685	—
Percentage	100.00%	—
County results
Federalists
100%
President before election
Office established
Elected President
George Washington
Independent

A presidential election was held in Delaware on January 7, 1789, as part of the 1788–89 United States presidential election. The Federalists carried the state's three counties unanimously, choosing three electors who voted for George Washington.

Washington was widely expected to be the first choice of the Electoral College in the first elections held under the Constitution of the United States. Some uncertainty persisted concerning the choice of the first vice president, however, due partly to the electoral system established by Article II of the Constitution. Under this system, each elector voted for two candidates; the candidate with the largest majority was elected president, and the runner-up vice president. With Washington likely to become president, many observers expected John Adams, the U.S. ambassador to the United Kingdom, to receive the other vote of most of the electors. Some, such as Alexander Hamilton, feared Adams's popularity would be so great as to result in a tied vote, throwing the election to the United States House of Representatives. Hamilton believed this event would be deeply embarrassing to the new government and personally intervened with the electors to urge them not to vote for Adams.

Voters in each county voted for one elector, with the three candidates with the most votes statewide being elected. John Banning, George Mitchell, and Gunning Bedford Sr. were each unanimously elected. All three subsequently voted for Washington and John Jay at the meeting of the Electoral College on February 4.

== General election ==
=== Summary ===
Delaware chose three electors statewide, based on the cumulative vote in the state's three counties. Early election laws required voters to elect the members of the Electoral College individually, rather than as a block. The following table calculates the sum of all votes for electors in each county to give an approximate sense of the statewide popular vote.

1788–89 United States presidential election in Delaware (Note: Based on returns from New Castle and Sussex counties. The returns from Kent County are missing.)
Party	Candidate	Votes	%
Federalists	George Washington	685	100.00
Total	George Washington	685	100.00
Total votes		685	100.00

=== Results by county ===
1788–89 United States presidential election in Delaware by county
County	George Washington Federalists		Margin		Total
County	Votes	%	Votes	%	Total
Kent	**		**	100.00	**
New Castle	163	100.00	163	100.00	163
Sussex	522	100.00	522	100.00%	522
TOTAL	685	100.00	685	100.00	685

=== Electors ===
1788-89 United States presidential election in Delaware
Party	Candidate	Votes	%
Federalists	George Mitchell	522	76.20
Federalists	Gunning Bedford Sr.	163	23.80
Federalists	John Banning	0	0.00
Total votes		685	100.00

== Electoral College ==
Presidential candidate	Party	Home state	Electoral vote (Note: Each elector voted for two candidates.)
George Washington	Independent	Virginia	3
John Jay	Federalists	New York	3
Total votes			3

Source: A New Nation Votes: American Election Results, 1787–1825. American Antiquarian Society.

== See also ==
- United States presidential elections in Delaware

== Bibliography ==
- Cunliffe, Marcus (2002). "Elections of 1789 and 1792". In Schlesinger, Arthur M. Jr.; Israel, Fred L. (eds.). History of American Presidential Elections, 1789–2001. Vol. 1. Philadelphia: Chelsea House Publishers. pp. 1–56.
- DenBoer, Gordon; Brown, Lucy Trumbull; Hagermann, Charles D., eds. (1986). The Documentary History of the First Federal Elections, 1788–1790. Vol. 2. Madison: University of Wisconsin Press.
- Lampi, Philip J. (n.d.). "Electoral College". A New Nation Votes. American Antiquarian Society.
- Lampi, Philip J. (2012a). "Delaware 1789 Electoral College". A New Nation Votes. American Antiquarian Society.
- Lampi, Philip J. (2012b). "1789 President of the United States, Electoral College". A New Nation Votes. American Antiquarian Society.
