= 1788–89 United States presidential election in New Jersey =

- January 7, 1789
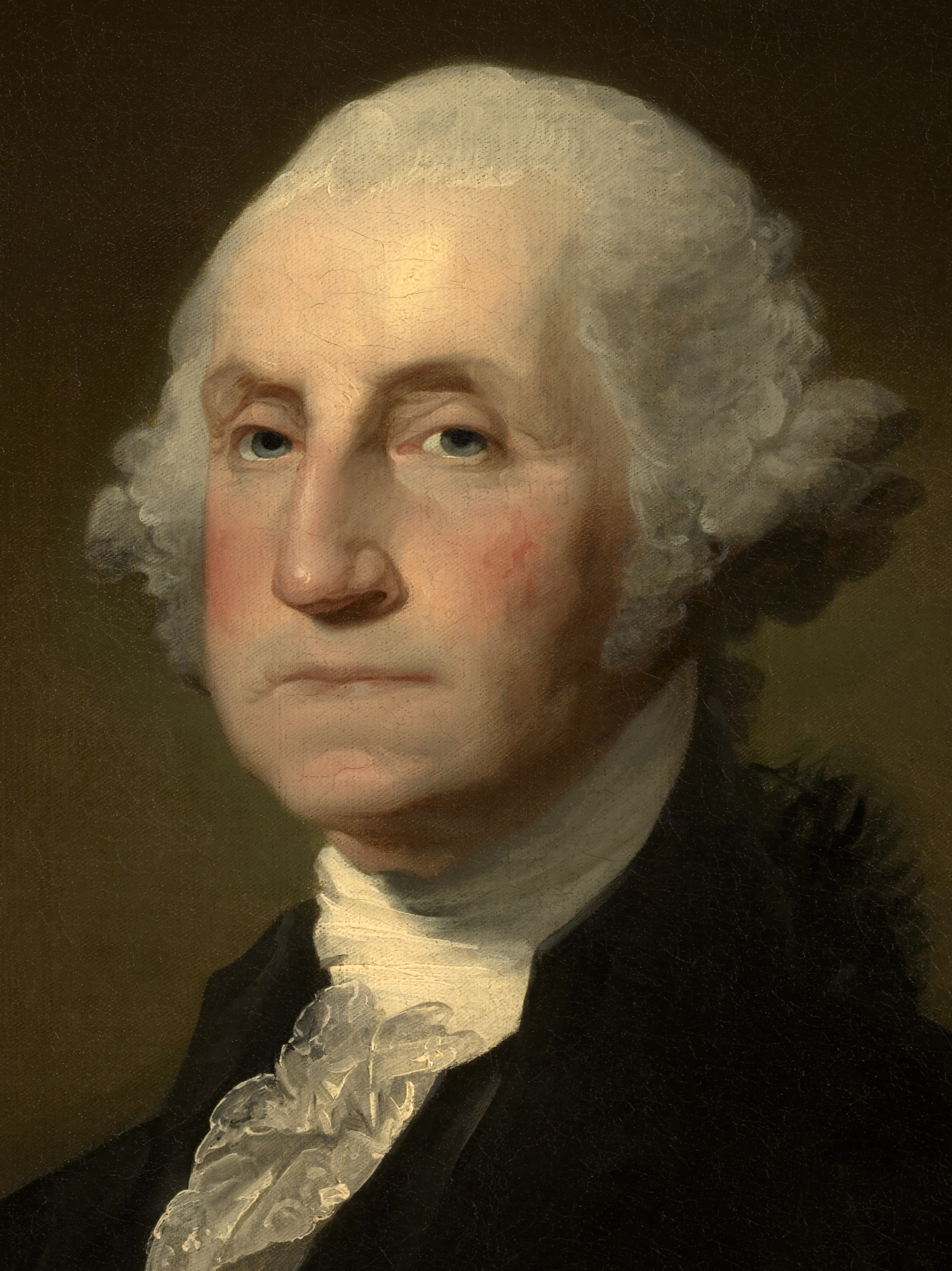

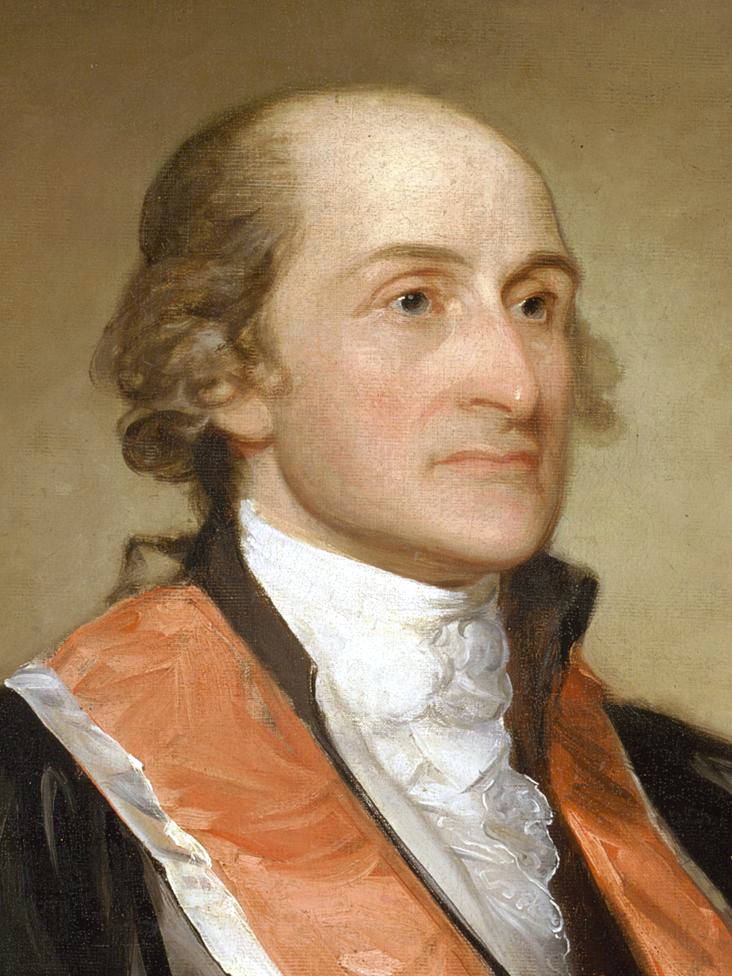

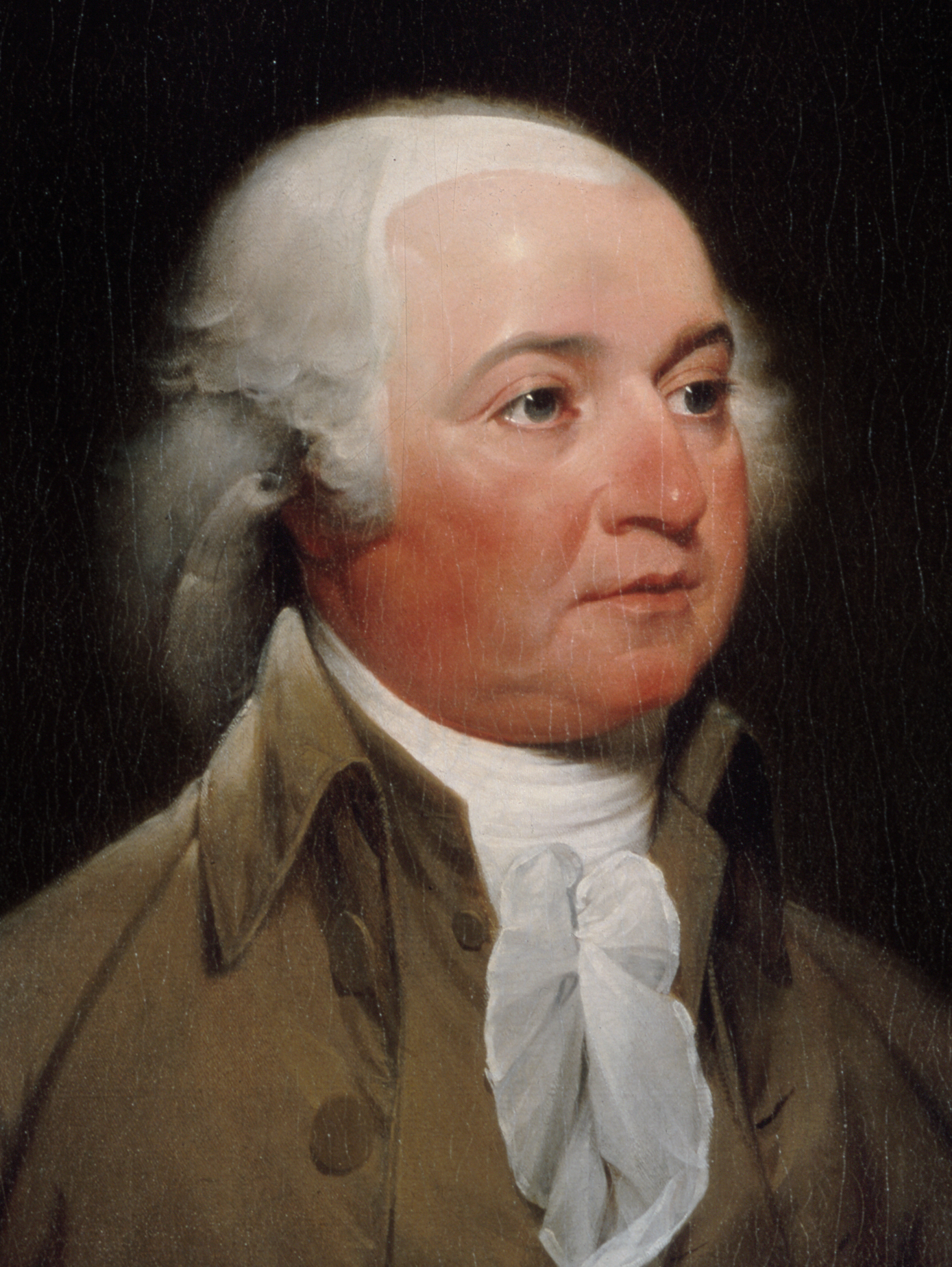
Nominee	George Washington	John Jay	John Adams
Party	Independent	Federalists	Federalists
Home state	Virginia	New York	Massachusetts
Electoral vote	6	5	1
Percentage	100.00%	–	–
President before election
Office established
Elected President
George Washington
Independent

A presidential election was held in New Jersey on January 7, 1789, as part of the 1789 United States presidential election. The state legislature chose six representatives, or electors to the Electoral College, who voted for President and Vice President.

New Jersey, which had become the 3rd state on December 18, 1787, unanimously cast its 6 electoral votes for George Washington during its first presidential election. New Jersey was also the only state in the Union at the time where land-owning women were allowed to vote without the Nineteenth Amendment being in place.

== Results ==
1788-89 United States presidential election in New Jersey
Party	Candidate	Presidential electoral vote	%
Independent	George Washington	6	100.00%
Total votes		6	100.00%

=== Results by elector ===
1788-89 United States presidential election in New Jersey
Party	Candidate	Vice presidential electoral vote (Note: It is not known which elector voted for John Adams.)
Federalists	David Brearley	John Jay/John Adams
Federalists	David Moore	John Jay/John Adams
Federalists	James Kinsey	John Jay/John Adams
Federalists	John Neilson	John Jay/John Adams
Federalists	John Rutherfurd	John Jay/John Adams
Federalists	Matthias Ogden	John Jay/John Adams

== See also ==
- United States presidential elections in New Jersey
