= James Armstrong (Georgia politician) =

American politician (1728–1800)

State Assembly of Georgia

Personal details
- Born: 1728
- Died: 1800 (aged 71–72)
- Party: Federalist

James Armstrong (1728–1800) was a state representative in the Georgia House of Representatives from 1787–1790. During the United States presidential election of 1788–89 he received one electoral vote. He died in 1800.

== History ==
James Armstrong was born in 1728. Much of his early life is unknown.

Armstrong settled in Camden County, Georgia, as one of the first settlers of Colerain. Armstrong accumulated 66,000 acres of land by claiming land bounties offered to war veterans by Georgia. He represented Camden County in the Georgia General Assembly in 1787 and 1790, and served on the Executive Council from 1788–1790. He was a member of the Federalist Party. He died in 1800.

=== Election of 1788–1789 ===
James Armstrong was given one electoral vote in the United States presidential election of 1788–1789 by George Walton, one of the five Georgian electors who were selected by the Georgia General Assembly on January 7, 1789. The election resulted in a win for George Washington, who received 69 electoral votes. Other candidates included: John Adams with 34 electoral votes, John Jay with nine electoral votes, Robert H. Harrison with six electoral votes, John Rutledge with six electoral votes, John Hancock with four electoral votes, George Clinton with three electoral votes, Samuel Huntington with two electoral votes, John Milton with two electoral votes, Benjamin Lincoln with one electoral vote, and Edward Telfair with one electoral vote.
