= William Todd (soldier) =

American military figure and politician

William Todd (c. 1739 – October 10, 1810) was an American soldier and politician from Pennsylvania.

== Early life ==
Todd was born about 1739 probably in Hunterdon County New Jersey to Irish Immigrants Robert Todd and his second wife Elizabeth. His ancestors were alleged to be Scottish rebels and Jacobites, Cavaliers in the Scottish Civil War who had raised the standard of rebellion too often and been exiled to Ireland from their native Angus, Scotland though documentary evidence of this has not been found. His parents were reported by a grandson to have emigrated from Ireland to America in 1737. Robert Todd was in Bethlehem Township, Hunterdon County New Jersey by 1743 until 1755 before coming to Chester County later in 1755 and then by 1760 to the portion of neighboring Philadelphia County that later became Montgomery County.

He married Ann Rambo in 1766 in Philadelphia County. In 1779, he and his wife and children and his brother Samuel Todd followed his two cousins, William and John Todd, and an uncle Andrew Todd to Bedford County, Pennsylvania. He and Samuel soon moved to Westmoreland County where he had speculated in land as early as 1773.

== French and Indian War ==
In the French and Indian War, Todd served with the Pennsylvania troops. He fought at the Battle of Kittaning and was involved in the capture of Fort Duquesne, earning the honor of joining the Rangers.

== Revolutionary War ==
Todd was a good friend of Benjamin Franklin and was a player in the brewing situation that would explode into the American Revolutionary War.

He traveled around Pennsylvania and the New England colonies and was active in Boston. He joined the militia and then the Continentals, and served at the war's early battles, including Bunker Hill, before returning to Pennsylvania, where he was a member of the convention which established Pennsylvania as a Commonwealth and State. He became a Judge from his district at the first elections.

He fought bravely for Independence and re-enlisted, this time being more active in the South, serving until 1781 when Lord Cornwallis surrendered at Yorktown.

The above assertions include a mixture of fact and conflation with other Todds. There is no documentary evidence of a connection with Benjamin Franklin, nor evidence that he was in Boston or that he served at the siege of Yorktown. He did serve as "second judge" on the Westmoreland County Court of Common Pleas, Quarter Sessions, and Orphan's Court in 1791.

== Later years ==
After the Revolutionary War, Todd was chosen as a member of Pennsylvania's ratifying convention and voted against ratification of the United States Constitution. He held several further political positions in his State, and received a pension for his service in the Revolution, so was well taken care of in his old age.

His children were David, Mary md Joseph Baldridge, Nancy md Joseph Clark, Rebecca md James Sloan, Lois md George Armstrong, dau md George Smith, dau md James Matthews. He died in the town of Unity in Westmoreland County, Pennsylvania on October 10, 1810.

His grand niece Mary Todd would later become Abraham Lincoln's wife.
