= Phillips White =

American politician

Phillips White (October 28, 1729– June 24, 1811) was an American farmer from South Hampton, New Hampshire. He was a delegate for New Hampshire to the Continental Congress in 1782 and 1783.

Phillips was born in 1729 at Haverhill, Massachusetts. As a young man he settled in New Hampshire, and made his home in South Hampton for most of his life. During much of the Revolution he was active politically. He represented Rockingham County on the state's Committee of Safety a number of times between 1776 and 1783. In September 1782, White was appointed as a delegate to the Continental Congress. He attended meetings from November of that year (when the new session started) until May 1783.

White died at home and is buried in the Old Cemetery of South Hampton.
