= 1788–89 United States presidential election =

Election of George Washington

- December 15, 1788 – January 7, 1789

69 members of the Electoral College 35 electoral (Note: 73 total electors were appointed, four of which did not vote (2 in Maryland and 2 in Virginia). According to the unamended constitution, a majority of the total number of appointed electors was required for election to the Presidency.) votes needed to win
- Turnout: 11.6%
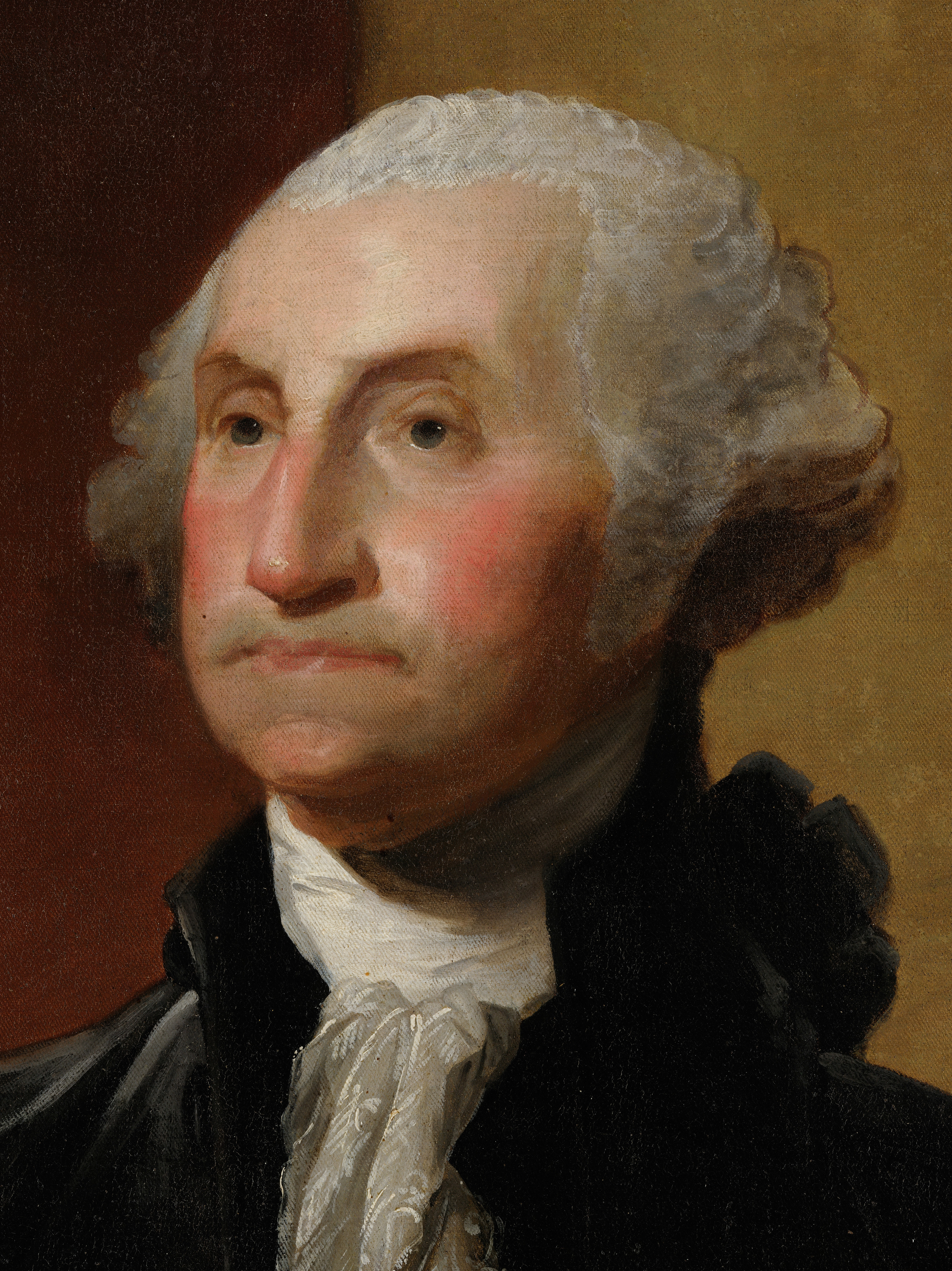
Nominee	George Washington
Party	Independent
Alliance	Federalists; Anti-Federalists
Home state	Virginia
Electoral vote	69
States carried	10
Popular vote	33,460
Percentage	100.0%
- Presidential election results map. Tan denotes states won by Washington, and black denotes states that did not appoint electors. Numbers indicate the number of electoral votes cast by each state. (Note: New York had ratified the Constitution but its legislature failed to appoint presidential electors on time, while North Carolina and Rhode Island had not yet ratified. Vermont governed itself as an unrecognized republic.)
President before election
Office established
Elected President
George Washington
Independent

A presidential election was held in the United States from December 15, 1788 to January 7, 1789, under the new Constitution ratified in 1788. George Washington was unanimously elected for the first of his two terms as president and John Adams became the first vice president. This was the only U.S. presidential election that spanned two calendar years without a contingent election and the first national presidential election in American history.

Under the Articles of Confederation, which were ratified in 1781, the United States had no head of state. The executive function of government remained with the legislative similar to countries that use a parliamentary system. Federal power, strictly limited, was reserved to the Congress of the Confederation whose "President of the United States in Congress Assembled" was also chair of the Committee of the States which aimed to fulfill a function similar to that of the modern Cabinet.

The Constitution created the offices of President and Vice President, fully separating these offices from Congress. The Constitution established an Electoral College, based on each state's congressional representation, in which each elector would cast two votes for two candidates, a procedure modified in 1804 by the ratification of the Twelfth Amendment. States had varying methods for choosing presidential electors. In five states, the state legislature chose electors. The other six chose electors through some form involving a popular vote, though in only two states did the choice depend directly on a statewide vote.

Washington was distinguished as the former Commander of the Continental Army during the American Revolutionary War. After he agreed to come out of retirement, he was elected unanimously; Washington did not select a running mate as that concept was not yet developed.

No formal political parties existed, though an informally organized consistent difference of opinion had already manifested between Federalists and Anti-Federalists. Thus, the contest for the vice-presidency was open. Thomas Jefferson predicted that a popular Northern leader such as Governor John Hancock of Massachusetts or John Adams, a former minister to Great Britain who had represented Massachusetts in Congress, would be elected vice president. Anti-Federalists leaders such as Patrick Henry, who did not run, and George Clinton, who had opposed ratification of the Constitution, also represented potential choices.

All 69 electors present cast one vote for Washington, making his election unanimous. Adams won 34 electoral votes and the vice presidency. The remaining 35 electoral votes were split among 10 candidates, including John Jay, who finished third with nine electoral votes. Three states were ineligible to participate in the election: New York's legislature did not choose electors on time, and North Carolina and Rhode Island had not yet ratified the constitution. Washington was inaugurated in New York City on April 30, 1789, 57 days after the First Congress convened.

== Candidates ==
Though no organized political parties yet existed, political opinion loosely divided between those who had more stridently and enthusiastically endorsed ratification of the Constitution, called Federalists, and Anti-Federalists who had only more reluctantly, skeptically, or conditionally supported, or who had outright opposed ratification. Both factions supported Washington for president. Limited, primitive political campaigning occurred in states and localities where swaying public opinion might have mattered. For example, in Maryland, a state with a statewide popular vote, unofficial parties campaigned locally, advertising.

=== Federalist candidates ===
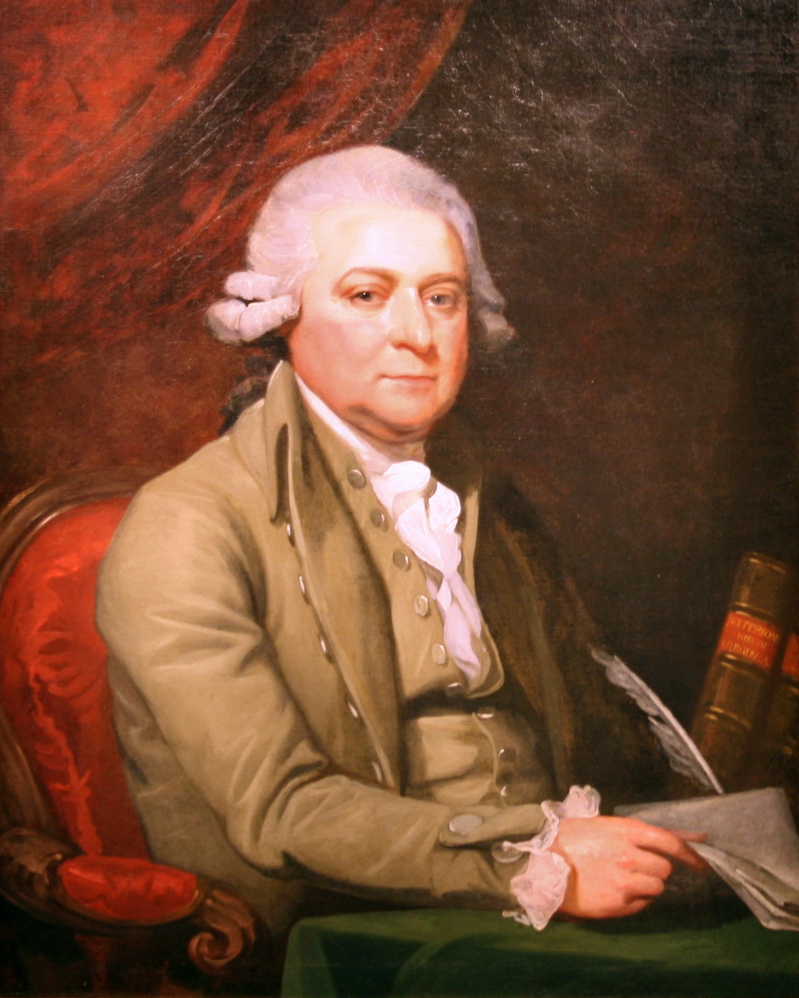
Former Minister to the Netherlands
John Adams
from Massachusetts

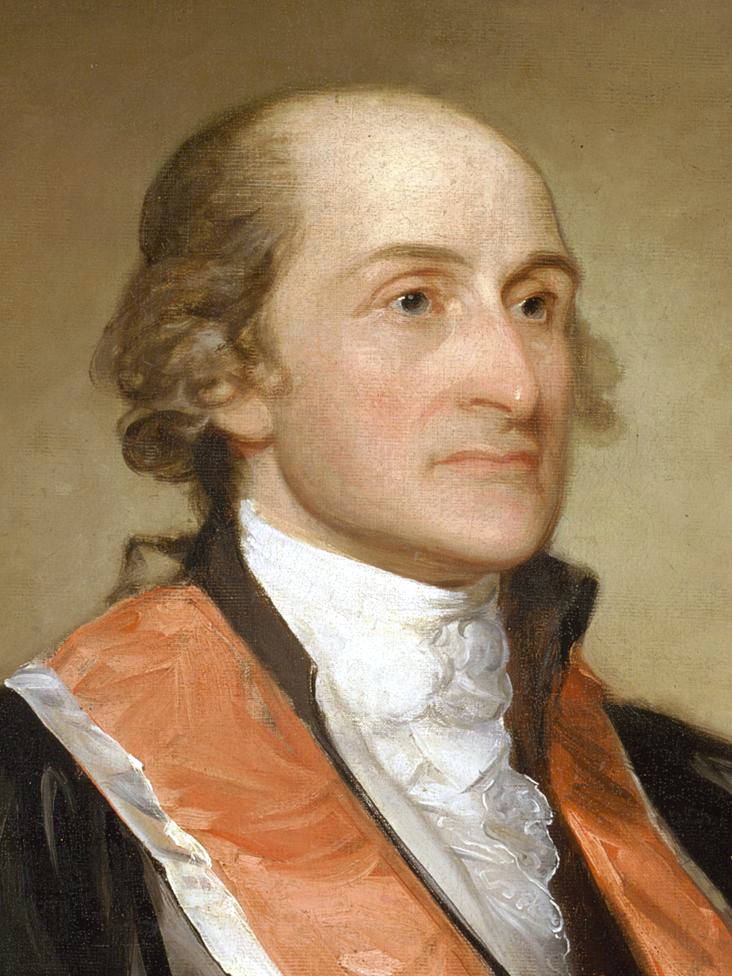
Secretary of Foreign Affairs
John Jay
from New York

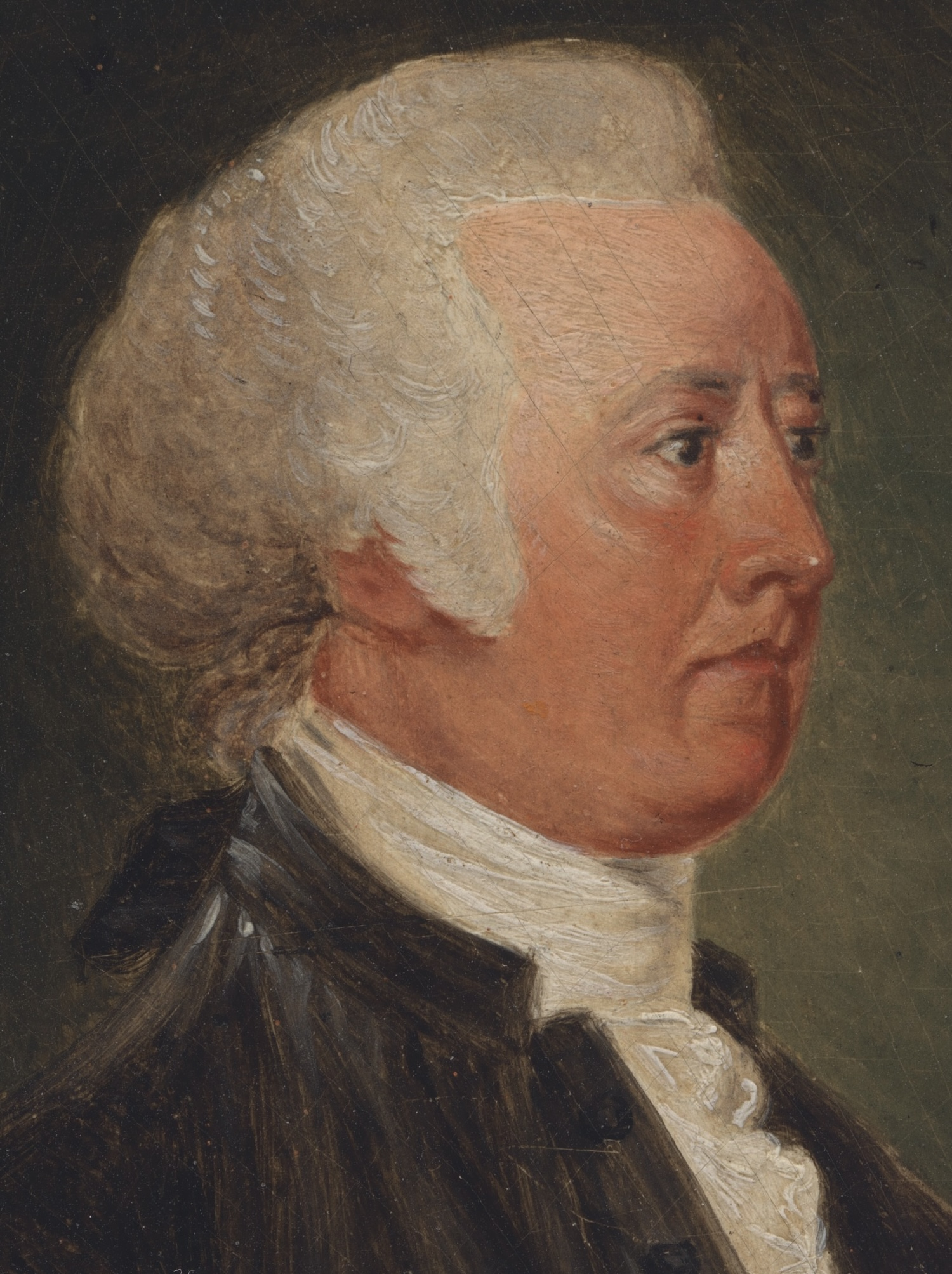
Former Governor
John Rutledge
of South Carolina

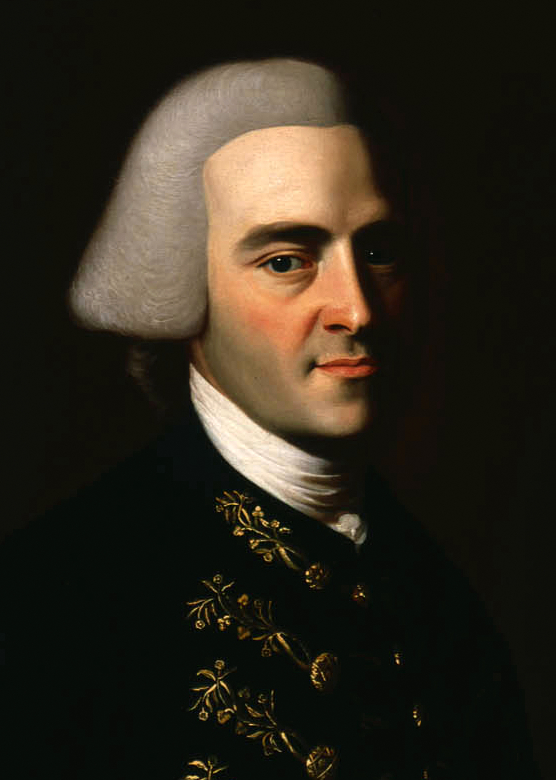
Governor
John Hancock
of Massachusetts

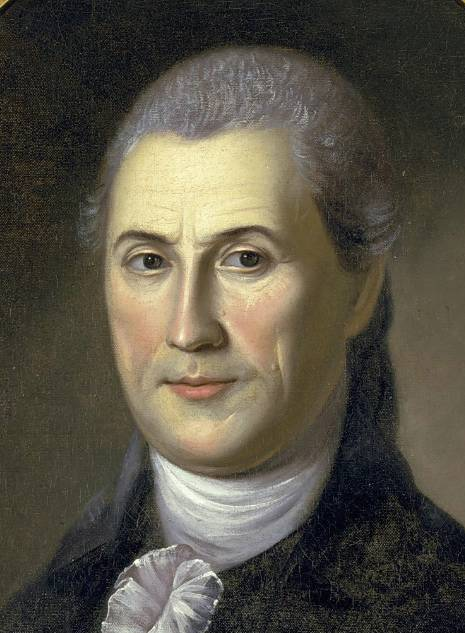
Governor
Samuel Huntington
of Connecticut

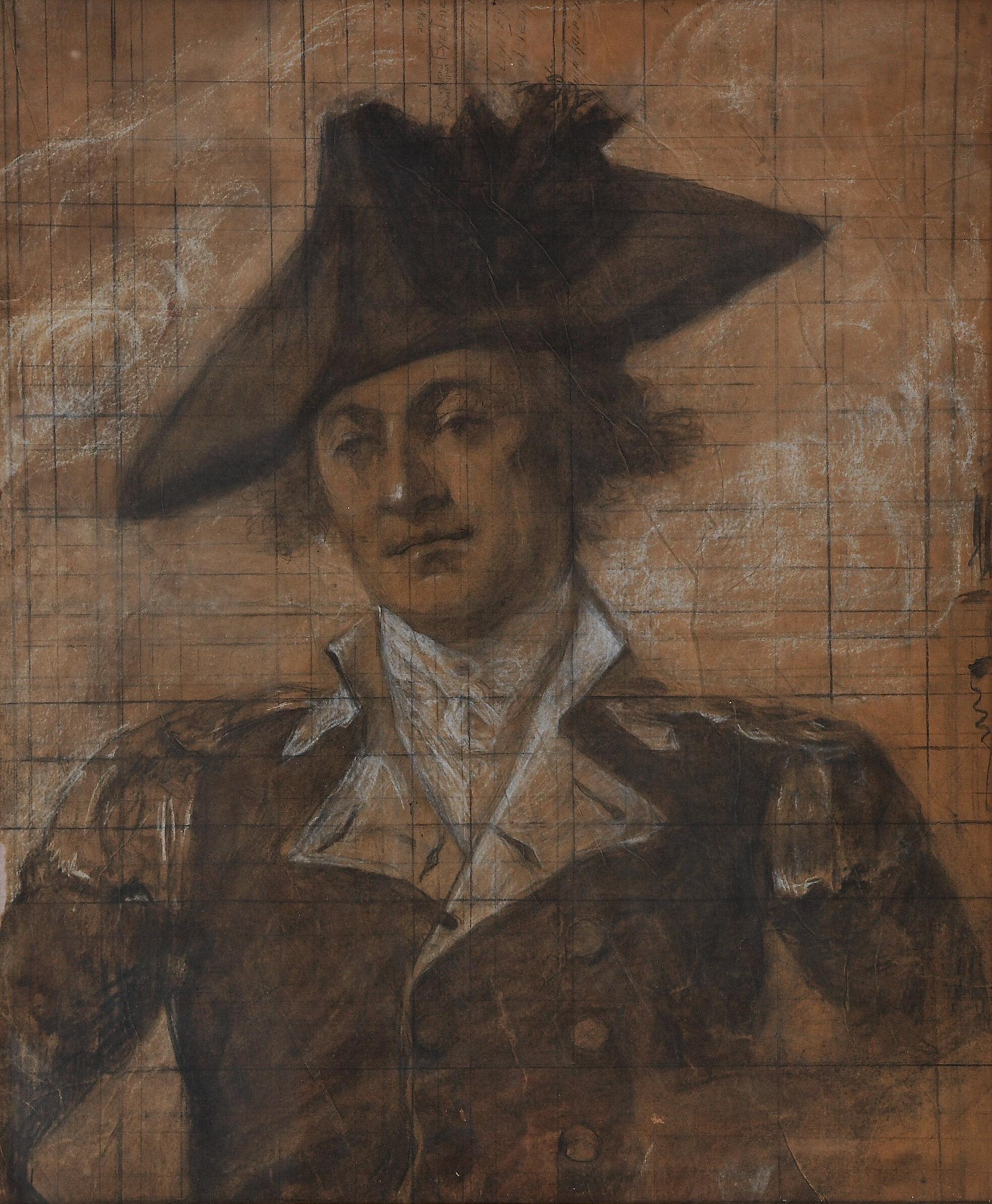
Judge
Robert H. Harrison
of Maryland

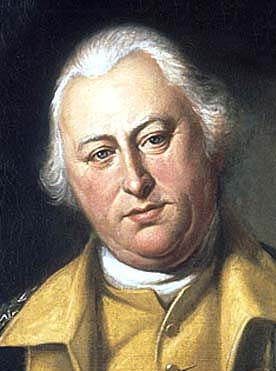
Lieutenant Governor
Benjamin Lincoln
of Massachusetts

=== Anti-Federalist candidates ===
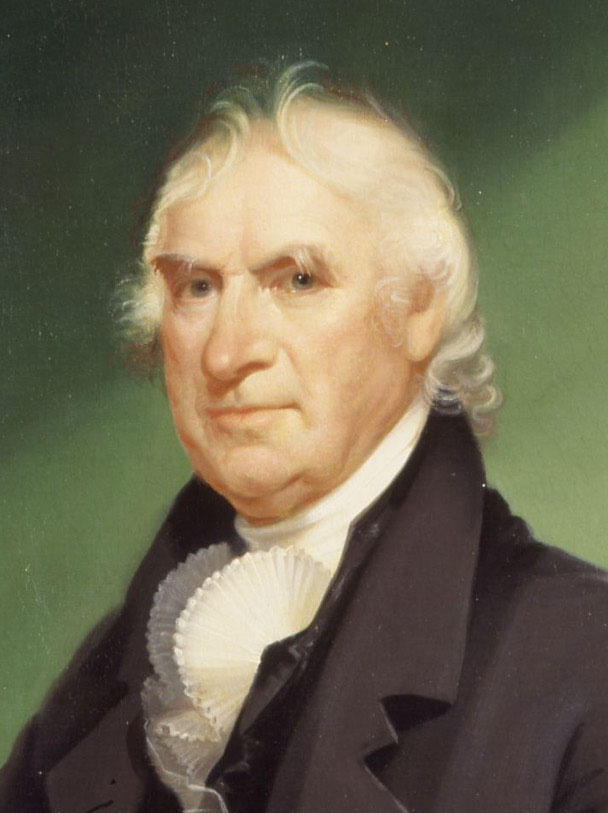
Governor
George Clinton
of New York

== General election ==
No nomination process existed at the time of planning, and thus, the framers of the Constitution presumed that Washington would be elected unopposed. For example, Alexander Hamilton spoke for national opinion when in a letter to Washington attempting to persuade him to leave retirement on his farm in Mount Vernon to serve as the first president, he wrote that "...the point of light in which you stand at home and abroad will make an infinite difference in the respectability in which the government will begin its operations in the alternative of your being or not being the head of state."

Another uncertainty was the choice for the vice presidency, which contained no definite job description beyond being the president's designated successor and presiding over the Senate. The Constitution stipulated that the position would be awarded to the runner-up in the presidential election. Because Washington was from Virginia, then the largest state, many assumed that electors would choose a vice president from a northern state. In an August 1788 letter, U.S. Minister to France Thomas Jefferson wrote that he considered John Adams and John Hancock, both from Massachusetts, to be the top contenders. Jefferson suggested John Jay, John Rutledge, and Virginian James Madison as other possible candidates. Adams received 34 electoral votes, one short of a majority, but because the Constitution did not require an outright majority in the Electoral College prior to ratification of the Twelfth Amendment to elect a runner-up as vice president, Adams was elected to that post.

The outgoing Congress of the Confederation announced the procedure for the election on September 13, 1788, stipulating that all electors must be chosen on the first Wednesday in January (January 7, 1789), and that the electors must assemble to cast their votes for president and vice president on the first Wednesday in February (February 4). However, the states differed in their interpretations of this procedure and of the relevant portions of the new Constitution. New Hampshire and Massachusetts held a popular vote for their presidential electors alongside the elections for their representatives in the new Congress, on December 15 and December 18, respectively. In these two states, the legislatures ultimately chose the electors based on the voting results on the appointed day, January 7. In Delaware, Maryland, Pennsylvania, and Virginia, the electors were chosen directly by the popular vote on January 7. In Connecticut, Georgia, and South Carolina, the electors were appointed by the legislature alone on January 7, while in New Jersey the governor and council selected them on that day. The legislature in New York was unable to agree on a method for choosing the electors before January 7, and so the state could not appoint any electors.

Voter turnout comprised a low single-digit percentage of the adult population. Though all states allowed some rudimentary form of popular vote, only six ratifying states allowed any form of popular vote specifically for presidential electors. In most states only white men, and in many only those who owned property, could vote. Free black men could vote in four Northern states, and women could vote in New Jersey until 1804. In some states, there was a nominal religious test for voting. For example, in Massachusetts and Connecticut, the Congregational Church was established, supported by taxes. Voting was hampered by poor communications and infrastructure and the labor demands imposed by farming. Two months passed after the election before the votes were counted and Washington was notified that he had been elected president. Washington spent eight days traveling from Virginia to New York for the inauguration. Congress took twenty-eight days to assemble.

As the electors were selected, politics intruded, and the process was not free of rumors and intrigue. For example, Hamilton aimed to ensure that Adams did not inadvertently tie Washington in the electoral vote. Also, Federalists spread rumors that Anti-Federalists plotted to elect Richard Henry Lee or Patrick Henry president, with George Clinton as vice president. However, Clinton received only three electoral votes.

== Results ==
=== Popular vote ===
	Popular vote^{(a), (b), (c)}	
	Count	Percentage
Federalist electors	26,299	78.60%
Anti-Federalist electors	7,161	21.40%
Total	33,460	100%

Source: A New Nation Votes: American Election Returns, 1787–1825. American Antiquarian Society.

^{(a)} Only six of the 11 states eligible to cast electoral votes chose electors by any form of popular vote.
^{(b)} Less than 1.8% of the population voted: the 1790 census would count a total population of 3.0 million with a free population of 2.4 million and 600,000 slaves in those states casting electoral votes.
^{(c)} Those states that did choose electors by popular vote had widely varying restrictions on suffrage via property requirements.

=== Electoral vote ===
Presidential candidate	Party	Home state	Popular vote^{(a), (b), (c)}		Electoral vote^{(d), (e), (f)}
Presidential candidate	Party	Home state	Count	Percentage	Electoral vote^{(d), (e), (f)}
George Washington	Independent	Virginia	33,460	100%	69
John Adams	Federalist	Massachusetts	—	—	34
John Jay	Federalist	New York	—	—	9
Robert H. Harrison	Federalist	Maryland	—	—	6
John Rutledge	Federalist	South Carolina	—	—	6
John Hancock	Federalist	Massachusetts	—	—	4
George Clinton	Anti-Federalist	New York	—	—	3
Samuel Huntington	Federalist	Connecticut	—	—	2
John Milton	Federalist	Georgia	—	—	2
James Armstrong^{(g)}	Federalist	Georgia^{(g)}	—	—	1
Benjamin Lincoln	Federalist	Massachusetts	—	—	1
Edward Telfair	Federalist	Georgia	—	—	1
Total			33,460	100.0%	69
Needed to win					35

Source: "Electoral College Box Scores 1789–1996". National Archives and Records Administration.
Source (popular vote): A New Nation Votes: American Election Returns, 1787–1825. American Antiquarian Society.

^{(a)} Only 6 of the 10 states casting electoral votes chose electors by any form of the popular vote.
^{(b)} Less than 1.8% of the population voted: the 1790 census would count a total population of 3.0 million with a free population of 2.4 million and 600,000 slaves in those states casting electoral votes.
^{(c)} Those states that did choose electors by popular vote had widely varying restrictions on suffrage via property requirements.
^{(d)} As the New York legislature failed to appoint its allotted eight electors in time, there were no voting electors from New York.
^{(e)} Two electors from Maryland did not vote.
^{(f)} One elector from Virginia did not vote and another elector from Virginia was not chosen because an election district failed to submit returns.
^{(g)} The identity of this candidate comes from The Documentary History of the First Federal Elections (Gordon DenBoer (ed.), University of Wisconsin Press, 1984, p. 441). Several respected sources, including the Biographical Directory of the United States Congress and the Political Graveyard, show this individual to be James Armstrong of Pennsylvania. However, primary sources, such as the Senate Journal, list only Armstrong's name, not his state. Skeptics observe that Armstrong received his single vote from a Georgia elector. They find this improbable because Armstrong of Pennsylvania was not nationally famous—his public service to that date consisted of being a medical officer during the American Revolution and, at most, a single year as a Pennsylvania judge.

Popular vote
Washington (total)	100%
Federalists	79.7%
Anti-Federalists	20.3%

Electoral vote (Note: Electors voted for two candidates; percentages are calculated as a share of the total number of electors.)
Washington	100%
Adams	49.3%
Jay	13.0%
Harrison	8.7%
Rutledge	8.7%
Hancock	5.8%
Clinton	4.3%
Huntington	3.0%
Milton	3.0%
Armstrong	1.4%
Lincoln	1.4%
Telfair	1.4%

=== Results by state ===
==== Popular vote ====
Early presidential elections used a form of plurality block voting that preceded the widespread adoption of the general ticket. Under this system, voters elected each member of the Electoral College individually; electors nominated by the same political party often received differing numbers of votes as a consequence of voter rolloff, split-ticket voting, or electoral fusion. In most cases, this table calculates the popular vote of each state based on the votes for the leading Federalist and Anti-Federalist electors in each constituent county or township. In states where the electors were chosen from single-member districts, all votes for Federalist and Anti-Federalist electors are counted. Most townships in New Hampshire are missing data for this election; the figure shown is the result for the leading Federalist elector statewide. Because published compilations of the election results are missing labels for many electors, the estimate presented here is incomplete.

State	E.V.	George Washington Federalist			George Washington Anti-Federalist			Margin		Total	Cit.
State	E.V.	Votes	%	E.V.	Votes	%	E.V.	Votes	%	Total	Cit.
Connecticut	7	*		7	*		—	*		—	
Delaware	3	685	100	3	—		—	685	100	685	
Georgia	5	*		5	*		—	*		—	
Maryland	8	5,937	70.08	8 (Note: Two electors from Maryland did not vote.)	2,535	29.92	—	3,402	40.16	8,472	
Massachusetts	10	6,560	78.07	10	1,843	21.93	—	4,717	56.14	8,403	
New Hampshire	5	1,759	92.92	5	134	7.07	—	1,625	85.85	1,893	
New Jersey	6	*		6	*		—	*		—	
New York	8	*		— (Note: The New York State Legislature failed to appoint electors.)	*		—	*		—	
Pennsylvania	10	6,718	88.05	10	912	11.95	—	5,806	76.10	7,630	
South Carolina	7	*		7	*		—	*		—	
Virginia	12	4,640	72.76	8 (Note: One elector from Virginia did not vote. No elector was chosen from Virginia's 9th electoral district.)	1,737	27.24	3 (Note: One elector from Virginia did not vote. No elector was chosen from Virginia's 9th electoral district.)	2,903	45.52	6,377	
TOTAL	81	26,299	78.60	69	7,161	21.40	3	19,138	57.20	33,460	

==== Electoral vote ====
Sixty-nine electors voted out of a possible 91: Two electors from Maryland and two from Virginia did not vote, the New York State Legislature was deadlocked and the state's 8 electors were not appointed (see below), and North Carolina and Rhode Island with 7 and 3 electoral votes respectively had not yet ratified the Constitution. As per the terms of the unamended constitution, each elector was permitted two votes for president, with a majority of "the whole number of electors appointed" necessary to elect a president. Of the 69 participating electors, each cast one vote for Washington, who was elected president. Of the remaining candidates, only Adams, Jay, and Hancock received votes from more than one state; with 34 votes, Adams finished second behind only Washington, and by virtue of which fact was elected vice president.

State	E	EV	GW	JAd	JJ	RH	JR	JH	GC	SH	JM	JAr	BL	ET	Blank
Connecticut	7	14	7	5	—	—	—	—	—	2	—	—	—	—	—
Delaware	3	6	3	—	3	—	—	—	—	—	—	—	—	—	—
Georgia	5	10	5	—	—	—	—	—	—	—	2	1	1	1	—
Maryland	8	16	6	—	—	6	—	—	—	—	—	—	—	—	4
Massachusetts	10	20	10	10	—	—	—	—	—	—	—	—	—	—	—
New Hampshire	5	10	5	5	—	—	—	—	—	—	—	—	—	—	—
New Jersey	6	12	6	1	5	—	—	—	—	—	—	—	—	—	—
New York	8	16	—	—	—	—	—	—	—	—	—	—	—	—	16
Pennsylvania	10	20	10	8	—	—	—	2	—	—	—	—	—	—	—
South Carolina	7	14	7	—	—	—	6	1	—	—	—	—	—	—	—
Virginia	12	24	10	5	1	—	—	1	3	—	—	—	—	—	4
TOTAL	81	162	69	34	9	6	6	4	3	2	2	1	1	1	24
TO WIN	37	37													

Source: "The Electoral College Count for the Presidential Election of 1789". Washington Papers. University of Virginia.

==== Failure of New York to appoint electors ====
Control of the bicameral New York State Legislature was divided following ratification of the federal constitution, and lawmakers could not reach an agreement to appoint electors for the forthcoming presidential contest. Federalists, backed by the great landed families and the city commercial interests, were the largest faction in the Senate, the smaller of the two chambers for which roughly a quarter of the state's free white male population was eligible to vote; but in the House of Representatives, with its larger membership and electorate, Anti-Federalists representing the middling interests held the majority. The fight to ratify the United States Constitution was still fresh in the memories of the legislators, and the Anti-Federalists were resentful for having been forced by events to accept the constitution without amendments. Bills to govern the selection of electors were proposed in each house and rejected by the other, leading to an impasse. The deadlock still stood on January 7, 1789, the last day for electors to be chosen by the states, and New York thus failed to appoint the eight electors allocated to it by the constitution.

=== Maps ===
Electoral College results (first vote)

Electoral College results (second vote)

Popular vote by state

Map of presidential election results by county, shaded according to the vote share of the highest result for an elector of any given faction

Map of presidential election results by electoral district, shaded according to the vote share of the highest result for an elector of any given faction. Data for several Virginian electoral districts could not be found

== Electoral college selection ==
The Constitution, in Article II, Section 1, provided that the state legislatures should decide the manner in which their Electors were chosen. State legislatures chose different methods:

Method of choosing electors	State(s)
electors appointed by state legislature	Connecticut; Georgia; New Jersey; New York^{(a)} South Carolina
two electors appointed by state legislature; each remaining elector chosen by state legislature from the two most popular candidates in each U.S. House district	Massachusetts
each elector chosen by voters statewide; however, if no candidate wins a majority, state legislature appoints electors from top ten candidates	New Hampshire
state divided into electoral districts, with one elector chosen per district by the voters of that district	Virginia^{(b)} Delaware
electors chosen at large by voters	Maryland; Pennsylvania
state had not yet ratified the Constitution	North Carolina; Rhode Island

^{(a)} New York's legislature did not choose electors on time.
^{(b)} One electoral district failed to choose an elector.

== See also ==
- 1788–89 United States House of Representatives elections
- 1788–89 United States Senate elections
- History of the United States (1789–1815)

== Bibliography ==
- Bowling, Kenneth R., and Donald R. Kennon. "A New Matrix for National Politics." Inventing Congress: Origins and Establishment of the First Federal Congress. Athens, O.: United States Capitol Historical Society by Ohio U, 1999. 110–37. Print.
- Chernow, Ron (2004). "Alexander Hamilton". London, UK: Penguin Books. ISBN 978-1101200858.
- Collier, Christopher. "Voting and American Democracy." The American People as Christian White Men of Property:Suffrage and Elections in Colonial and Early National America. N.p.: U of Connecticut, n.d, 1999.
- DenBoer, Gordon, ed. (1990). The Documentary History of the First Federal Elections, 1788–1790. University of Wisconsin Press. ISBN 978-0-299-06690-1.
- Dinkin, Robert J. Voting in Revolutionary America: A Study of Elections in the Original Thirteen States, 1776–1789. Westport, CT: Greenwood, 1982.
- Ellis, Richard J. (1999). Founding the American Presidency. Rowman & Littlefield. ISBN 978-0-8476-9499-0.
- McCullough, David (1990). John Adams. Simon & Schuster. ISBN 978-1-4165-7588-7.
- Meacham, Jon (2012). Thomas Jefferson: The Art of Power. Random House. ISBN 978-1-4000-6766-4.
- Novotny, Patrick. The Parties in American Politics, 1789–2016.
- Paullin, Charles O. "The First Elections Under The Constitution." The Iowa Journal of History and Politics 2 (1904): 3-33. Web. February 20, 2017.
- Shade, William G., and Ballard C. Campbell. "The Election of 1788-89." American Presidential Campaigns and Elections. Ed. Craig R. Coenen. Vol. 1. Armonk, NY: Sharpe Reference, 2003. 65–77. Print.
