= Robert H. Harrison =

American judge (1745–1790)

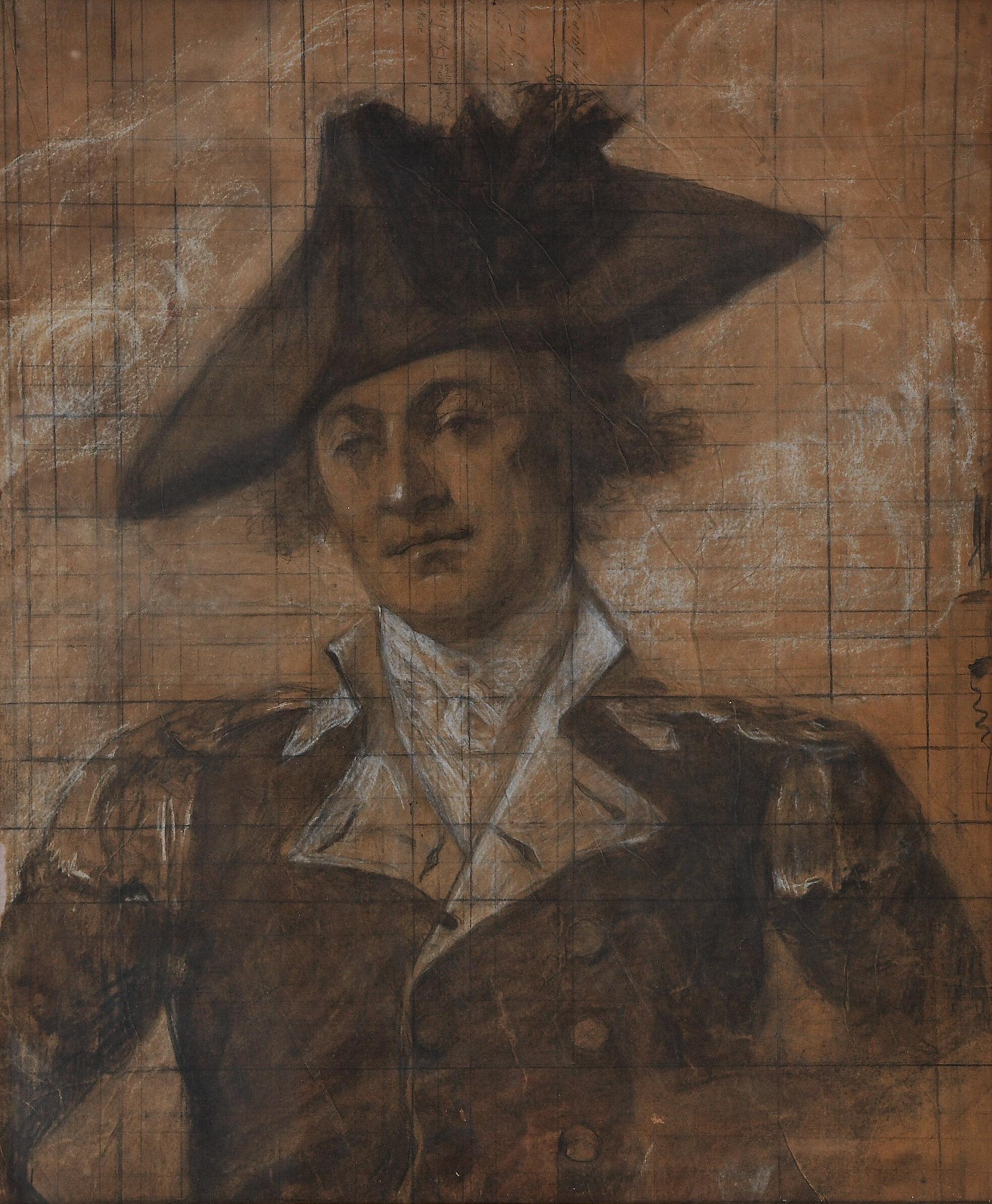
- Sketch by John Trumbull, c. 1786-1790

Personal details
- Born: April 1, 1745 Charles County, Province of Maryland
- Died: April 2, 1790 (aged 45) Charles County, Maryland, U.S.
- Party: Federalist
- Occupation: Attorney; Judge

Military service
- Allegiance: United States of America
- Branch/service: Virginia Militia; Continental Army
- Years of service: 1774-1775 (Militia); 1775-1781 (Army)
- Rank: Lieutenant Colonel
- Unit: Fairfax Independent Company (Militia); Staff of General George Washington (Army)
- Battles/wars: American Revolution

Robert Hanson Harrison (April 1, 1745 – April 2, 1790) was an American Army officer, attorney, and judge. He was a Continental Army veteran of the American Revolution and is most notable for his service as George Washington's military secretary, the de facto chief of staff of Washington's headquarters for most of the war.

== Early life ==
Born in Charles County, Maryland on April 1, 1745, Robert Hanson Harrison was the son of Dorothy Hanson Harrison and Colonel Richard Harrison, of which the latter served in offices including justice of the peace and member of the Maryland House of Delegates. John Hanson, who was his first cousin once removed, was the first President of the Congress of the United States under the Articles of Confederation. He was also the second cousin of Alexander Contee Hanson Sr. Little is known of the younger Harrison's early life and education, but his mother Dorothy died in 1751. Harrison settled in Fairfax County in 1765 and was admitted to the bar.

== Early career ==
By 1768, Harrison had a steady practice; after meeting Washington, Harrison represented him on several legal matters. He was an associate of George Mason as well. In the years prior to the American Revolution, Harrison became identified with the Patriot cause in Virginia; he supported the Virginia Nonimportation Resolves in 1770, and served as the clerk for the Fairfax Resolves in 1774. He was also a frequent visitor of Mount Vernon. He married Sarah Johnston, a daughter of George Johnston Sr. sometime between 1765 and 1772. Harrison was also a member of Alexandria's Committee of Correspondence. Additionally, he joined the militia and served as an officer in the Fairfax Independent Company in 1774 and 1775. In September 1775, Harrison was commissioned as a major in the Fairfax County Militia.

== American Revolution ==
On November 6, 1775, Robert Hanson Harrison was appointed an aide-de-camp to General Washington. It appears that he hesitated before accepting the appointment, as being an aide would take him far away from home, and his two young daughters were motherless after his wife Sarah's death. It was not an easy decision for Harrison, as his daughters needed his care, but the Revolution and the request of Washington were most compelling. His sister-in-law offered to take the daughters into her own family, which was likely the deciding factor. With him being assured that his daughters would be safe and properly cared for, he set out for Washington's headquarters. The following May, Harrison was appointed military secretary to General Washington in lieu of Joseph Reed. He and Alexander Hamilton became close friends, with Harrison hovering over him protectingly. The "old secretary" as Harrison was always called, dubbed Hamilton "the little lion". The Continental Congress approved his commission as a lieutenant colonel on June 5, 1776. In this capacity, he assisted with the drafting, writing and organization of the Commander-in-Chief's voluminous correspondence for almost five years. Moreover, President James Monroe testified that "in all the actions in which General Washington commanded, Colonel Harrison was present, near the person of the General." Along with Alexander Hamilton, Robert Hanson Harrison negotiated for the exchange of prisoners of war. The death of his father, Richard Harrison, in 1780 began a chain of events that led to Robert Hanson Harrison's resignation from the Continental Army in the spring of 1781. George Washington attested that Robert Hanson Harrison discharged his duty "with conspicuous abilities – That his whole conduct during all the interesting periods of the war has been distinguished marked by the strictest integrity and the most attentive & faithful services while by personal bravery he has marked his conduct upon many occasions been distinguished on sev[era]l occasions"

== Later career ==
Returning to Maryland, Robert Hanson Harrison was appointed Chief Justice of the General Court of Maryland on March 12, 1781. During the war, Harrison's court considered property confiscation cases for individuals accused of disloyalty to the United States. Despite being considered a highly capable judge, he declined appointments to higher courts because of failing health, including Chancellor of Maryland.

In the 1788–89 presidential election, he received 6 electoral votes from his home state, Maryland.

On September 24, 1789, President George Washington nominated Harrison as an associate justice on the newly established United States Supreme Court. The United States Senate confirmed his appointment two days later. Harrison declined the appointment, citing familial responsibilities and his health as two prime reasons.

Washington and Hamilton urged Harrison to reconsider. Washington's friend Dr. James Craik urged him to send Harrison a personal appeal, believing "A Letter from you…would I am convinced act more powerfully upon him than all the Anodynes in an Apothecarys Shop". Harrison agreed to accept, and began the trip to New York City, then the temporary national capital. His health worsened, and he returned home to Bladensburg, Maryland. In a January 21, 1790 letter to Washington, Harrison informed Washington that he was unable to make the trip and again declined the appointment. Washington appointed James Iredell in his position.

== Personal life and legacy ==
Harrison's first wife was Sarah Johnston, a daughter of George Johnston Sr. (d. 1766), a prominent Virginia attorney and political leader. After her death, he married Grace Dent of Charles County, Maryland.

Harrison died at his home in Charles County on April 2, 1790. His burial location is not known.

The Maryland Historical Magazine dubbed Harrison "A Lost Man of Maryland" in the title of their segment about him in a magazine published in 1940, and the Baltimore Sun dubbed him a "lost hero of the Revolutionary era". This is in reference to the fact Harrison is largely unknown and forgotten amongst the general public.
