= 1792 United States presidential election in Pennsylvania =

- November 2, 1792 – December 5, 1792
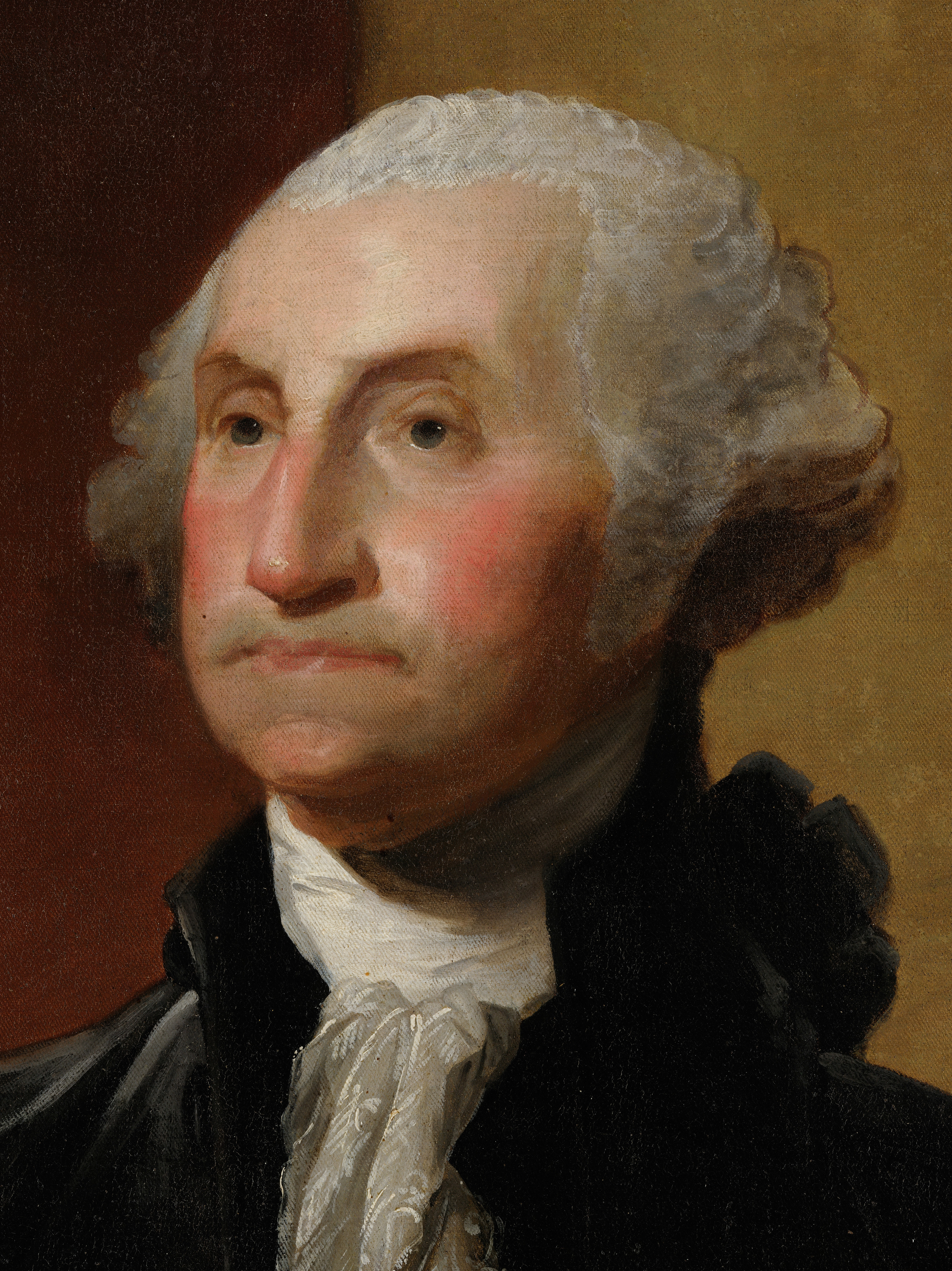

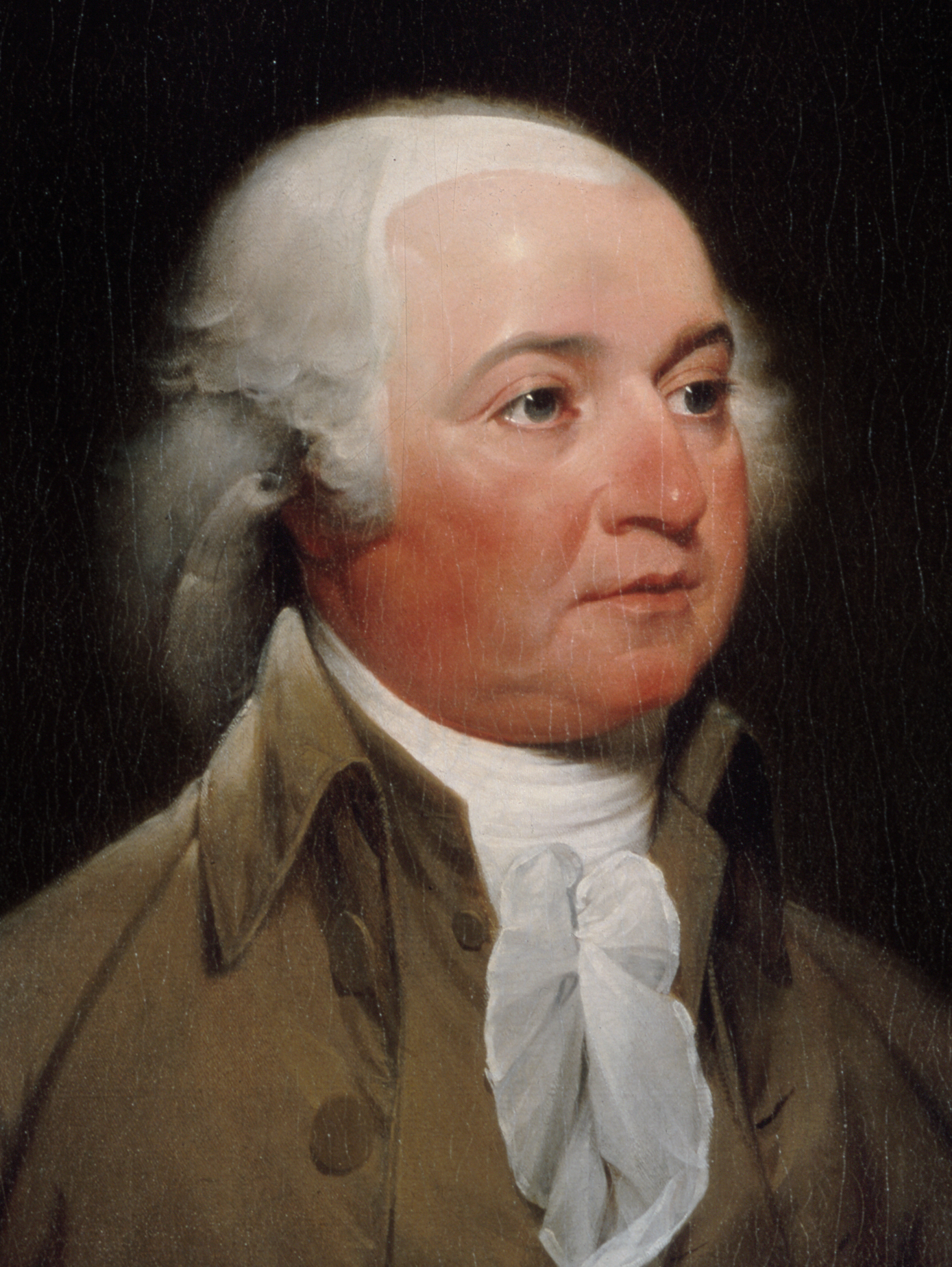

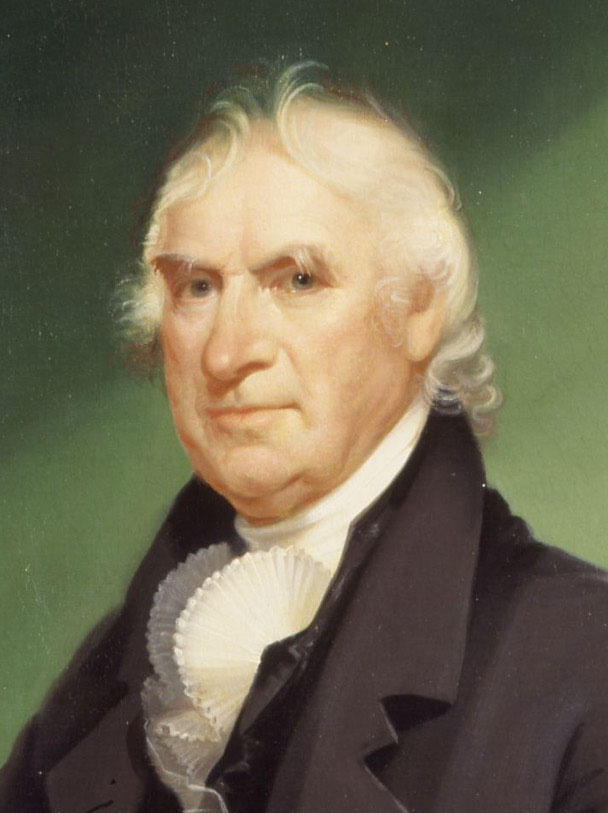
| Nominee | George Washington | John Adams | George Clinton |
| Party | Independent | Federalist | Democratic-Republican |
| Home state | Virginia | Massachusetts | New York |
| Electoral vote | 15 | 14 | 1 |
| Popular vote | 3,606 | – | – |
| Percentage | 100.00% | – | – |
County results
Washington/Adams (Federalist)
50-60%
70-80%
90-100%
Tie
50%
President before election
George Washington
Independent
Elected President
George Washington
Independent

A presidential election was held in Pennsylvania in 1792, as part of the 1792 United States presidential election. Pennsylvania voters chose 15 members of the Electoral College, each of whom, under the provisions of the Constitution prior to the passage of the Twelfth Amendment, cast two votes for President.

Pennsylvania unanimously voted for nonpartisan candidate and incumbent President George Washington. The two best performing electors in Pennsylvania, Joseph Hiester and William Henry, were supported by both parties. They received 3,396 and 3,371 votes respectively. It is not known which one voted for Clinton. The total for Washington only includes the 3,396 number as to not represent Pennsylvanian voters twice in popular vote figures.

== Results by presidential candidates ==
1792 United States presidential election in Pennsylvania
| Party | Candidate | Votes | % |
|---|---|---|---|
| Independent | George Washington | 3,606 | 100.00% |
| Total votes | | 3,606 | 100.00% |

=== Results by county ===
1792 United States presidential election in Pennsylvania
| County | George Washington Independent | | Margin | | Total (Note: Results for George Washington are taken from the highest voted elector with either a formal ticket pledge, or a submitted electoral vote, for each county.) |
| County | # | % | # | % | Total |
|---|---|---|---|---|---|
| Allegheny | 53 | 100.00% | 53 | 100.00% | 53 |
| Bedford | No data | | No data | | |
| Berks | 150 | 100.00% | 150 | 100.00% | 150 |
| Bucks | 398 | 100.00% | 398 | 100.00% | 398 |
| Chester | 160 | 100.00% | 160 | 100.00% | 160 |
| Cumberland | 173 | 100.00% | 173 | 100.00% | 173 |
| Dauphin | 161 | 100.00% | 161 | 100.00% | 161 |
| Delaware | 60 | 100.00% | 60 | 100.00% | 60 |
| Fayette | 49 | 100.00% | 49 | 100.00% | 49 |
| Franklin | No data | | No data | | |
| Huntingdon | 53 | 100.00% | 53 | 100.00% | 53 |
| Lancaster | 204 | 100.00% | 204 | 100.00% | 204 |
| Luzerne | 47 | 100.00% | 47 | 100.00% | 47 |
| Mifflin | No data | | No data | | |
| Montgomery | 163 | 100.00% | 163 | 100.00% | 163 |
| Northampton | 187 | 100.00% | 187 | 100.00% | 187 |
| Northumberland | 85 | 100.00% | 85 | 100.00% | 85 |
| Philadelphia | 210 | 100.00% | 210 | 100.00% | 210 |
| Philadelphia City | 812 | 100.00% | 812 | 100.00% | 812 |
| Washington | No data | | No data | | |
| Westmoreland | No data | | No data | | |
| York | 641 | 100.00% | 641 | 100.00% | 641 |
| Total | 3,606 | 100.00% | 3,606 | 100.00% | 3.606 |

=== Results by district ===
1792 United States presidential election in Pennsylvania
| District | E.V. | George Washington Independent | | | Margin | | Total (Note: Results for George Washington are taken from the highest voted elector with either a formal ticket pledge, or a submitted electoral vote, for each district.) |
| District | E.V. | # | % | E.V. | # | % | Total |
|---|---|---|---|---|---|---|---|
| At-large | 15 | 3,606 | 100.00% | 15 | 3,606 | 100.00% | 3,606 |
| Total | 15 | 3,606 | 100.00% | 15 | 3,606 | 100.00% | 3,606 |

== Results by presidential electors ==
1792 United States presidential election in Pennsylvania
| Party | Candidate | Votes | % |
|---|---|---|---|
| Federalist | Federalist electors | 3,137 | 65.58% |
| Democratic-Republican | Democratic-Republican electors | 1,437 | 31.42% |
| Total votes | | 4,574 | 100.00% |

=== Results by county ===
1792 United States presidential election in Pennsylvania
| County | Federalist electors | | Democratic-Republican electors | | Margin | | Total (Note: Results are taken from the highest voted federalist, and anti-federalist elector for each county.) |
| County | # | % | # | % | # | % | Total |
|---|---|---|---|---|---|---|---|
| Allegheny | 53 | 50.00% | 53 | 50.00% | 0 | 0.00% | 106 |
| Bedford | No data | | No data | | No data | | |
| Berks | 150 | 63.03% | 88 | 36.97% | 62 | 26.06% | 238 |
| Bucks | 214 | 52.07% | 197 | 47.93% | 17 | 4.14% | 411 |
| Chester | 155 | 69.20% | 69 | 30.80% | 86 | 38.40% | 224 |
| Cumberland | 173 | 50.00% | 173 | 50.00% | 0 | 0.00% | 346 |
| Dauphin | 121 | 51.93% | 112 | 48.07% | 9 | 3.86% | 233 |
| Delaware | 60 | 92.31% | 5 | 7.69% | 55 | 84.62% | 65 |
| Fayette | 49 | 50.00% | 49 | 50.00% | 0 | 0.00% | 98 |
| Franklin | No data | | No data | | No data | | |
| Huntingdon | 53 | 63.86% | 30 | 36.14% | 23 | 27.72% | 83 |
| Lancaster | 204 | 98.55% | 3 | 1.45% | 201 | 97.10% | 207 |
| Luzerne | 47 | 97.92% | 1 | 2.08% | 46 | 95.84% | 48 |
| Mifflin | No data | | No data | | No data | | |
| Montgomery | 135 | 56.72% | 103 | 43.28% | 32 | 13.44% | 238 |
| Northampton | 120 | 44.61% | 149 | 55.39% | -29 | -10.78% | 269 |
| Northumberland | 75 | 46.58% | 86 | 53.42% | -11 | -6.84% | 161 |
| Philadelphia | 164 | 74.55% | 56 | 25.45% | 108 | 49.10% | 220 |
| Philadelphia City | 723 | 74.54% | 247 | 25.46% | 476 | 49.08% | 970 |
| Washington | No data | | No data | | No data | | |
| Westmoreland | No data | | No data | | No data | | |
| York | 641 | 97.56% | 16 | 2.44% | 625 | 95.12% | 657 |
| Total | 3,137 | 68.58% | 1,437 | 31.42% | 1,700 | 37.16% | 4,574 |

==== Results by county swing ====
Swing compared to the 1788-89 election
| County | Party | | Status |
| County | Federalist | Democratic-Republican / Anti-Federalist (Note: Swing data compares Democratic-Republican performance to previous Anti-Federalist performance. The Democratic-Republican party is considered to be the direct evolution of the Anti-Federalist coalition.) | Status |
| County | ± pp | ± pp | Status |
|---|---|---|---|
| Allegheny | No data | No data | New |
| Bedford | No data | No data | N/A |
| Berks | ▼30.50 pp | ▲30.50 pp | Loss |
| Bucks | ▼47.93 pp | ▲47.93 pp | Loss |
| Chester | ▲12.20 pp | ▼12.20 pp | Gain |
| Cumberland | ▼43.57 pp | ▲43.57 pp | Tied |
| Dauphin | ▼13.15 pp | ▲13.15 pp | Loss |
| Delaware | No data | No data | New |
| Fayette | No data | No data | N/A |
| Franklin | No data | No data | N/A |
| Huntingdon | ▼15.09 pp | ▲15.09 pp | Loss |
| Lancaster | ▲0.16 pp | ▼0.16 pp | Gain |
| Luzerne | ▼2.08 pp | ▲2.08 pp | Loss |
| Mifflin | No data | No data | New |
| Montgomery | ▼38.56 pp | ▲38.56 pp | Loss |
| Northampton | ▼36.19 pp | ▲36.19 pp | Flip |
| Northumberland | ▼53.42 pp | ▲53.42 pp | Flip |
| Philadelphia | ▼24.99 pp | ▲24.99 pp | Loss |
| Philadelphia City | ▼24.44 pp | ▲24.44 pp | Loss |
| Washington | No data | No data | N/A |
| Westmoreland | No data | No data | N/A |
| York | ▼2.32 pp | ▲2.32 pp | Loss |
| Total | ▼19.47 pp | ▲19.47 pp | Loss |

=== Results by district ===
1792 United States presidential election in Pennsylvania
| District | E.V. | Federalist electors | | | Democratic-Republican electors | | | Margin | | Total (Note: Results are taken from the highest voted federalist, and anti-federalist elector for each county.) |
| District | E.V. | # | % | E.V. | # | % | E.V. | # | % | Total |
|---|---|---|---|---|---|---|---|---|---|---|
| At-large | 15 | 3,137 | 68.58% | 14 | 1,437 | 31.42% | 1 | 1,700 | 37.16% | 4,574 |
| Total | 15 | 3,137 | 68.58% | 14 | 1,437 | 31.42% | 1 | 1,700 | 37.16% | 4,574 |

=== Results by elector ===
In Pennsylvania, there were two organized voting tickets, "the federal interest in Pennsylvania" and a opposing voting ticket called "Rights of Man". The "the federal interest in Pennsylvania" voting ticket received an average of 2,543 votes across all candidates. The opposing voting ticket "Rights of Man", received an average of 1,042 votes across all candidates. Voters showed clear, dividing bloc voting patterns in the official election returns. These clear dividing voting patterns support the split ticket averages reported. While no known record formally lists which electors belonged to each voting ticket, the average votes each ticket candidate received, and its supporting split voting bloc patterns, gives a clear, but secondary inference of which electors belonged to each voting ticket.

1792 United States presidential election in Pennsylvania
| Party | Candidate | Votes | % |
|---|---|---|---|
| Fusion | Joseph Hiester (Note: Supported by both parties for this election.) | 3,396 | 6.34% |
| Fusion | William Henry | 3,371 | 6.30% |
| Federalist | Thomas McKean (Note: Federalist the federal interest in Pennsylvania elector for this election.) | 2,794 | 5.22% |
| Federalist | Henry Miller | 2,605 | 4.87% |
| Federalist | John Wilkins Jr. | 2,548 | 4.76% |
| Federalist | Robert Coleman | 2,527 | 4.72% |
| Federalist | Thomas Bull | 2,500 | 4.67% |
| Federalist | Cornelius Cox | 2,421 | 4.52% |
| Federalist | John Boyd | 2,420 | 4.52% |
| Federalist | Robert Johnston | 2,401 | 4.49% |
| Federalist | David Stewart | 2,373 | 4.43% |
| Federalist | George Latimer | 2,371 | 4.43% |
| Federalist | Hugh Lloyd | 2,332 | 4.36% |
| Federalist | James Morris | 2,299 | 4.29% |
| Federalist | Robert Hare | 2,299 | 4.29% |
| Democratic-Republican | Charles Biddle (Note: Democratic-Republican Rights of Man elector for this election.) | 1,246 | 2.33% |
| Democratic-Republican | James McLene | 1,125 | 2.10% |
| Democratic-Republican | Samuel Maclay | 1,110 | 2.07% |
| Democratic-Republican | John Whitehill | 1,076 | 2.01% |
| Democratic-Republican | Jonathan Hodge | 1,048 | 1.96% |
| Democratic-Republican | John McDowell | 1,035 | 1.93% |
| Democratic-Republican | James Marshall | 1,029 | 1.92% |
| Democratic-Republican | James Morgan | 1,020 | 1.91% |
| Democratic-Republican | Francis Murray | 1,017 | 1.90% |
| Democratic-Republican | David Jackson | 985 | 1.84% |
| Democratic-Republican | William Todd | 981 | 1.83% |
| Federalist | James Ross (Note: Federalist candidate for the Pennsylvania House of Representatives in 1792,, and the Pennsylvania Senate in 1794.) | 974 | 1.82% |
| Democratic-Republican | Charles Broole | 958 | 1.79% |
| Democratic-Republican | Robert Loller | 949 | 1.77% |
| Federalist | John Carson (Note: Federalist candidate for the Pennsylvania House of Representatives in 1790, and 1791.) | 45 | 0.08% |
| Unknown | William Henderson | 39 | 0.07% |
| Unknown | Collinson Reed | 39 | 0.07% |
| Unknown | William Atlee | 30 | 0.06% |
| Unknown | Samuel Ogden | 30 | 0.06% |
| Unknown | William Hoge | 29 | 0.05% |
| Unknown | Benjamin Rittenhouse | 18 | 0.03% |
| Unknown | John Richards | 12 | 0.02% |
| Unknown | John Cadwalader | 10 | 0.02% |
| Unknown | Alexander Wilcox | 9 | 0.02% |
| Unknown | Samuel Miles | 9 | 0.02% |
| Unknown | Francis Gurney | 9 | 0.02% |
| Unknown | Thomas Craig | 9 | 0.02% |
| Federalist | Henry Wynkoop | 9 | 0.02% |
| Unknown | Samuel Postlethwaite | 9 | 0.02% |
| Federalist | Edward Hand | 8 | 0.01% |
| Federalist | James Armstrong | 6 | 0.01% |
| Federalist | Alexander Addison | 2 | 0.00% |
| Unknown | Samuel Potts | 1 | 0.00% |
| Total votes | | 53,533 | 100.00% |

== See also ==
- United States presidential elections in Pennsylvania
