= 1792 United States presidential election in New York =

- November 20, 1792
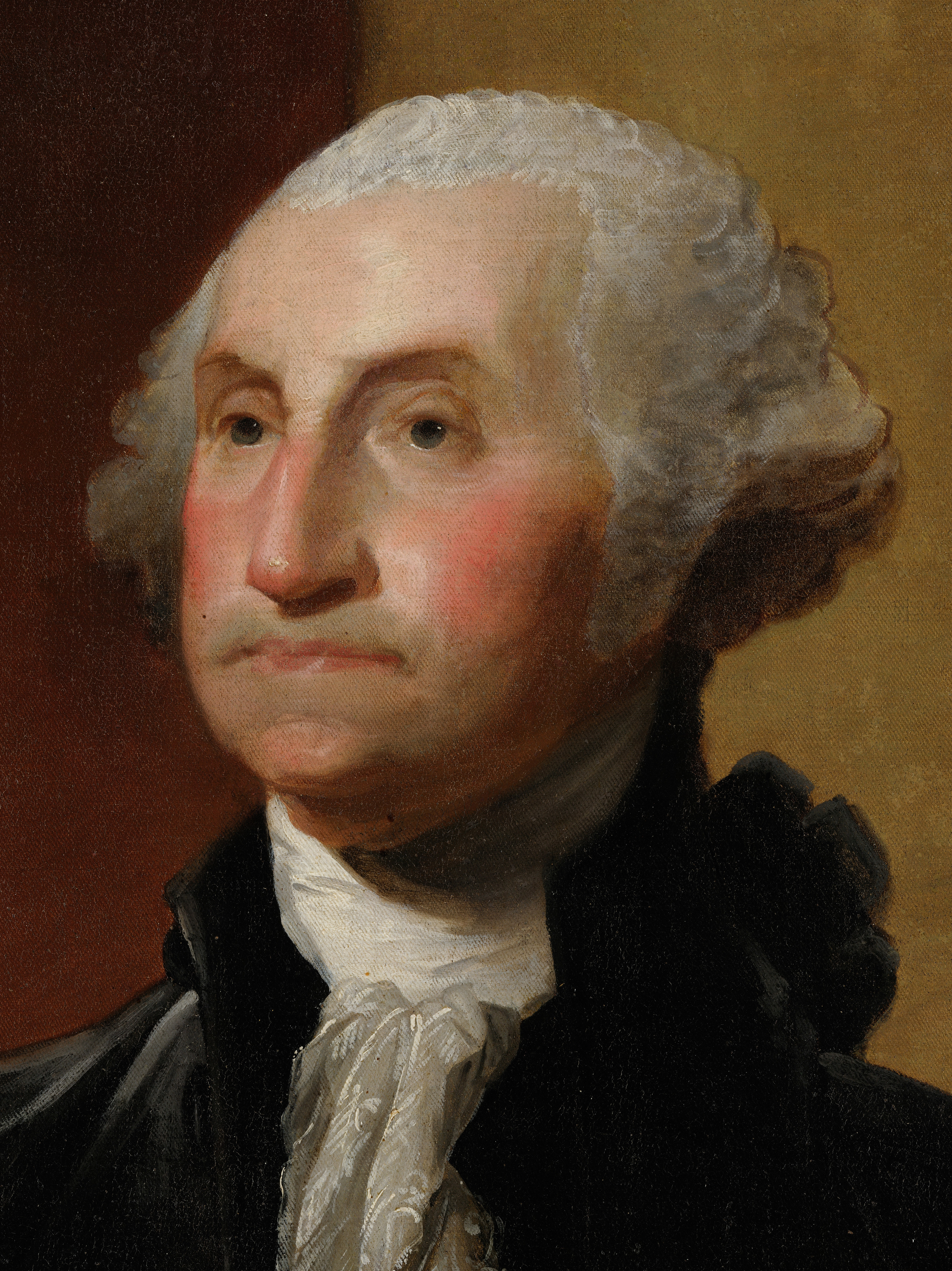

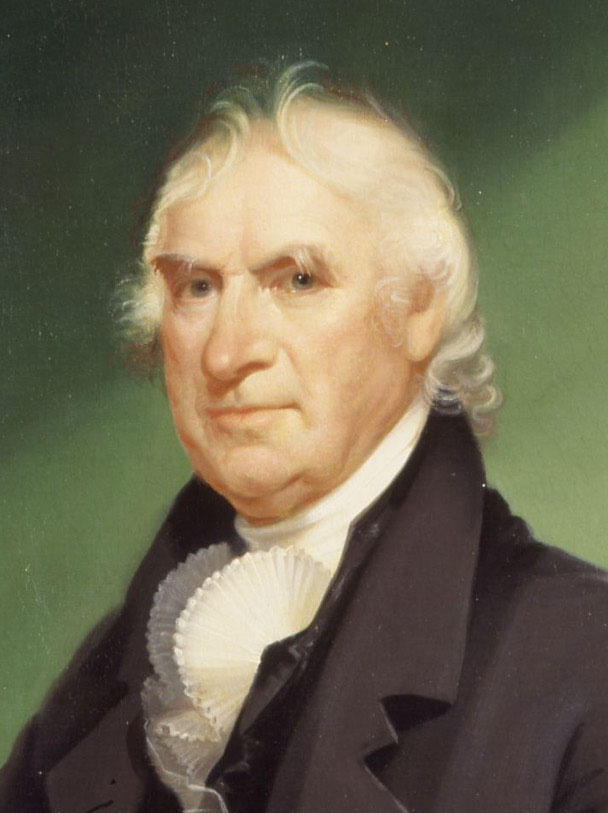
Nominee	George Washington	George Clinton
Party	Independent	Democratic-Republican
Home state	Virginia	New York
Electoral vote	12	12
Percentage	100.00%
President before election
George Washington
Independent
Elected President
George Washington
Independent

A presidential election was held in New York on November 20, 1792, as part of the 1792 United States presidential election. The New York State Legislature chose 12 members of the Electoral College, each of whom, under the provisions of the Constitution prior to the passage of the Twelfth Amendment, cast 2 votes for president.

New York's 12 electors each cast one vote for incumbent George Washington and one vote for George Clinton in the state's first presidential election. (Although the state had ratified the Constitution to become the eleventh state on July 26, 1788, it did not participate in the first presidential election in 1789 due to the state legislature's being deadlocked.)

== See also ==
- United States presidential elections in New York
