= 1792 United States presidential election =

Re-election of George Washington

- November 2 – December 5, 1792

132 members of the Electoral College 68 electoral (Note: 135 total electors were appointed, three of which did not vote (2 in Maryland and 1 in Vermont). According to the unamended constitution, a majority of the total number of appointed electors was required for election to the Presidency.) votes needed to win
- Turnout: 6.3% (▼5.3 pp)
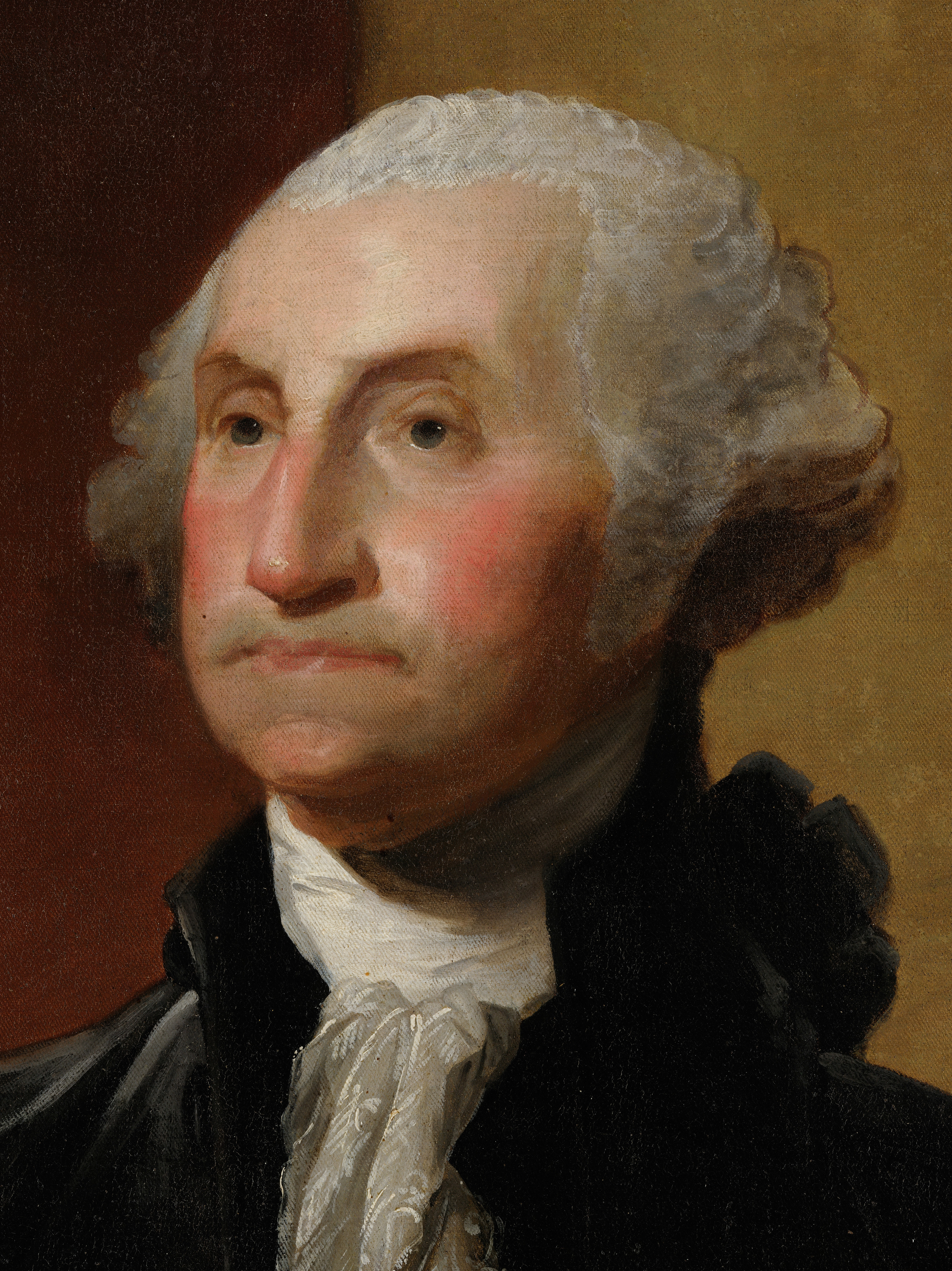
Nominee	George Washington
Party	Independent
Alliance	Federalist; Democratic-Republican
Home state	Virginia
Electoral vote	132
States carried	15
Popular vote	11,176
Percentage	100.0%
- Presidential election results map. Tan denotes states won by Washington. Numbers indicate the number of electoral votes cast by each state.
President before election
George Washington
Independent
Elected President
George Washington
Independent

A presidential election was held in the United States from November 2 to December 5, 1792. Incumbent President George Washington was elected to a second term by a unanimous vote once again in the electoral college, while John Adams was reelected as vice president. Washington was essentially unopposed, but Adams faced a competitive re-election against Governor George Clinton of New York.

Electoral rules of the time required each presidential elector to cast two votes without distinguishing which was for president and which for vice president. The recipient of the most votes would then become president, and the runner-up vice president. The Democratic-Republican Party, which had organized in opposition to the policies of Secretary of the Treasury Alexander Hamilton, supported Clinton for the position of vice president. Adams, meanwhile, was backed by the Federalist Party in his bid for another term. Neither party had fully organized, and partisan divisions had not yet solidified.

Washington received 132 electoral votes, one from each elector. Adams won 77 electoral votes, enough to win re-election. Clinton finished in third place with 50 electoral votes, taking his home state of New York as well as three Southern states. Two other candidates won the five remaining electoral votes. This election was the first in which each of the original 13 states appointed electors, as did the newly added states of Kentucky and Vermont.

== Candidates ==
In 1792, presidential elections were still conducted according to the original method established under the U.S. Constitution. Under this system, each elector cast two votes: the candidate who received the greatest number of votes (so long as they won a majority) became president, while the runner-up became vice president. The Twelfth Amendment would eventually replace this system, requiring electors to cast one vote for president and one vote for vice president, but this change did not take effect until 1804. Because of this, it is difficult to use modern-day terminology to describe the relationship among the candidates in this election.

Washington is generally held by historians to have run unopposed. Indeed, the incumbent president enjoyed bipartisan support and received one vote from every elector. The choice for vice president was more divisive. The Federalist Party threw its support behind the incumbent vice president, John Adams of Massachusetts, while the Democratic-Republican Party backed the candidacy of New York Governor George Clinton. Because few doubted that Washington would receive the greatest number of votes, Adams and Clinton were effectively competing for the vice presidency; under the letter of the law, however, they were technically candidates for president competing against Washington.

=== Federalist nomination ===
- George Washington, President of the United States (1789–1797)
- John Adams, Vice President of the United States (1789–1797)
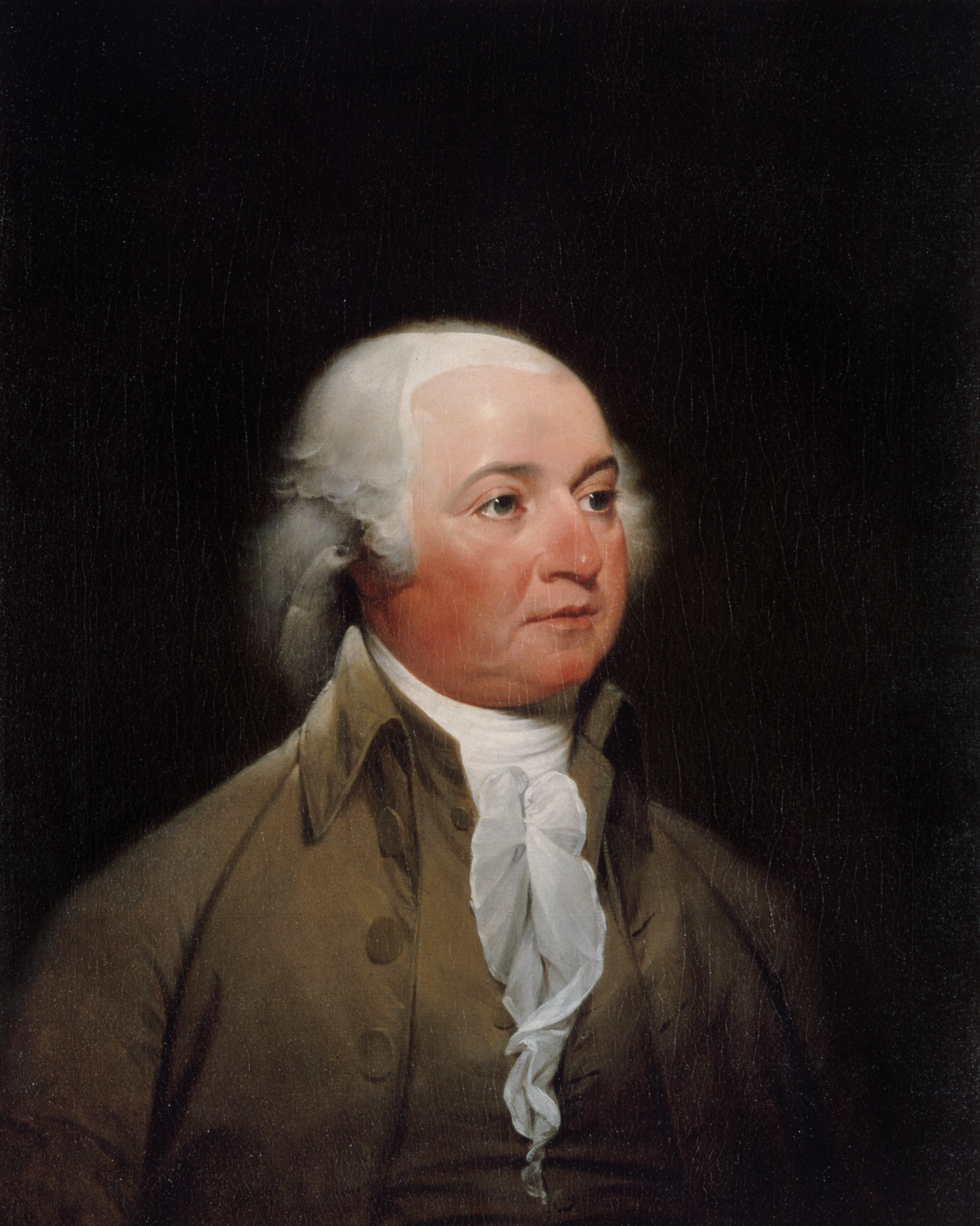
Vice President
John Adams
from Massachusetts

President
George Washington
from Virginia

=== Democratic-Republican nomination ===
- George Clinton, Governor of New York (1777–1795, 1801–1804)
- George Washington, President of the United States (1789–1797)

Born out of the Anti-Federalist faction that had opposed the Constitution in 1788, the Democratic-Republican Party was the main opposition to the agenda of Treasury Secretary Alexander Hamilton. They had no chance of unseating Washington, but hoped to win the vice presidency by defeating the incumbent, Adams. Many Democratic-Republicans would have preferred to nominate Thomas Jefferson, their ideological leader and Washington's Secretary of State. However, this would have cost them the state of Virginia, as electors were not permitted to vote for two candidates from their home state and Washington was also a Virginian. Clinton, the Governor of New York and a former anti-Federalist leader, became the party's nominee after he won the backing of Jefferson and James Madison. Clinton was from an electorally important swing state, and he convinced party leaders that he would be a stronger candidate than another New Yorker, Senator Aaron Burr. A group of Democratic-Republican leaders met in Philadelphia in October 1792 and selected Clinton as the party's vice presidential candidate.

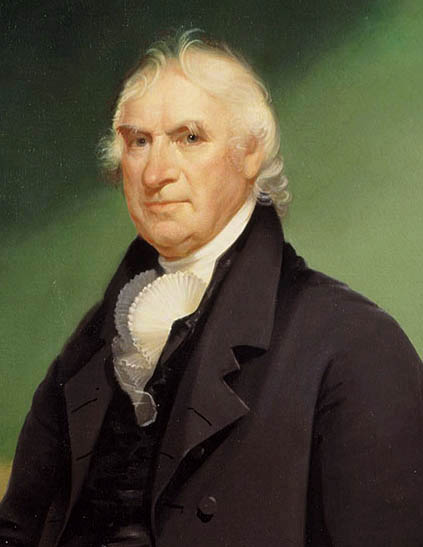
Governor
George Clinton
of New York

President
George Washington
from Virginia

== Campaign ==
By 1792, a party division had emerged between Federalists led by Treasury Secretary Alexander Hamilton, who desired a stronger federal government with a leading role in the economy, and the Democratic-Republicans led by Secretary of State Thomas Jefferson and Representative James Madison of Virginia, who favored states' rights and opposed Hamilton's economic program. Madison was at first a Federalist until he opposed the establishment of Hamilton's First Bank of the United States in 1791. He formed the Democratic-Republican Party along with Anti-Federalist Thomas Jefferson in 1792.

The elections of 1792 were the first ones in the United States to be contested on anything resembling a partisan basis. In most states, the congressional elections were recognized in some sense as a "struggle between the Treasury department and the republican interest," to use the words of Jefferson strategist John Beckley. In New York, the race for governor was fought along these lines. The candidates were Chief Justice John Jay, a Hamiltonian, and incumbent George Clinton, the party's vice presidential nominee.

Although Washington had been considering retiring, both sides encouraged him to remain in office to bridge factional differences. Washington was supported by practically all sides throughout his presidency and gained more popularity with the passage of the Bill of Rights. However, the Democratic-Republicans and the Federalists contested the vice-presidency, with incumbent John Adams as the Federalist nominee and George Clinton as the Democratic-Republican nominee. Federalists attacked Clinton for his past association with the anti-Federalists. Adams easily secured re-election.

== Results ==
Objections made to the electoral college votes of the 1792 U.S. presidential election. No objections

Congress counted the electoral results on February 13, 1793, with John Adams opening and reading the votes in his role as President of the Senate. Washington was re-elected unanimously, receiving one vote from each of the 132 participating electors. Adams received votes from 77 electors and Clinton 50; the four electors from Kentucky voted for Thomas Jefferson, and one South Carolina elector voted for Aaron Burr. The distribution of the electoral vote between the four runners-up showed a high degree of party discipline, with only two electors voting contrary to the majority in their state. Adams received the support of New England, South Carolina, and the Mid-Atlantic states (excepting New York), while Clinton carried New York and most of the South. Adams as the second-place finisher was elected vice president, serving until his election to the presidency in 1797; each of his three rivals would go on to serve as vice president in turn, Jefferson from 1797 to 1801 (when he alike succeeded to the presidency), Burr from 1801 to 1805, and Clinton from 1805 until his death in 1812.

Nine of the 15 states eligible to choose representatives to the electoral college did so by a vote of the state legislature; the remaining six employed some form of popular vote. Of these, complete returns from Maryland, Massachusetts, New Hampshire, and Pennsylvania survive; surviving returns from Virginia are incomplete, and popular vote records from Kentucky are not known to exist. Of the states with complete returns, only Pennsylvania saw real partisan competition; a Federalist electoral slate pledged to Washington and Adams was selected, although one elector voted for Washington and Clinton. At the time, party organizations were still in their infancy, and the partisan allegiance of the candidates was not always evident: it is therefore difficult to say whether the Pennsylvania vote for Clinton was an instance of a faithless elector, or an elector voting as pledged.

=== Electoral vote ===
Presidential candidate	Party	Home state	Popular vote^{(a)}		Electoral vote^{(b)}
Presidential candidate	Party	Home state	Count	Percentage	Electoral vote^{(b)}
George Washington (incumbent)	Independent	Virginia	11,176	100%	132
John Adams	Federalist	Massachusetts	—	—	77
George Clinton	Democratic-Republican	New York	—	—	50
Thomas Jefferson	Democratic-Republican	Virginia	—	—	4
Aaron Burr	Democratic-Republican	New York	—	—	1
Total			11,176	100.0%	132
Needed to win					67

^{(a)} Only 6 of the 15 states chose electors by any form of popular vote, while pre-Twelfth Amendment electoral vote rules obscure the intentions of the voters, and those states that did choose electors by popular vote restricted the vote via property requirements.
^{(b)} Two electors from Maryland and one elector from Vermont did not cast votes.

=== Popular vote ===
Slate	Popular Vote^{(a), (b), (c), (d)}	
Slate	Count	Percentage
Federalist	6,818	87.6%
Democratic-Republican	962	12.4%
Total	7,780	100%

Source (Popular Vote): A New Nation Votes: American Election Returns 1787-1825

^{(a)} Only 6 of the 15 states chose electors by any form of popular vote.
^{(b)} Pre-Twelfth Amendment electoral vote rules obscure the intentions of the voters
^{(c)} Those states that did choose electors by popular vote had widely varying restrictions on suffrage via property requirements.
^{(d)} Returns for several states are incomplete.

=== Popular vote by state ===
Elections in this period were vastly different from modern day presidential elections. The actual presidential candidates were rarely mentioned on tickets and voters were voting for particular electors who were pledged to a particular candidate. There was sometimes confusion as to who the particular elector was actually pledged to. Results are reported as the highest result for an elector for any given faction. For example, if three Federalist electors received 100, 50, and 25 votes, Federalist electors would be recorded as having 100 votes. Confusion surrounding the way results are reported may lead to discrepancies between the sum of all state results and national results.

In Massachusetts, the best performing elector candidate for the Eastern District, Thomas Rice, was not selected by the Massachusetts General Court to be an elector. Rice was a Federalist and his returns have been included into the state total below instead of the second best performing elector candidate.

The totals for Kentucky, Pennsylvania, and Virginia appear to be incomplete. In several states candidates of unknown affiliation received votes.

		George Washington Federalist			George Washington Democratic-Republican			Margin		Not cast	Citation
State	Electoral votes	#	%	Electoral votes	#	%	Electoral votes	#	%		
Connecticut	9	No popular vote		9	No popular vote		-	-		-	-
Delaware	3	No popular vote		3	No popular vote		-	-		-	-
Georgia	4	No popular vote		4	No popular vote		-	-		-	-
Kentucky	4	No data		-	No data		4	-		-	
Maryland	8 (10)	898	100	8	No data		-	898	100	2	
Massachusetts	16	4,138	100	16	No ballots		-	4,138	100	-	
New Hampshire	6	1,782	100	6	No ballots		-	1,782	100	-	
New Jersey	7	No popular vote		7	No popular vote		-	-		-	-
New York	12	No popular vote		-	No popular vote		12	-		-	-
North Carolina	12	No popular vote		-	No popular vote		12	-		-	-
Pennsylvania	15	The two best performing electors were supported by both groups (Note: The two best performing electors in Pennsylvania, Joseph Hiester and William Henry, were supported by both groups. They received 3,396 and 3,371 votes respectively. It is not known which one voted for Clinton. The total for Washington only includes the 3,396 number as to not represent Pennsylvanian voters twice in popular vote figures.)						-		-	
Rhode Island	4	No popular vote		4	No popular vote		-	-		-	-
South Carolina	8	No popular vote		7	No popular vote		1	-		-	-
Vermont	3 (4)	No popular vote		3	No popular vote		-	-		1	-
Virginia	21	No data		-	962		21	-		-	
TOTALS:	135	6,818	96.16	67	962	3.84	50	26,385	92.32	3	
TO WIN:	68										

=== Electoral votes by state ===
The states chose 135 electors, out of whom 132 cast ballots. (Two electors from Maryland and one from Vermont were absent and did not vote.) As per the terms of the unamended constitution, each elector was permitted two votes for president, with a majority of "the whole number of electors appointed" necessary to elect a president. Each of the participating electors cast one vote for Washington, who was elected president. The electors were split on their second choice: Adams received 77 votes to Clinton's 50, enough to secure a second-place finish behind Washington and the vice presidency.

State	Electors	Electoral votes	GW	JA	GC	TJ	AB	Blank
Connecticut	9	18	9	9	—	—	—	—
Delaware	3	6	3	3	—	—	—	—
Georgia	4	8	4	—	4	—	—	—
Kentucky	4	8	4	—	—	4	—	—
Maryland	10	20	8	8	—	—	—	4
Massachusetts	16	32	16	16	—	—	—	—
New Hampshire	6	12	6	6	—	—	—	—
New Jersey	7	14	7	7	—	—	—	—
New York	12	24	12	—	12	—	—	—
North Carolina	12	24	12	—	12	—	—	—
Pennsylvania	15	30	15	14	1	—	—	—
Rhode Island	4	8	4	4	—	—	—	—
South Carolina	8	16	8	7	—	—	1	—
Vermont	4	8	3	3	—	—	—	2
Virginia	21	42	21	—	21	—	—	—
TOTAL	135	270	132	77	50	4	1	6
TO WIN	67	67						

Source: A New Nation Votes: American Election Returns 1787-1825

Popular vote
Washington	100%
Others	0.0%

Electoral vote (Note: Electors voted for two candidates; percentages are calculated as a share of the total number of electors.)
Washington	100%
Adams	58.3%
Clinton	37.9%
Jefferson	3.0%
Burr	0.8%

=== Maps ===
Electoral College result (first vote)

Electoral College result (second vote)

Popular vote by state

Map of presidential election results by county, shaded according to the vote share of the highest result for an elector of any given party

Map of presidential election results by electoral district, shaded according to the vote share of the highest result for an elector of any given party. Electoral boundaries for Kentucky, North Carolina, and data for Massachusetts could not be found

== Electoral college selection ==
The Constitution, in Article II, Section 1, provided that the state legislatures should decide the manner in which their Electors were chosen. Different state legislatures chose different methods:

Method of choosing electors	State(s)
state is divided into electoral districts, with one elector chosen per district by the voters of that district	Kentucky; Virginia
each elector chosen by voters statewide	Maryland; Pennsylvania
two congressional districts chose five electors each; the remaining two districts chose three electors; each elector chosen by majority vote of voters in congressional district; if an insufficient number of electors are chosen by majority vote from a congressional district, remaining electors would be appointed by the state legislature	Massachusetts
each elector chosen by majority vote of voters statewide; if an insufficient number of electors are chosen by majority vote, runoff is held between the top 2n vote-getters, where n is the number of vacancies remaining	New Hampshire
each elector appointed by the state legislature	Connecticut; Delaware; Georgia; New Jersey; New York; North Carolina; Rhode Island; South Carolina; Vermont

== See also ==
- First Party System
- History of the United States (1789–1849)
- Presidency of George Washington
- 1792–93 United States House of Representatives elections
- 1792–93 United States Senate elections
- List of 1792 United States presidential electors
- List of George Washington articles

== Bibliography ==
- Berg-Andersson, Richard (September 17, 2000). "A Historical Analysis of the Electoral College". The Green Papers.
- Elkins, Stanley; McKitrick, Eric (1995). The Age of Federalism. Oxford University Press.
- A New Nation Votes: American Election Returns, 1787-1825
