= 1792 United States presidential election in New Jersey =

- November 2 – December 5, 1792
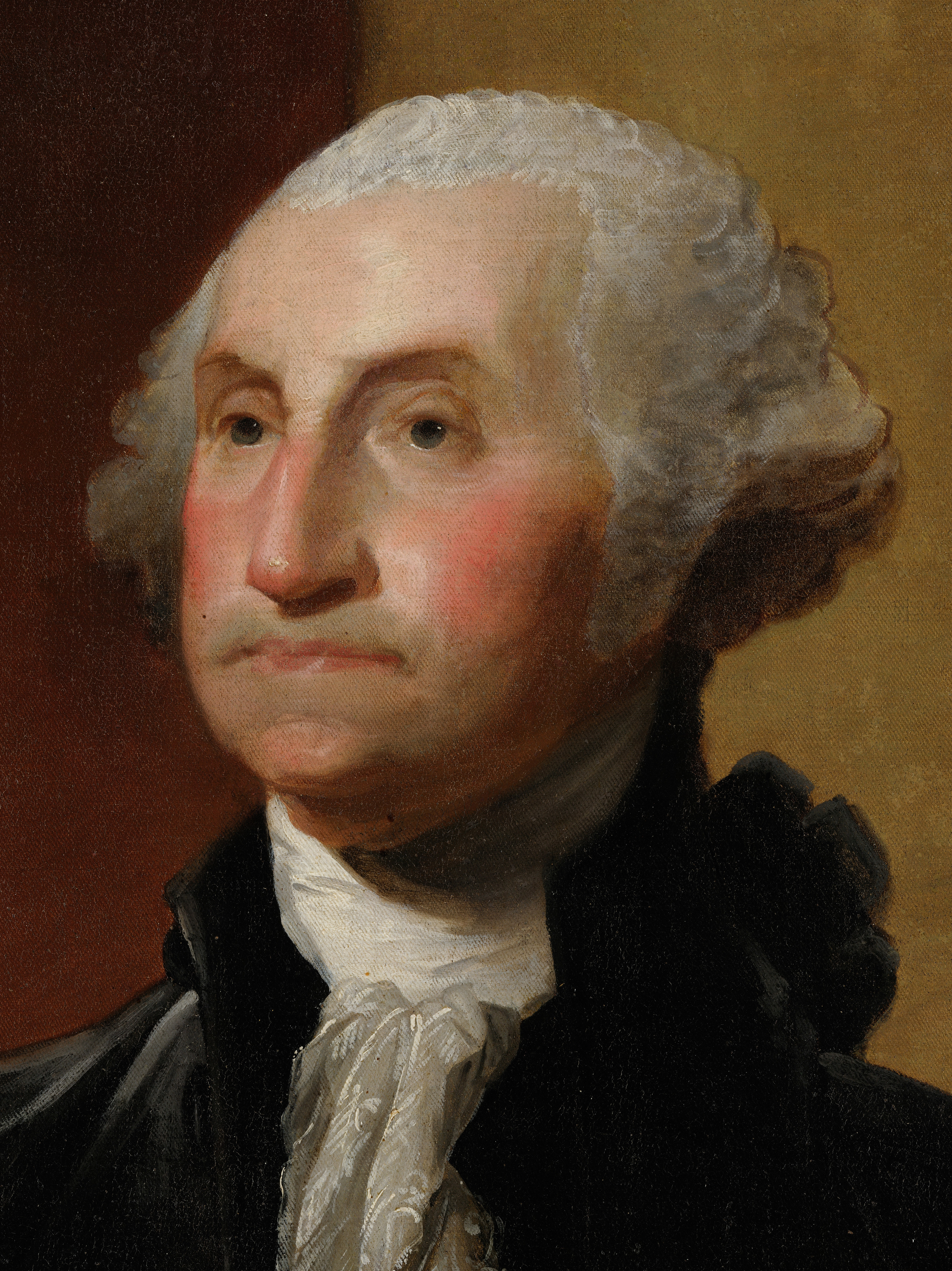

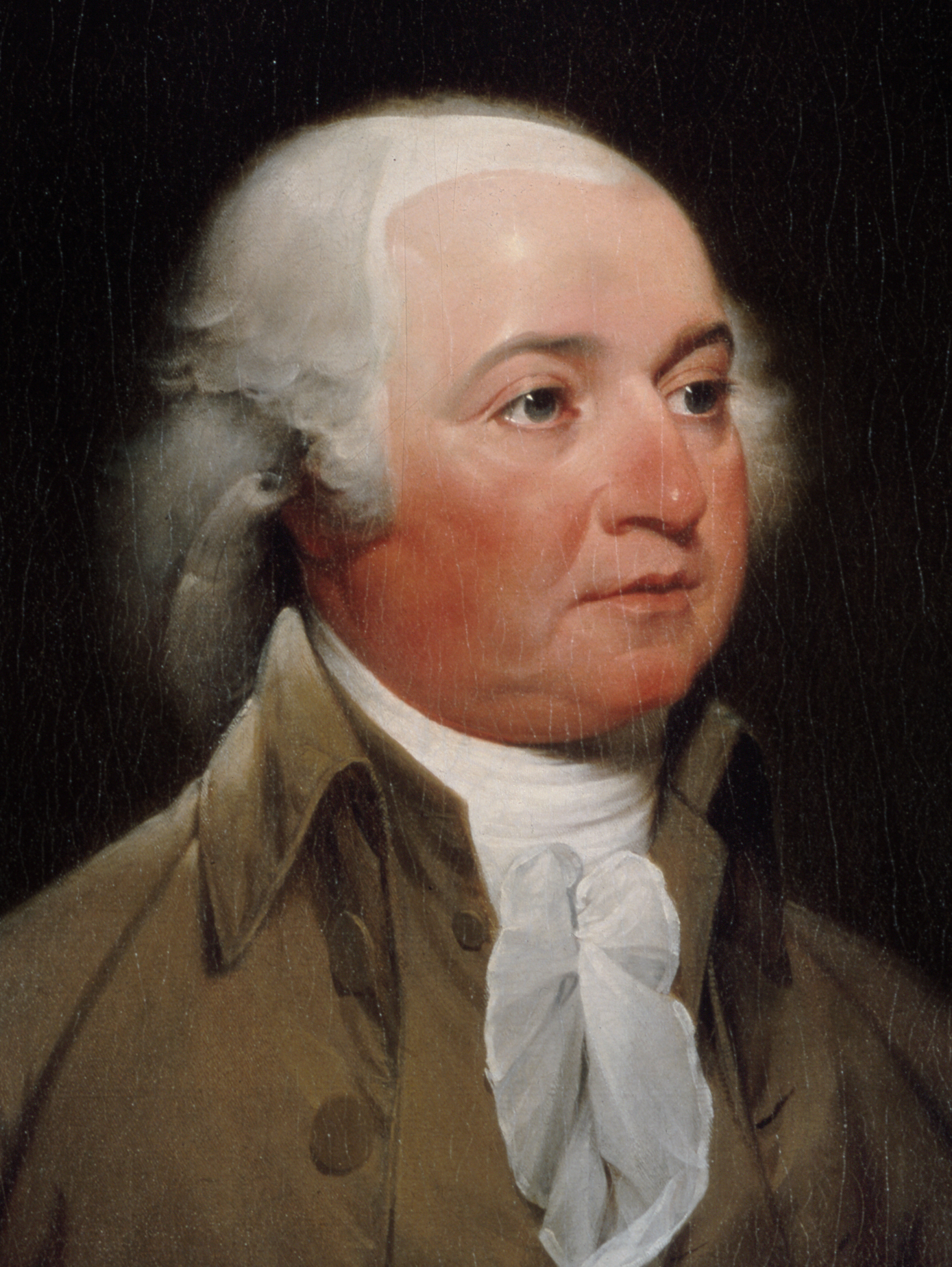
Nominee	George Washington	John Adams
Party	Independent	Federalist
Home state	Virginia	Massachusetts
Electoral vote	7	7
Percentage	100.00%	–
President before election
George Washington
Independent
Elected President
George Washington
Independent

A presidential election was held in New Jersey between November 2 and December 5, 1792, as part of the 1792 United States presidential election. The state legislature chose seven members of the Electoral College, each of whom, under the provisions of the Constitution prior to the passage of the Twelfth Amendment, cast two votes for President.

New Jersey's seven electors each cast one vote for incumbent George Washington and one vote for incumbent Vice President John Adams.

== See also ==
- United States presidential elections in New Jersey
