= 1792 United States presidential election in Kentucky =

- November 2 – December 5, 1792
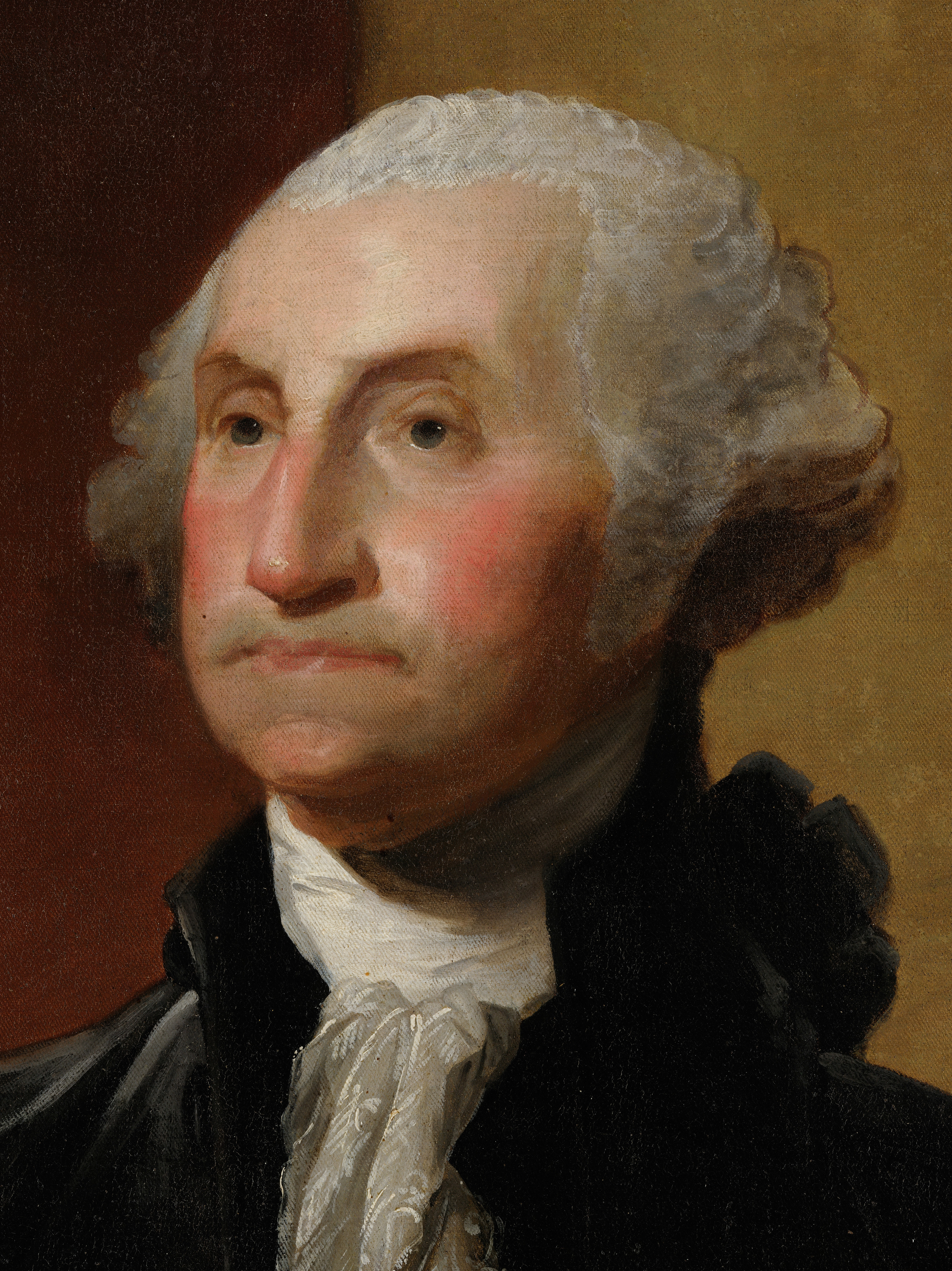

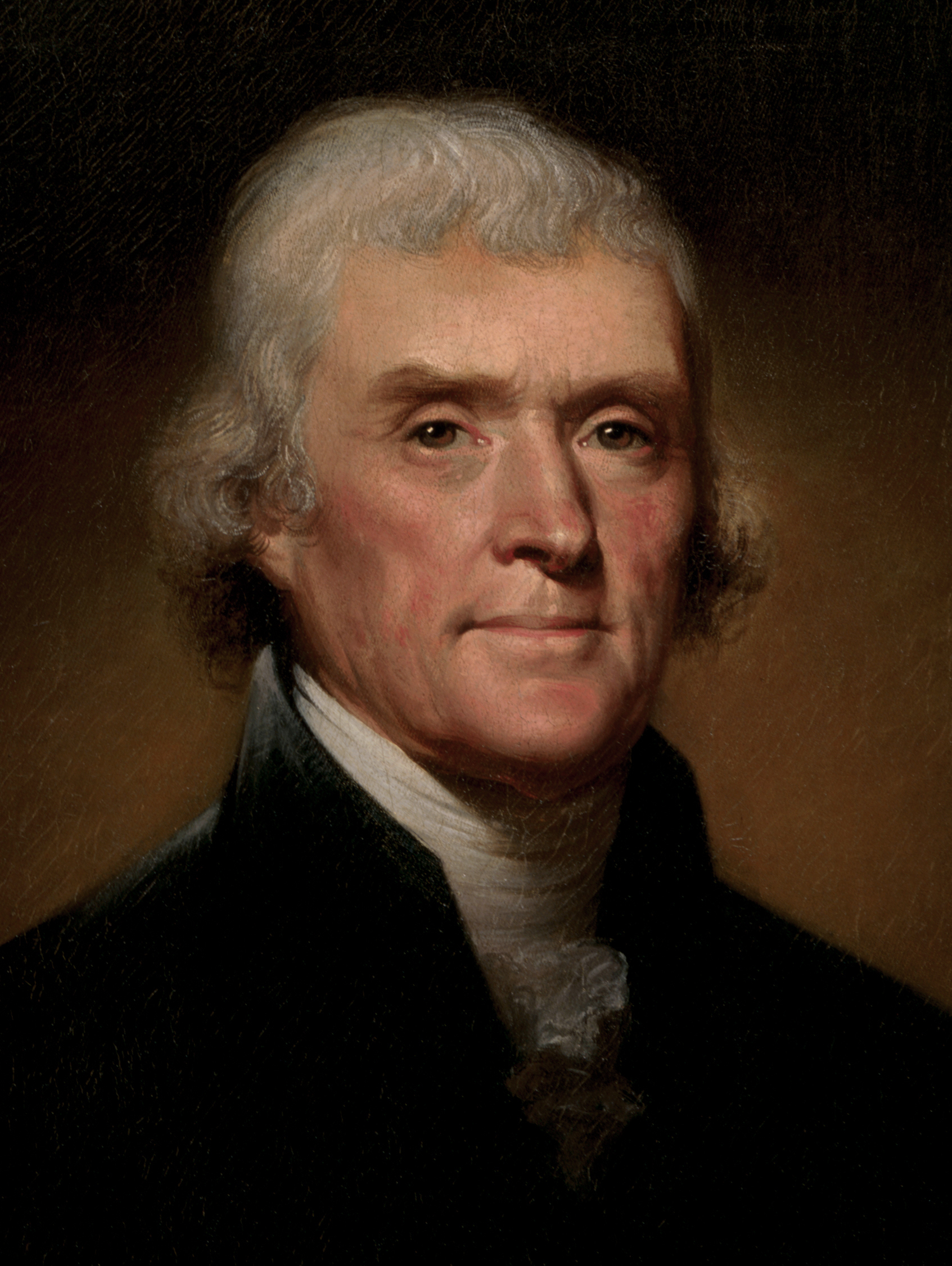
Nominee	George Washington	Thomas Jefferson
Party	Independent	Democratic-Republican
Home state	Virginia	Virginia
Electoral vote	4	4

A presidential election was held in Kentucky between November 2 and December 5, 1792, as part of the 1792 United States presidential election. The voters chose four representatives, or electors to the Electoral College, who voted for President and Vice President. It was the first presidential election Kentucky participated in since being admitted to the Union on June 1, 1792.

Kentucky cast four electoral votes for the Independent candidate and incumbent President George Washington, as he ran effectively unopposed. The electoral votes for Vice president were cast for Democratic-Republican Thomas Jefferson from Virginia, the only state to do so. The state was divided into four electoral districts with one elector each, whereupon each district's voters chose the electors.

== Results ==
1792 United States presidential election in Kentucky
Party	Candidate	Electoral vote	%
Independent	George Washington	4	100.00%
Total votes		4	100.00%

=== Results by elector ===
1792 United States presidential election in Kentucky
Party	Candidate	Vice presidential vote
Democratic-Republican	Benjamin Logan	Thomas Jefferson
Democratic-Republican	Charles Scott	Thomas Jefferson
Democratic-Republican	Notley Conn	Thomas Jefferson
Democratic-Republican	Richard C. Anderson Sr.	Thomas Jefferson

== See also ==
- United States presidential elections in Kentucky
