= 1792 United States presidential election in New Hampshire =

- November 2 – December 5, 1792
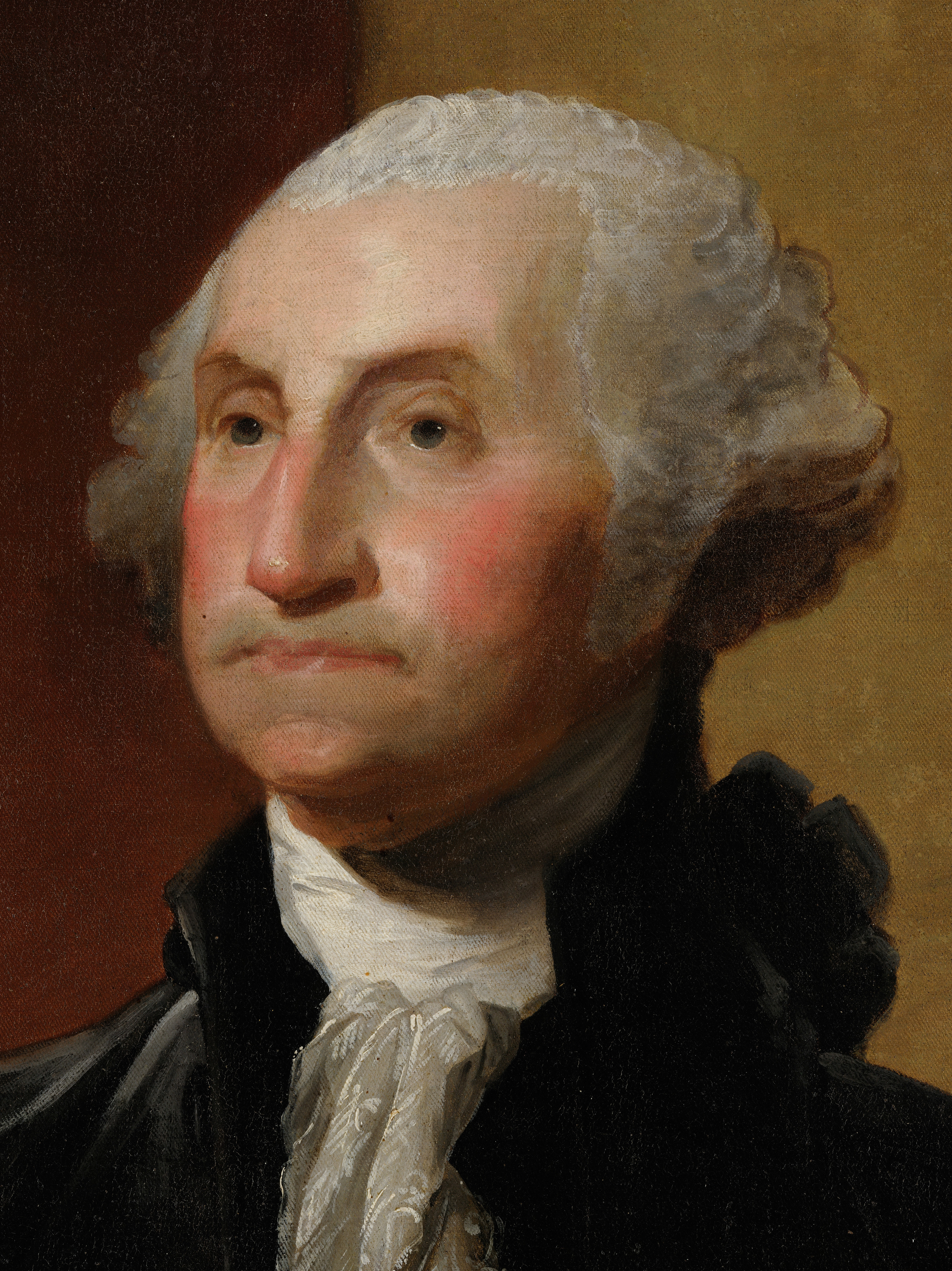

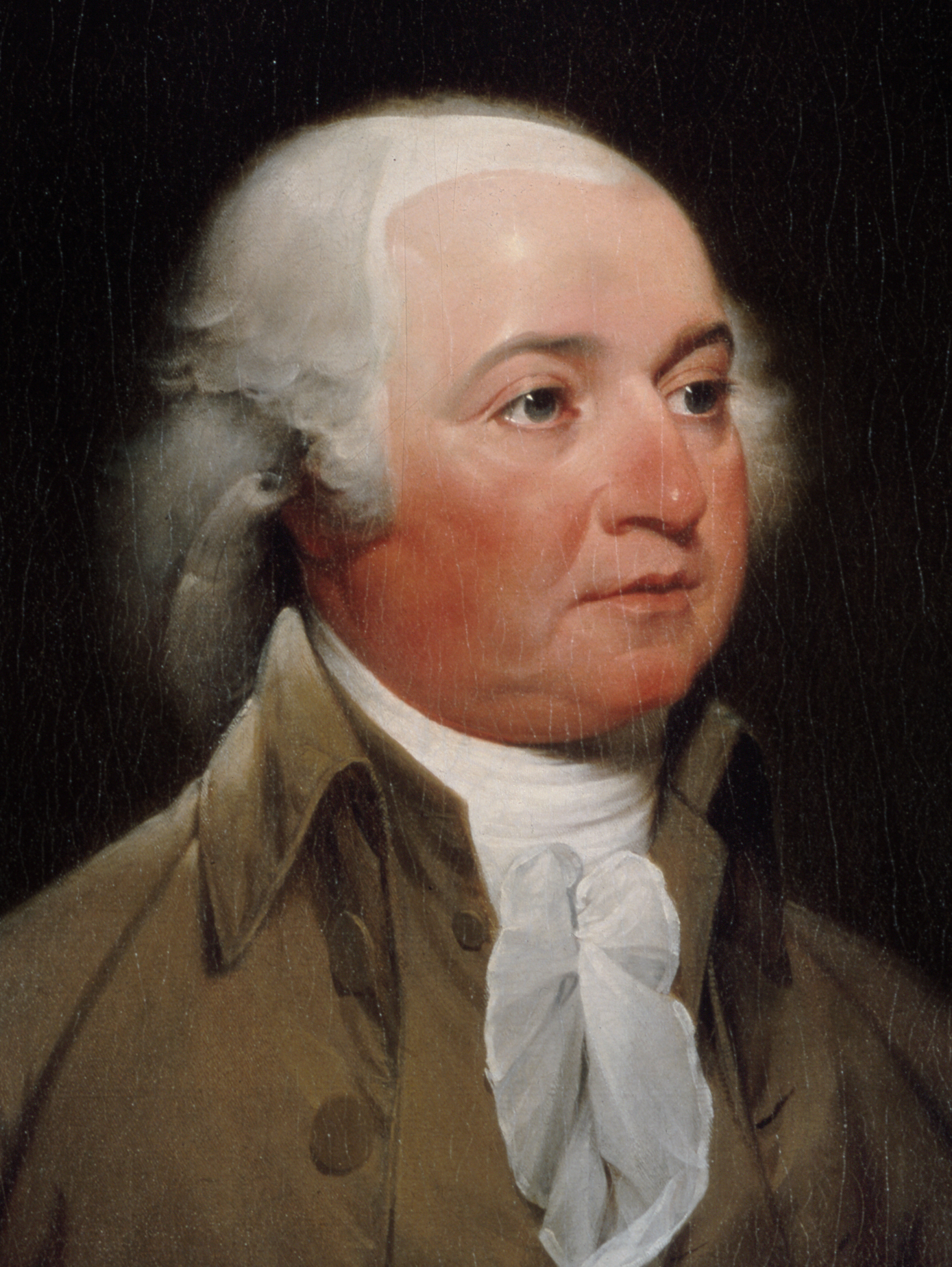
Nominee	George Washington	John Adams
Party	Independent	Federalist
Home state	Virginia	Massachusetts
Electoral vote	6	6
Popular vote	1,782
Percentage	100.00%
President before election
George Washington
Independent
Elected President
George Washington
Independent

A presidential election was held in New Hampshire between November 2 to December 5, 1792, as part of the 1792 United States presidential election to elect the president. Voters chose five representatives, or electors, to the Electoral College, who voted for President and Vice President.

New Hampshire voted for incumbent George Washington without any competitor.

== Results by presidential candidates ==
1792 United States presidential election in New Hampshire
Party	Candidate	Votes	%
Independent	George Washington	1,782	100.00%
Total votes		1,782	100.00%

=== Results by county ===
1792 United States presidential election in New Hampshire
County	George Washington Independent		Margin		Total (Note: Results for George Washington are taken from the highest voted elector with either a formal ticket pledge, or a submitted electoral vote, for each township, where applicable.) (Note: Important. These partial county results are not indicative of the final result. Full county results are said to be lost or missing for this election.)
County	#	%	#	%	Total
Cheshire	52	100.00%	52	100.00%	52
Grafton	90	100.00%	90	100.00%	90
Hillsborough	61	100.00%	61	100.00%	61
Rockingham	260	100.00%	260	100.00%	260
Strafford	102	100.00%	102	100.00%	102
Total	565	100.00%	565	100.00%	565

=== Results by district ===
1792 United States presidential election in New Hampshire
District	E.V.	George Washington Independent			Margin		Total (Note: Results for George Washington are taken from the highest voted elector with either a formal ticket pledge, or a submitted electoral vote, for each township, where applicable.)
District	E.V.	#	%	E.V.	#	%	Total
At-large	6	1,782	100.00%	6	1,782	100.00%	1,782
Total	6	1,782	100.00%	6	1,782	100.00%	1,782

== Results by presidential electors ==
1792 United States presidential election in New Hampshire
Party	Candidate	Votes	%
Federalist	Federalist electors	1,782	78.09%
Democratic-Republican	Democratic-Republican electors	500	21.91%
Total votes		2,282	100.00%

=== Results by county ===
1792 United States presidential election in New Hampshire
County	Federalist electors		Democratic-Republican electors		Margin		Total (Note: Aggregrated by highest voted elector per township.) (Note: Important. These partial county results are not indicative of the final result. Full county results are said to be lost or missing for this election.)
County	#	%	#	%	#	%	Total
Cheshire	52	100.00%	0	0.00%	52	100.00%	52
Grafton	90	46.15%	105	53.85%	-15	-7.70%	195
Hillsborough	70	55.12%	57	44.88%	13	10.24%	127
Rockingham	260	55.32%	210	44.68%	50	10.64%	470
Strafford	102	44.35%	128	55.65%	-26	-11.30%	230
Total	574	53.45%	500	46.55%	74	6.90%	1,074

==== Results by county swing ====
Swing compared to the 1788-89 election
County	Party		Status
County	Federalist	Democratic-Republican / Anti-Federalist (Note: Partial swing data only compares Democratic-Republican performance to previous Anti-Federalist performance. The Democratic-Republican party is considered to be the direct evolution of the Anti-Federalist coalition.)	Status
County	± pp	± pp	Status
Cheshire	▲40.00 pp	▼40.00 pp	Gain
Grafton	▼44.42 pp	▲44.42 pp	Flip
Hillsborough	▼10.85 pp	▲10.85 pp	Loss
Rockingham	▼39.16 pp	▲39.16 pp	Loss
Strafford	▼4.22 pp	▲4.22 pp	Gain
Total	▼24.85 pp	▲24.85 pp	Loss

=== Results by district ===
1792 United States presidential election in New Hampshire
District	E.V.	Federalist electors			Democratic-Republican electors			Margin		Total (Note: Aggregrated by highest voted elector per township where applicable.) (Note: Due to missing county results data, the highest performing federalist candidate of the at-large district is represented instead.)
District	E.V.	#	%	E.V.	#	%	E.V.	#	%	Total
At-large	6	1,782	78.09%	6	500	21.91%	0	1,282	56.18%	2,282
Total	6	1,782	78.09%	6	500	21.91%	0	1,282	56.18%	2,282

=== Results by elector ===
1792 United States presidential election in New Hampshire
Party	Candidate	Votes	%
Federalist	Josiah Bartlett (Note: Federalist elector for this election.)	1,782	6.98%
Federalist	John T. Gilman	1,754	6.87%
Federalist	Jonathan Freeman	1,607	6.29%
Federalist	Benjamin Bellows	1,489	5.83%
Federalist	John Pickering	1,298	5.08%
Federalist	Ebenezer Thompson	994	3.89%
Federalist	Timothy Farrar	980	3.84%
Unknown	Ebenezer Smith	678	2.66%
Unknown	Daniel Rindge	437	1.71%
Democratic-Republican	Joseph Cilley (Note: A staunch anti-federalist who endorsed Thomas Jefferson over Alexander Hamilton as parties first began to evolve under Washington's second term. A republican partisan during the 1790s who supported Thomas Jefferson in politics.)	376	1.47%
Democratic-Republican	Thomas Cogswell (Note: A prominent anti-federalist who transitioned into a republican in national politics during the 1790s. Democratic-Republican candidate for the New Hampshire House of Representatives in 1796. No documented political/oppositional shift noted during the 1790s.)	324	1.27%
Democratic-Republican	Timothy Walker (Note: A republican partisan in politics during the 1790s.)	235	0.92%
Unknown	John Dudley	190	0.74%
Unknown	Daniel Warner	146	0.57%
Democratic-Republican	Joseph Badger (Note: Democratic-Republican partisan in politics.)	133	0.52%
Unknown	Christopher Toppan	129	0.51%
Unknown	William Page	82	0.32%
Unknown	William Simpson	72	0.28%
Unknown	Jonathan Warner	62	0.24%
Federalist	Abiel Foster	57	0.22%
Unknown	John White	56	0.22%
Unknown	Charles Barrett	55	0.22%
Unknown	John McDuffee	53	0.21%
Unknown	Elisha Payne	51	0.20%
Federalist	Ebenezer Webster (Note: Federalist partison who supported the new federal constitution, and later supported Alexander Hamilton over Thomas Jefferson during Washington's administration.)	44	0.17%
Unknown	John Bellows	41	0.16%
Unknown	James Flanders	28	0.11%
Unknown	Jonathan Gove	28	0.11%
Unknown	Moses Dow	28	0.11%
Unknown	T. Badger	28	0.11%
Unknown	Joshua Colby	23	0.09%
Unknown	Robert Wallace	21	0.08%
Unknown	Phillips White	19	0.07%
Unknown	James Freeman	16	0.06%
Unknown	Joseph Pearson	16	0.06%
Federalist	Nicholas Gilman (Note: Pro-Administration and federalist candidate for the 2nd United States Congress (1791-1793), and the 3rd United States Congress (1793-1795).)	16	0.06%
Unknown	Sanford Kingsbery	16	0.06%
Federalist	James Sheafe	11	0.04%
Democratic-Republican	John S. Sherburne (Note: Anti-Administration candidate for the 3rd United States Congress (1793-1795), and Democratic-Republican candidate for the 4th United States Congress (1975-1977).)	11	0.04%
Unknown	Samuel Dana	11	0.04%
Federalist	Joshua Atherton (Note: Federalist partisan during the 1790s.)	9	0.04%
Unknown	Wallis	9	0.04%
Unknown	Lemuel Holmes	8	0.03%
Federalist	Nathaniel Peabody (Note: Federalist partisan in politics during the early-mid 1790s. Federalist candidate for the 2nd United States Congress (1791-1793), and for the 3rd United States Congress (1795-1795).)	8	0.03%
Unknown	Bezaleel Woodward	7	0.03%
Unknown	John Peirce	3	0.01%
Unknown	George Reid	2	0.01%
Unknown	John Prentice	2	0.01%
Unknown	Reuben Hill	2	0.01%
Unknown	Amos Shephard	1	0.00%
Unknown	Daniel Briggs	-	0.00%
Unknown	Daniel Warren	-	0.00%
Unknown	Scattering	12,087	47.34%
Total votes		25,535	100.00%

== See also ==
- United States presidential elections in New Hampshire
