= 1792 United States presidential election in Georgia =

- November 2 – December 5, 1792
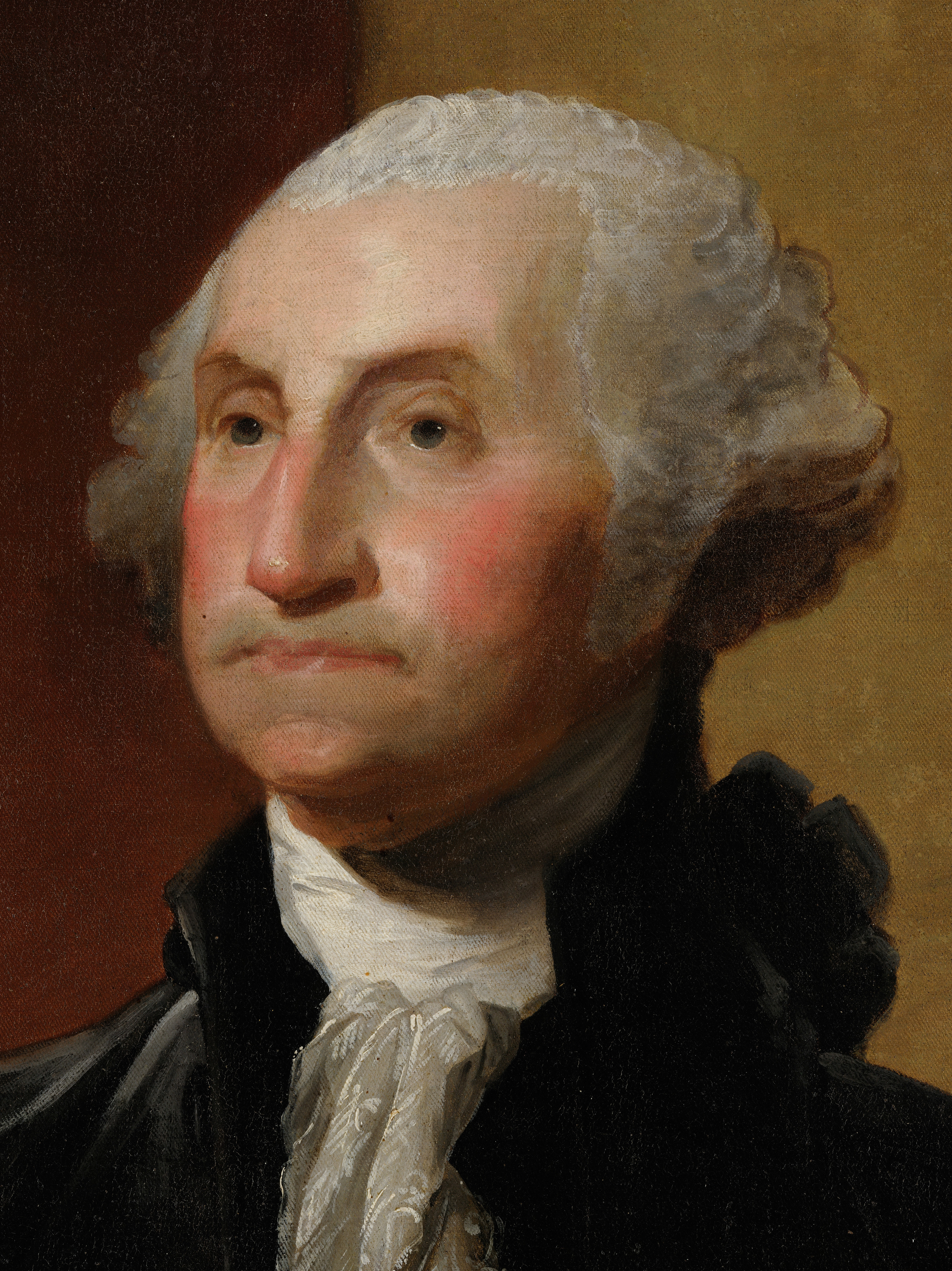

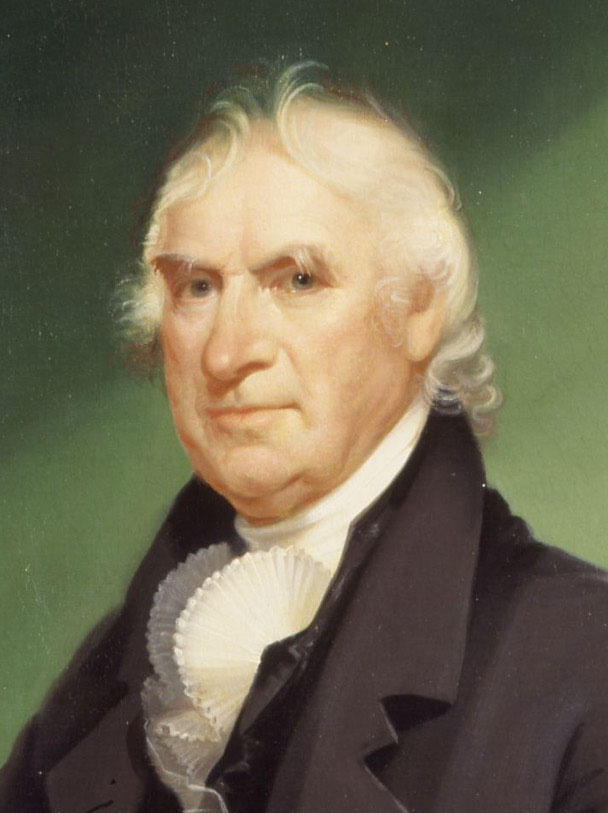
Nominee	George Washington	George Clinton
Party	Independent	Democratic-Republican
Home state	Virginia	New York
Electoral vote	4	4

A presidential election was held in Georgia between November 2 and December 5, 1792, as part of the 1792 United States presidential election. The state legislature chose four representatives, or electors to the Electoral College, who voted for President and Vice President. Georgia had lost one elector compared to the previous election in 1788–89.

Georgia cast four electoral votes for the Independent candidate and incumbent President George Washington, as he ran effectively unopposed. The electoral votes for Vice president were cast for Democratic-Republican George Clinton from New York. These electors were elected by the Georgia General Assembly, the state legislature, rather than by popular vote.

== Results ==
1792 United States presidential election in Georgia
Party	Candidate	Electoral vote	%
Independent	George Washington	4	100.00%
Total votes		4	100.00%

=== Results by elector ===
1792 United States presidential election in Georgia
Party	Candidate	Vice presidential vote
Democratic-Republican	Benjamin Taliaferro	George Clinton
Democratic-Republican	John King	George Clinton
Democratic-Republican	Seaborn Jones	George Clinton
Democratic-Republican	William Gibbons	George Clinton

== See also ==
- United States presidential elections in Georgia
