= 1792 United States presidential election in South Carolina =

- November 2 – December 5, 1792
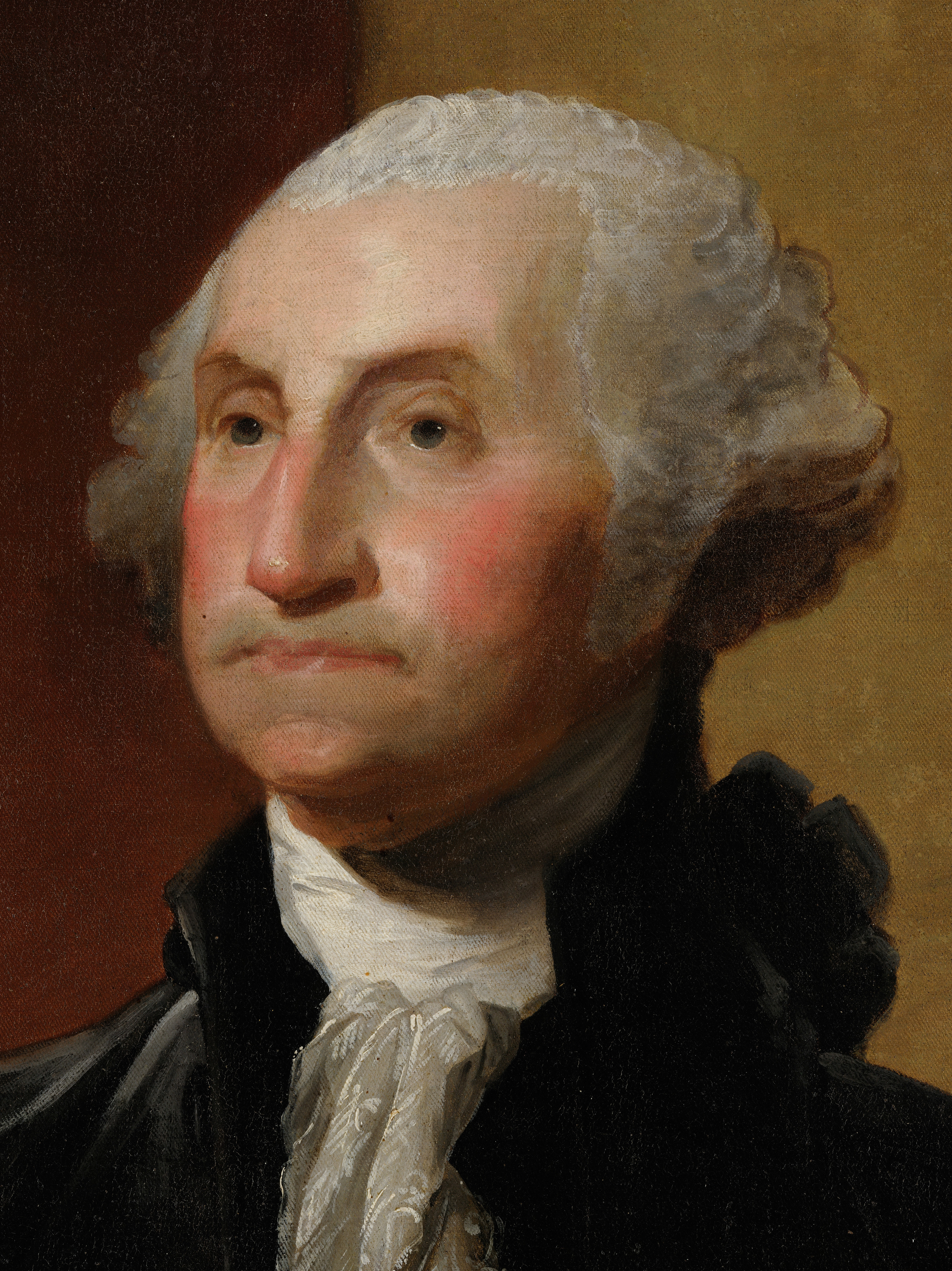

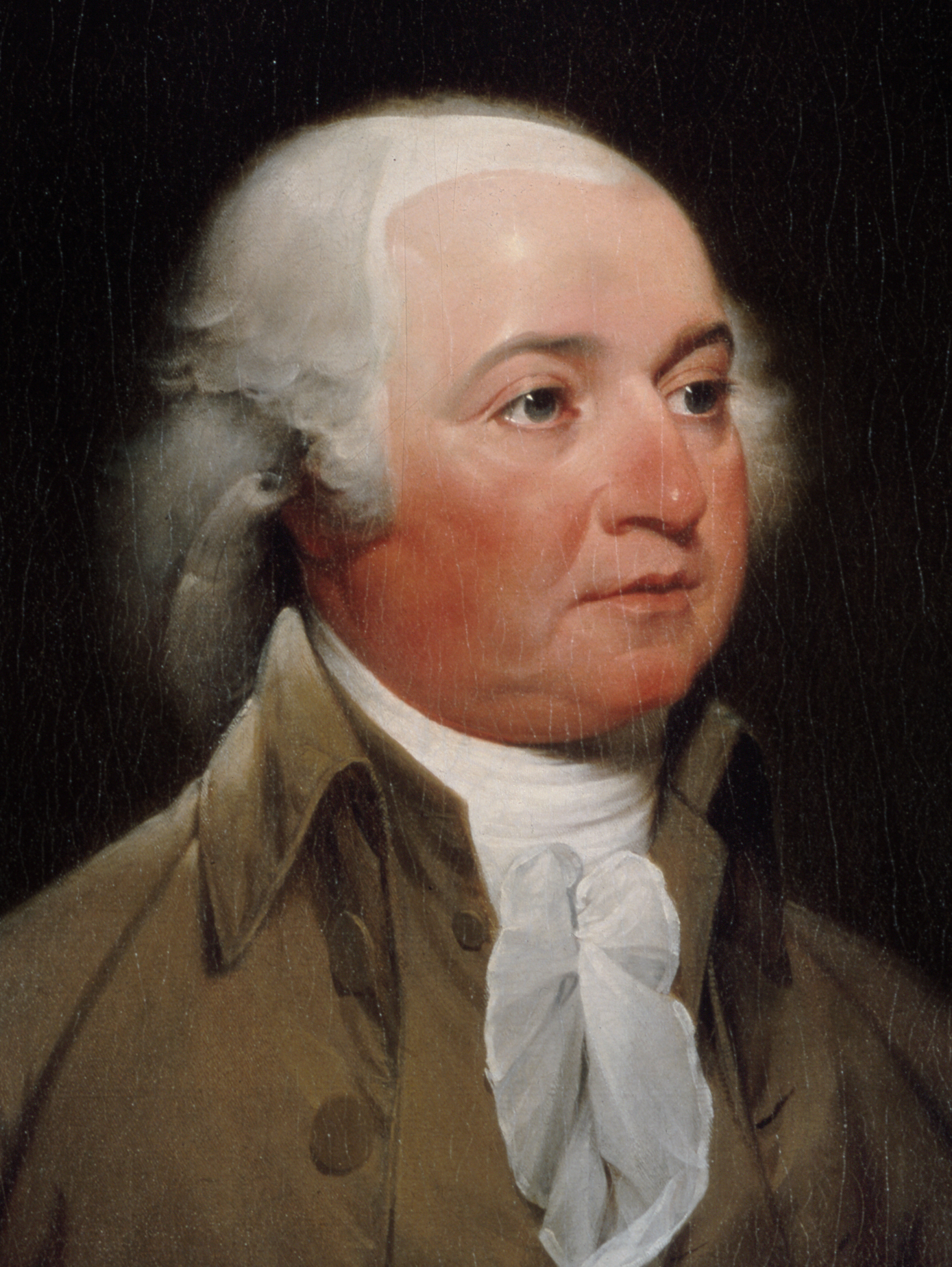

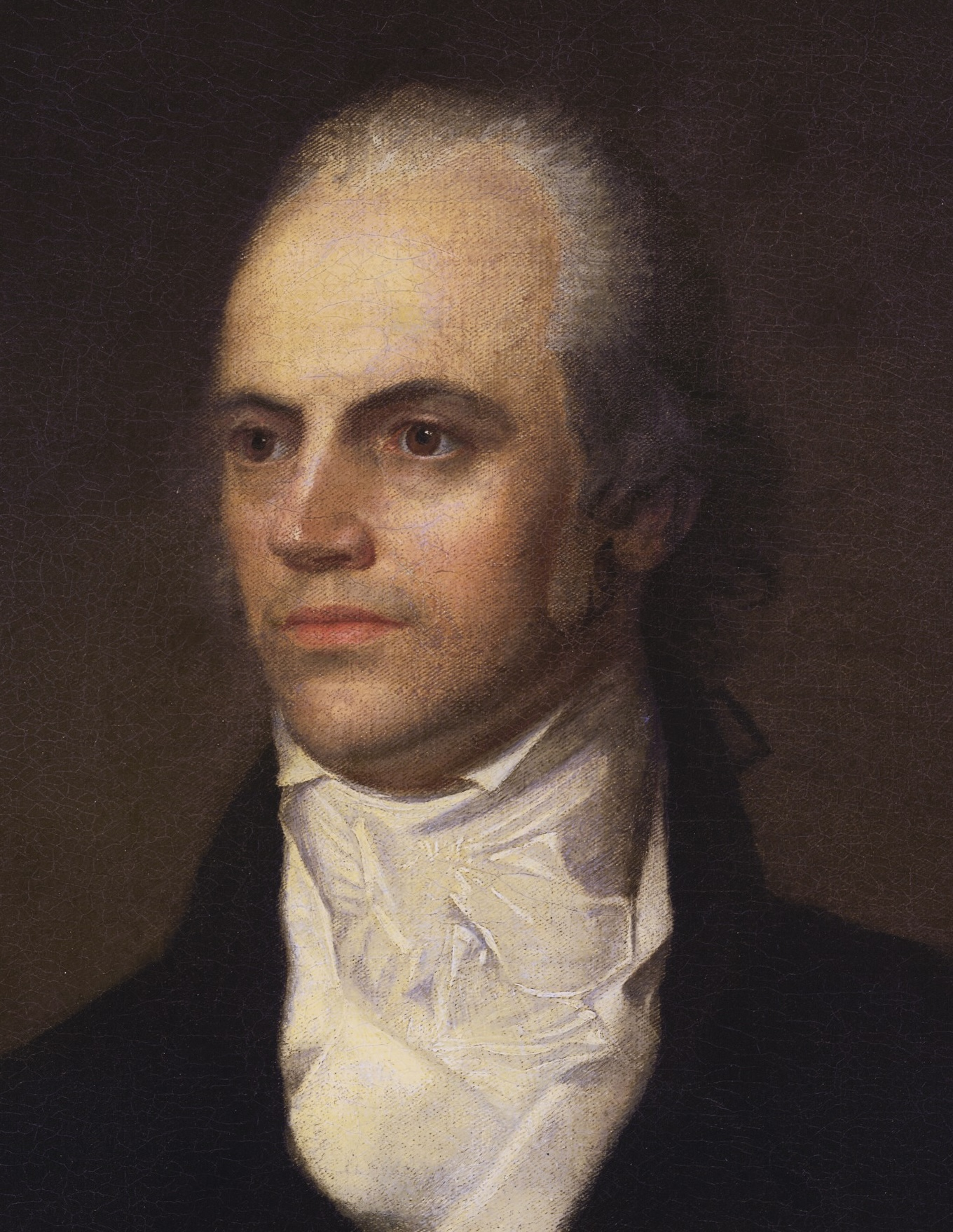
Nominee	George Washington	John Adams	Aaron Burr
Party	Independent	Federalist	Democratic-Republican
Home state	Virginia	Massachusetts	New York
Electoral vote	8	7	1
Percentage	100.00%	–	–
President before election
George Washington
Independent
Elected President
George Washington
Independent

A presidential election was held in South Carolina between November 2 and December 5, 1792, as part of the 1792 United States presidential election. The state legislature chose eight members of the Electoral College, each of whom, under the provisions of the Constitution prior to the passage of the Twelfth Amendment, cast two votes for President.

South Carolina's eight electors each cast one vote for the incumbent, George Washington; with one exception, each of those electors cast a second vote for Vice President John Adams, the outlier voting for Aaron Burr.

The Federalist Party dominated South Carolina in the 1790s as it could count a number of prominent lowcountry planters among their ranks. Many South Carolinians played important roles for the Federalist Party at the national level. The Jeffersonian-Republicans, however, were rising in prominence, especially as Charles Cotesworth Pinckney and Pierce Butler, both of whom signed the Constitution for South Carolina, joined the rival party. Although the Federalists dominated the state until 1800, by 1804 there were no Federalists in power. South Carolina would remain a one-party state until the start of the Civil War.
