= 1792 United States presidential election in Delaware =

- November 2 – December 5, 1792
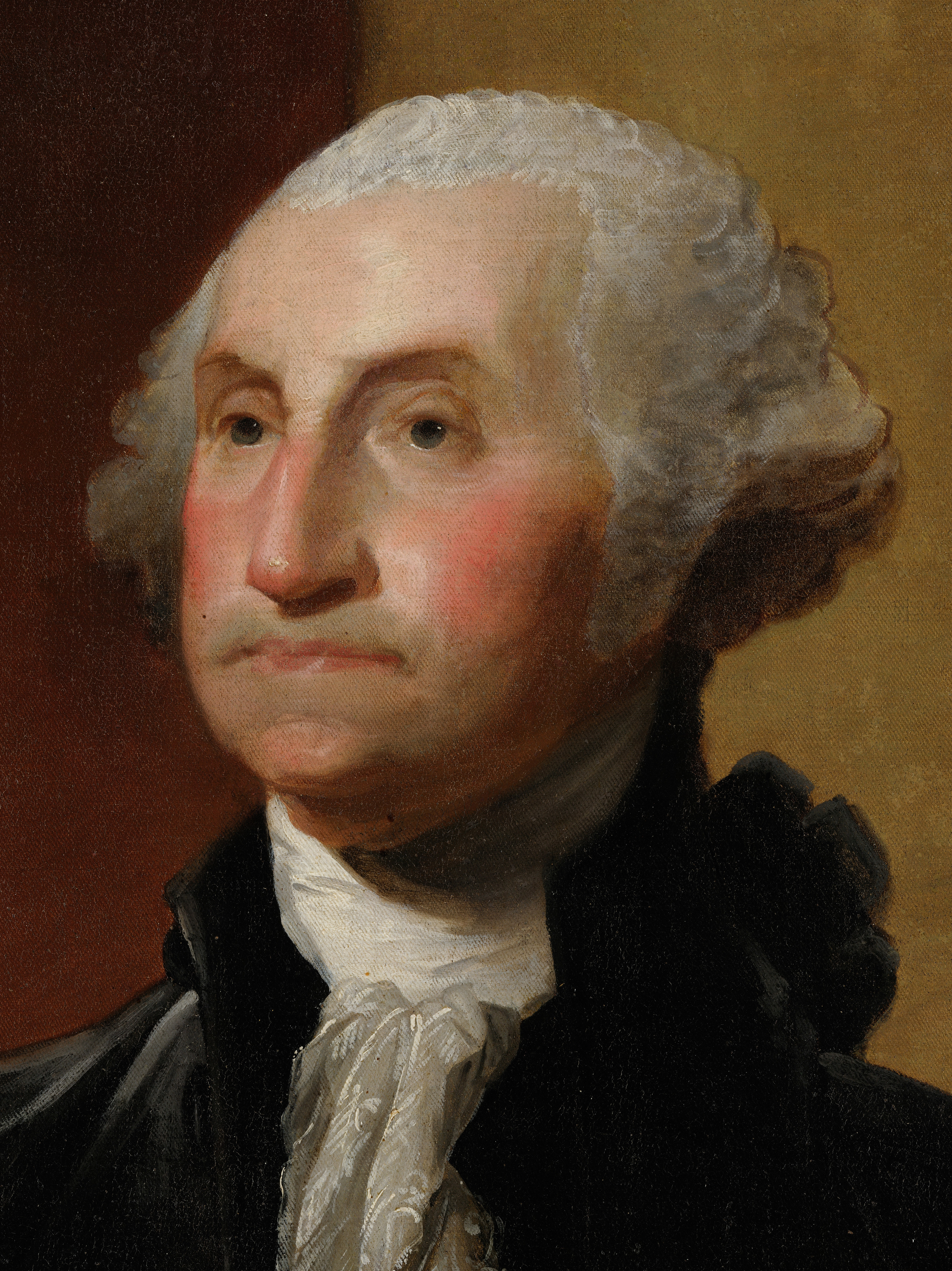

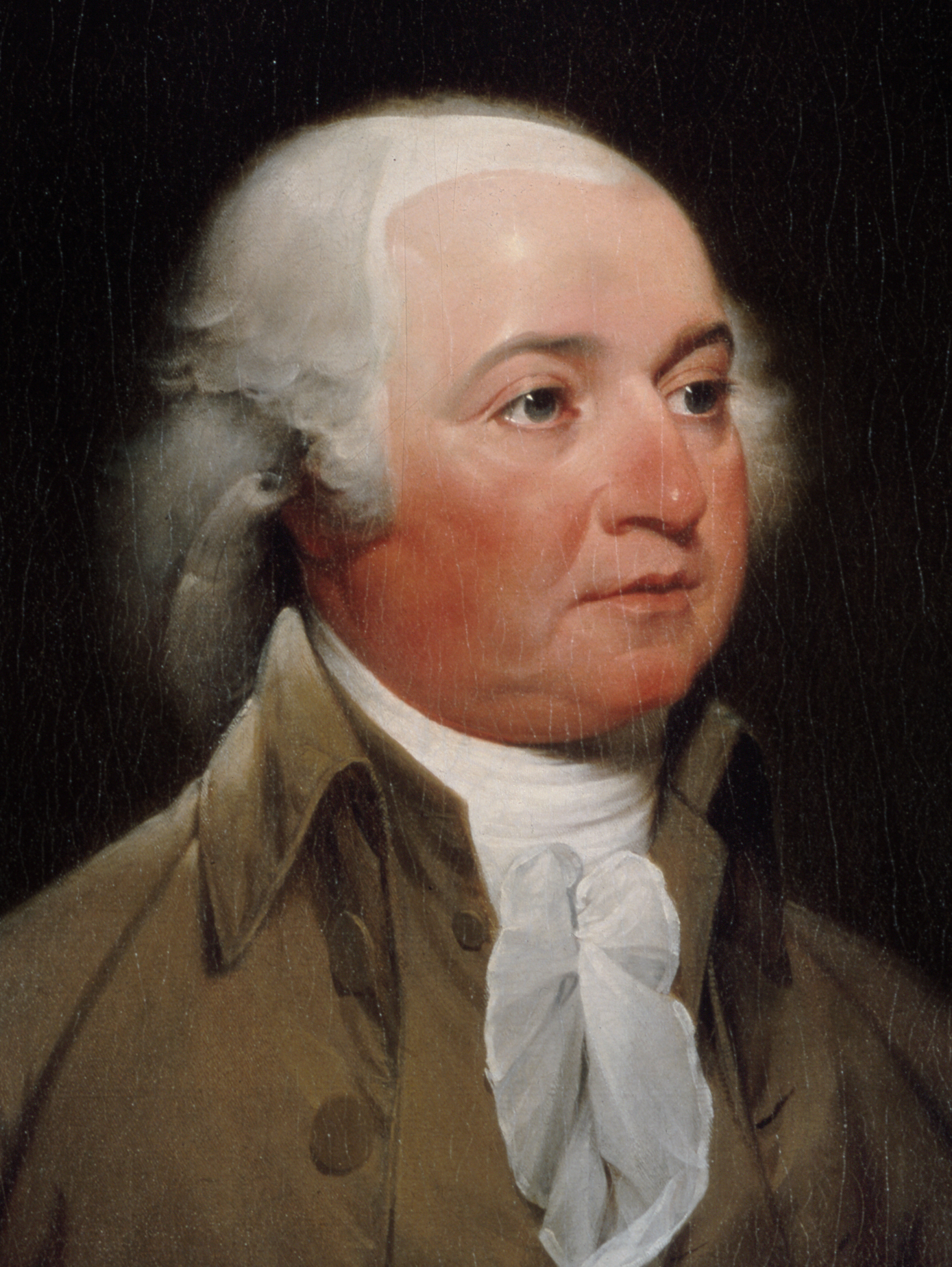
Nominee	George Washington	John Adams
Party	Independent	Federalist
Home state	Virginia	Massachusetts
Electoral vote	3	3
Percentage	100.00%	–
President before election
George Washington
Independent
Elected President
George Washington
Independent

A presidential election was held in Delaware between November 2 and December 5, 1792, as part of the 1792 United States presidential election. The state legislature chose three members of the Electoral College, each of whom, under the provisions of the Constitution prior to the passage of the Twelfth Amendment, cast two votes for President.

Delaware's three electors each cast one vote for the incumbent, George Washington, and one vote for John Adams, the incumbent Vice President.

== Results ==
1792 United States presidential election in Delaware
Party	Candidate	Electoral Vote	%
Independent	George Washington	3	100.00%
Total votes		3	100.00%

=== Results by elector ===
1792 United States presidential election in Delaware
Party	Candidate	Votes	%
Federalist	James Sykes	26	43.33%
Federalist	Gunning Bedford Sr.	17	28.33%
Federalist	William Hill Wells	17	28.33%
Federalist	Nathaniel Mitchell	0	0.00%
Democratic-Republican	Thomas Montgomery (Note: Explicitly ran as an anti-federalist in 1792 run for governor.)	0	0.00%
Total votes		60	100.00%

== See also ==
- United States presidential elections in Delaware
