= List of 1792 United States presidential electors =

This is an incomplete list of presidential electors in the United States presidential election of 1792.

== Maryland ==
All 8 electors who attended voted for George Washington and John Adams.

- Western Shore
  - John Eager Howard
  - Thomas Sim Lee
  - Alexander Contee Hanson
  - Richard Potts
  - William Smith, elected but did not attend
  - Samuel Hughes, elected but did not attend
- Eastern Shore
  - William Richardson
  - Donaldson Yates
  - John Seney
  - Levin Winder

== New Jersey ==
- Richard Stockton

== Rhode Island ==
- Samuel J. Potter

== See also ==
- 1792 United States presidential election
