= 1792 United States presidential election in Connecticut =

- November 2 – December 5, 1792
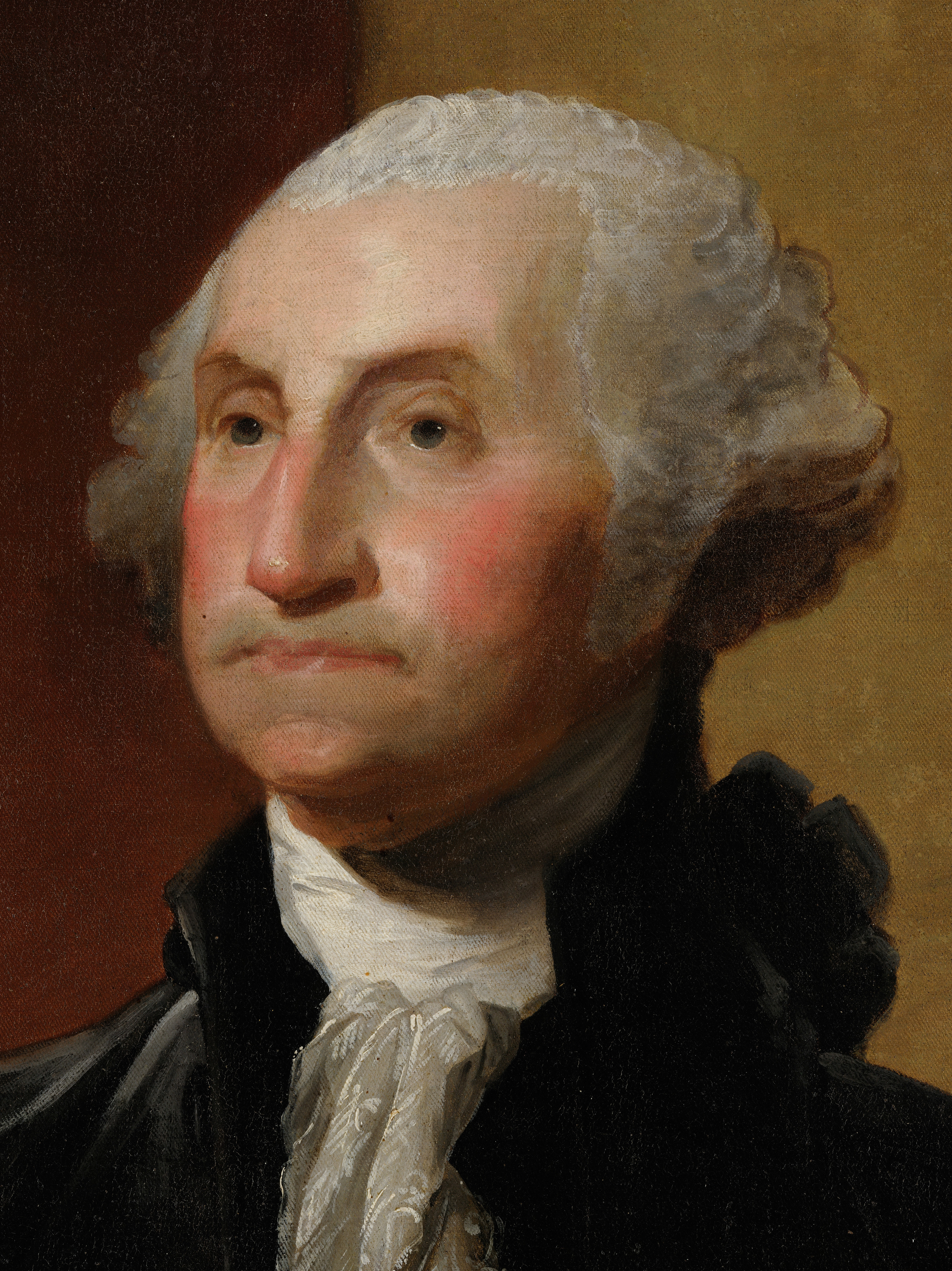

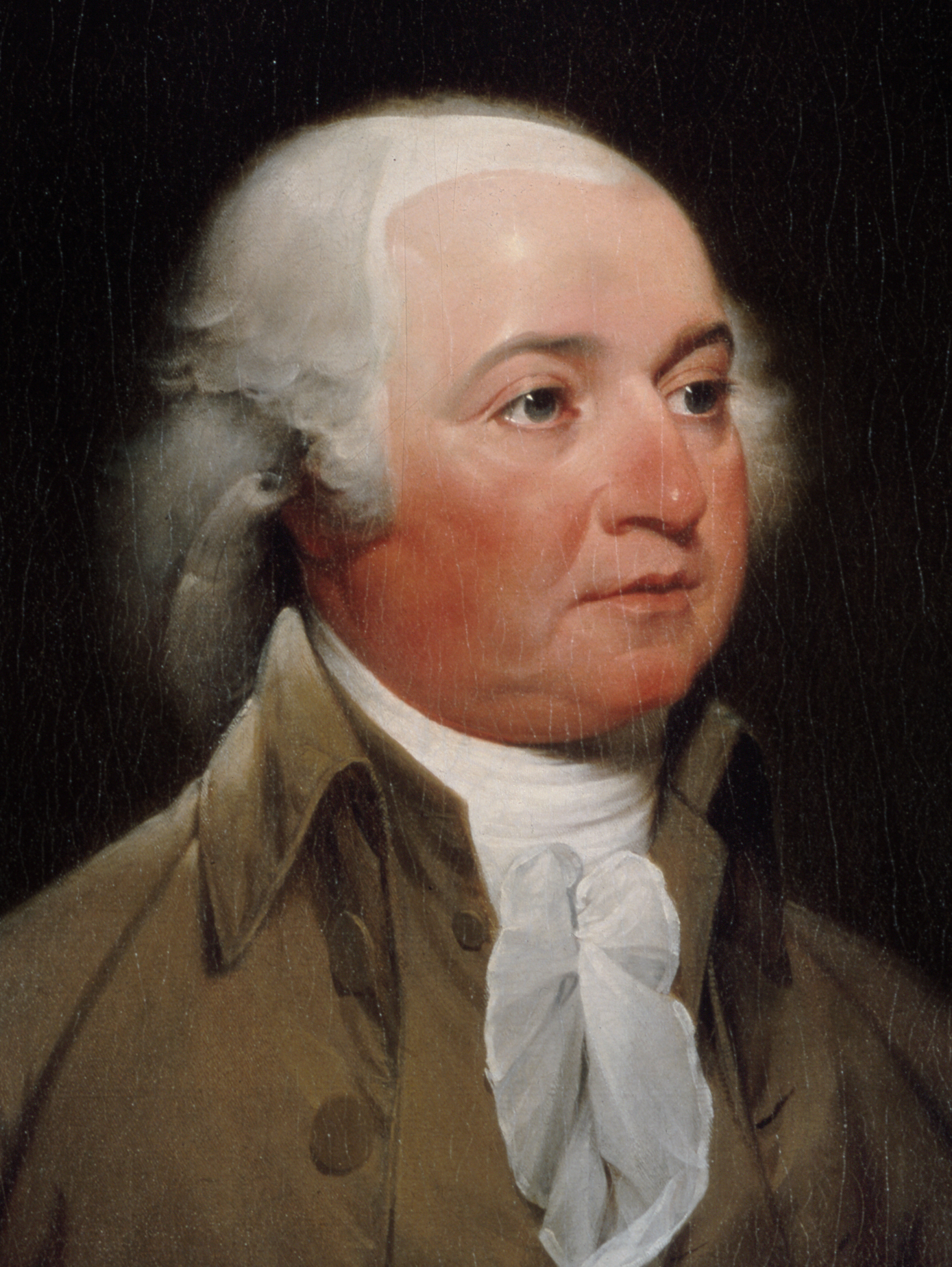
Nominee	George Washington	John Adams
Party	Independent	Federalist
Home state	Virginia	Massachusetts
Electoral vote	9	9
Percentage	100.00%	–
President before election
George Washington
Independent
Elected President
George Washington
Independent

A presidential election was held in Connecticut between November 2 and December 5, 1792, as part of the 1792 United States presidential election. The state legislature chose nine members of the Electoral College, each of whom, under the provisions of the Constitution prior to the passage of the Twelfth Amendment, cast two votes for President.

Connecticut's nine electors each cast one vote for incumbent George Washington and one for incumbent Vice President John Adams.

== Results ==
1792 United States presidential election in Connecticut
Party	Candidate	Electoral vote	%
Independent	George Washington	9	100.00%
Total votes		9	100.00%

=== Results by elector ===
1792 United States presidential election in Connecticut
Party	Candidate	Vice presidential vote
Federalist	David Austin	John Adams
Federalist	Elijah Hubbard	John Adams
Federalist	John Davenport Jr.	John Adams
Federalist	Marvin Wait	John Adams
Federalist	Oliver Wolcott	John Adams
Federalist	Samuel Huntington	John Adams
Federalist	Sylvester Gilbert	John Adams
Federalist	Thomas Grosvenor	John Adams
Federalist	Thomas Seymour	John Adams

== See also ==
- United States presidential elections in Connecticut
