= 1792 United States presidential election in Vermont =

- November 2 – December 5, 1792
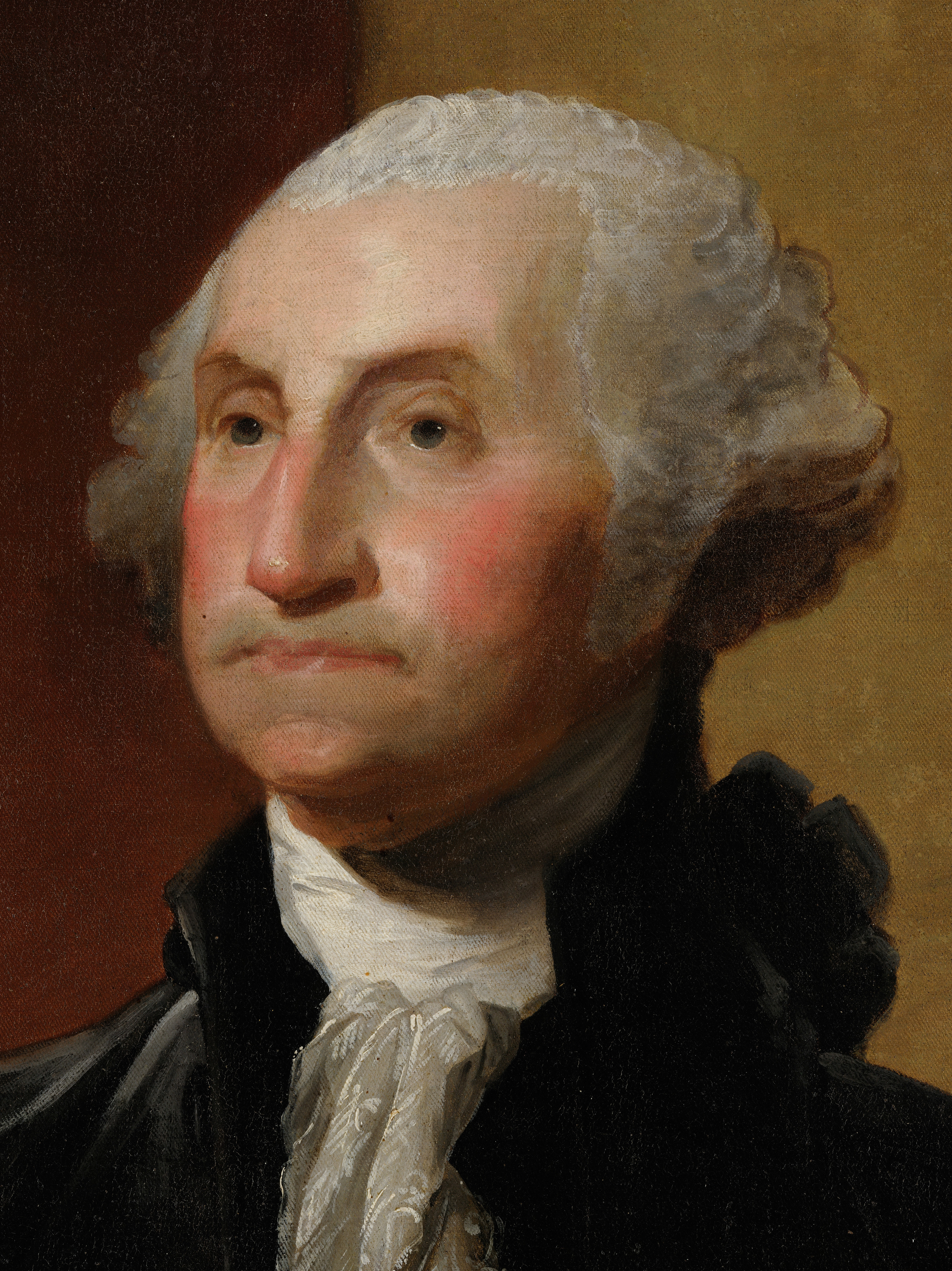

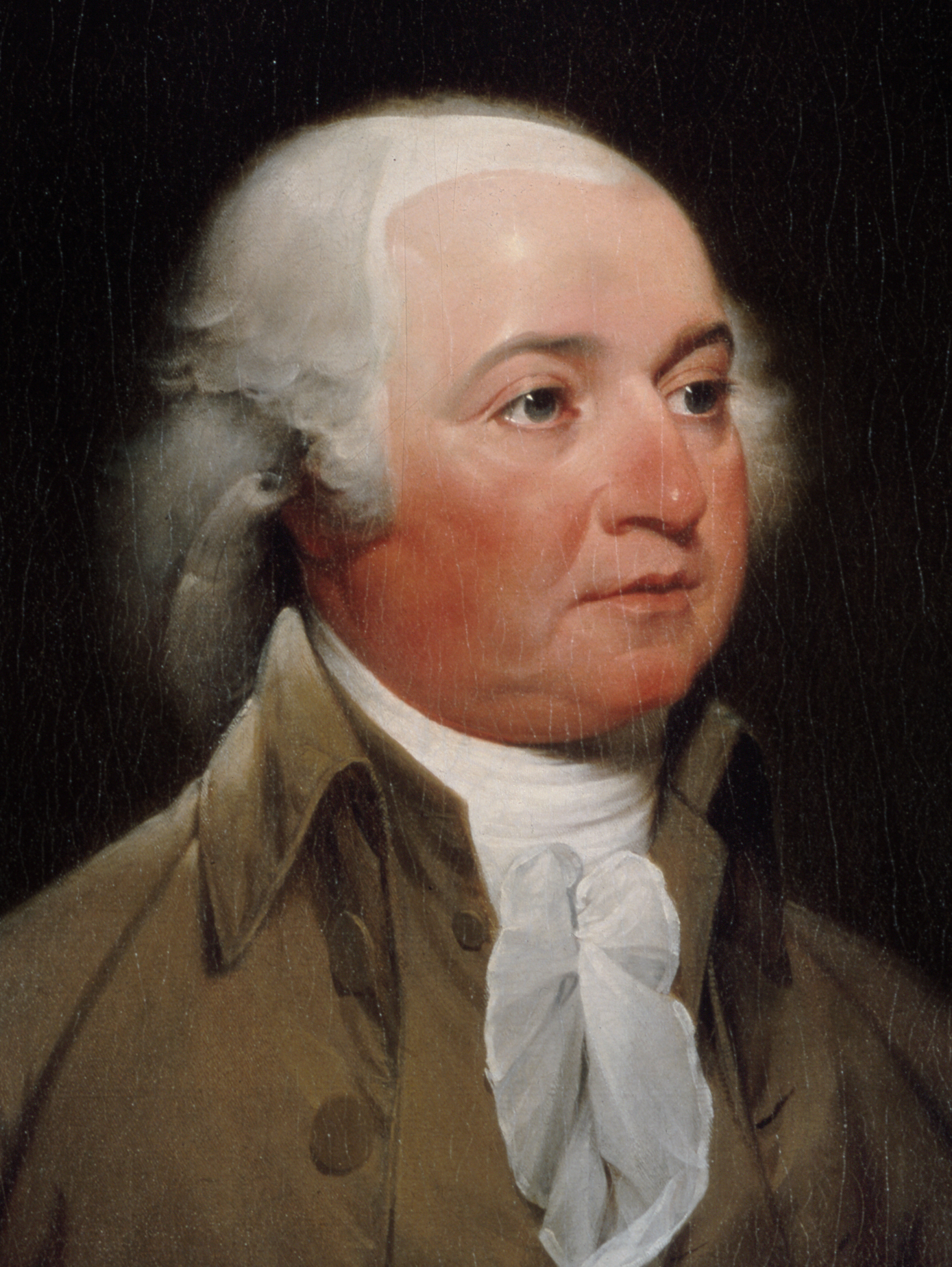
Nominee	George Washington	John Adams
Party	Independent	Federalist
Home state	Virginia	Massachusetts
Electoral vote	3	3
Percentage	100.00%	–
President before election
George Washington
Independent
Elected President
George Washington
Independent

A presidential election was held in Vermont between November 2 and December 5, 1792, as part of the 1792 United States presidential election. The state legislature chose four members of the Electoral College, each of whom, under the provisions of the Constitution prior to the passage of the Twelfth Amendment, cast two votes for president.

Vermont participated in its first ever presidential election, having admitted as the 14th state on March 4, 1791. The state cast three electoral votes for incumbent George Washington and three for the incumbent vice president John Adams; one elector did not cast his votes.

== See also ==
- United States presidential elections in Vermont
