= 1792 United States presidential election in Rhode Island =

- November 2 – December 5, 1792
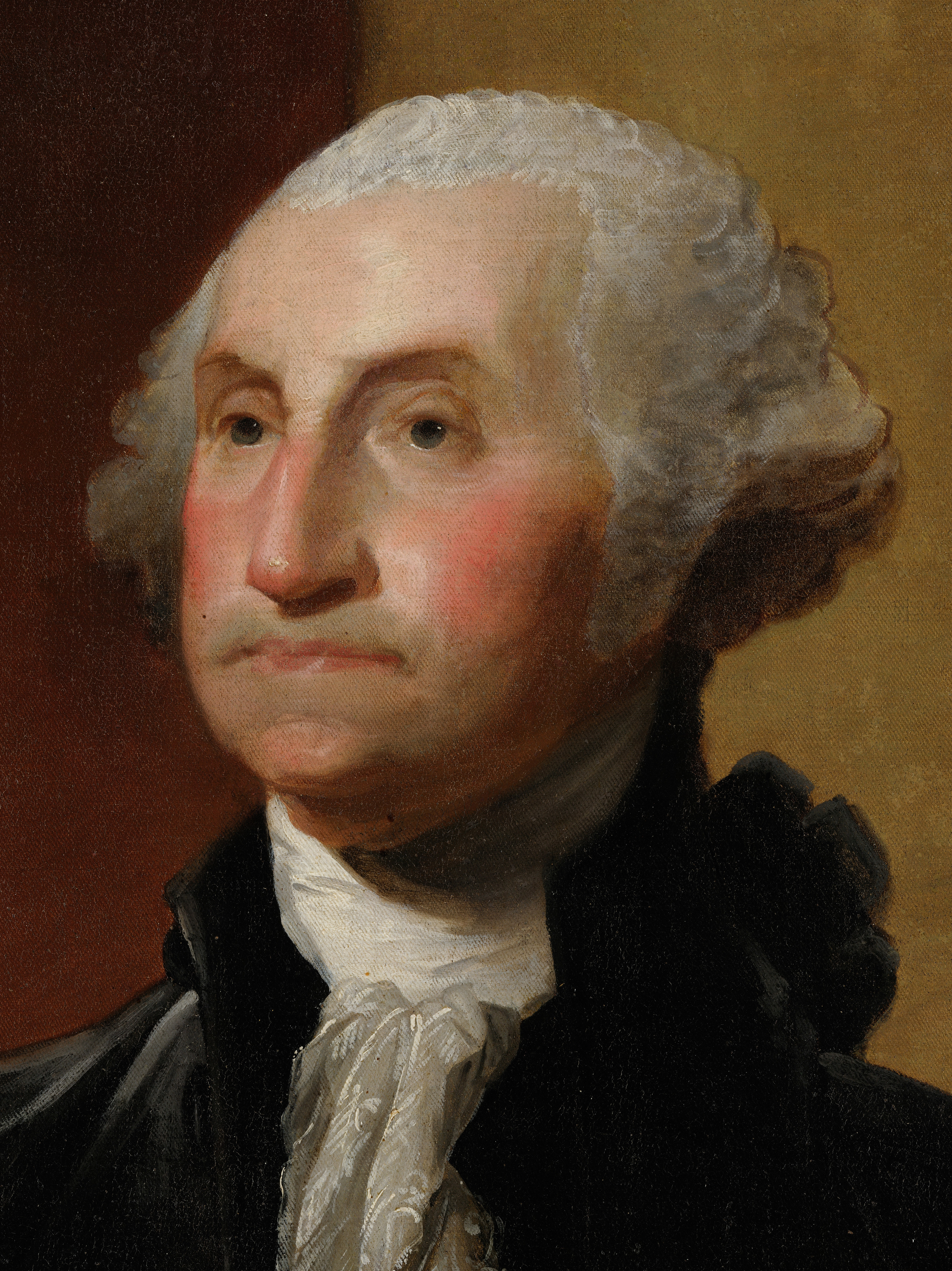

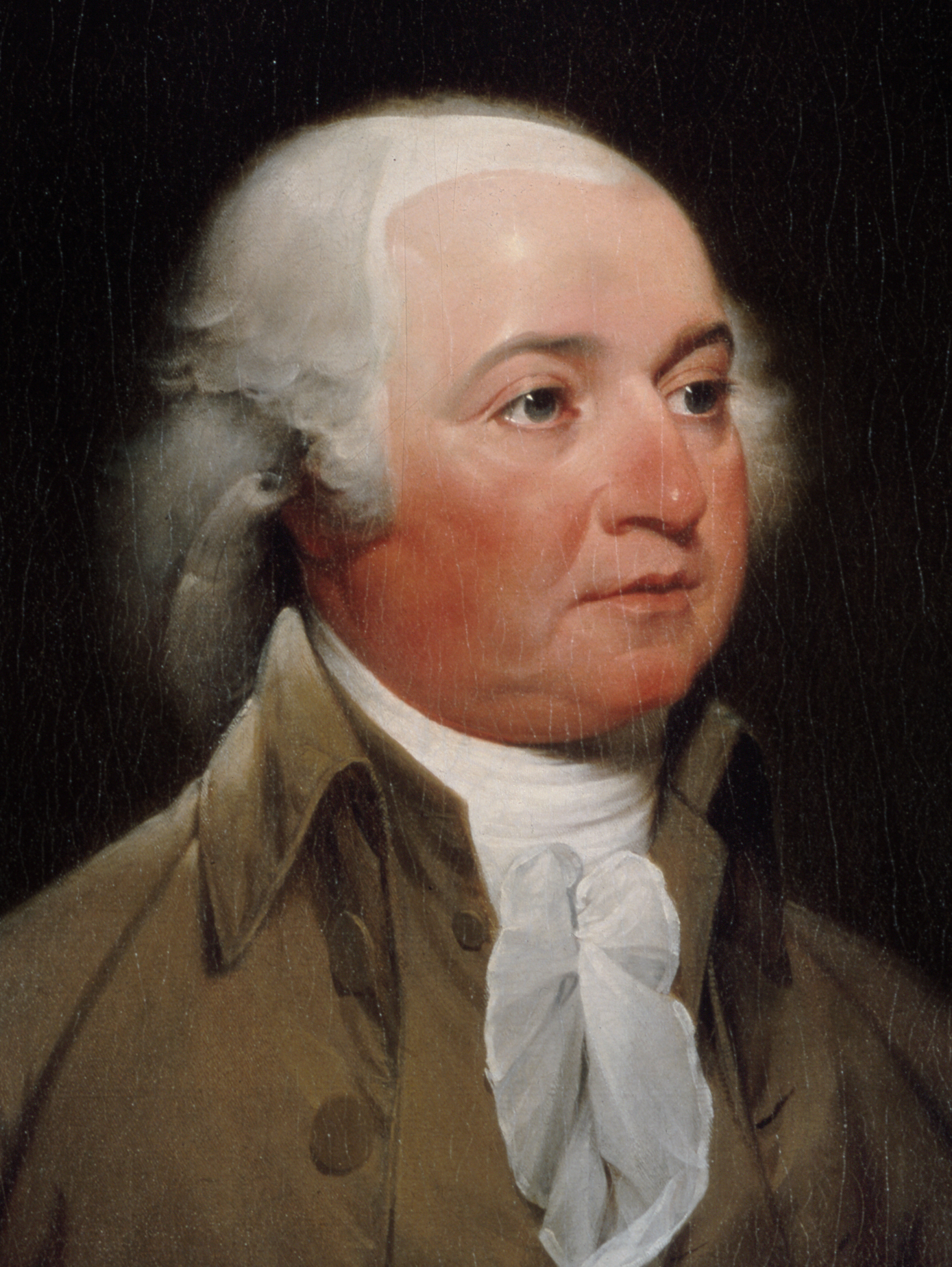
Nominee	George Washington	John Adams
Party	Independent	Federalist
Home state	Virginia	Massachusetts
Electoral vote	4	4
Percentage	100.00%
President before election
George Washington
Independent
Elected President
George Washington
Independent

A presidential election was held in Rhode Island as part of the 1792 United States presidential election. Voters chose four representatives, or electors to the Electoral College who voted for President and Vice President.

Rhode Island unanimously voted for the incumbent Independent President George Washington.

== Results ==
1792 United States presidential election in Rhode Island
Party	Candidate	Votes	Percentage	Electoral votes
Independent	George Washington (incumbent)	—	—	4
Federalist	John Adams	—	—	4
Totals		—	—	8

== See also ==
- United States presidential elections in Rhode Island
