= 1792 United States presidential election in North Carolina =

- November 2 – December 5, 1792
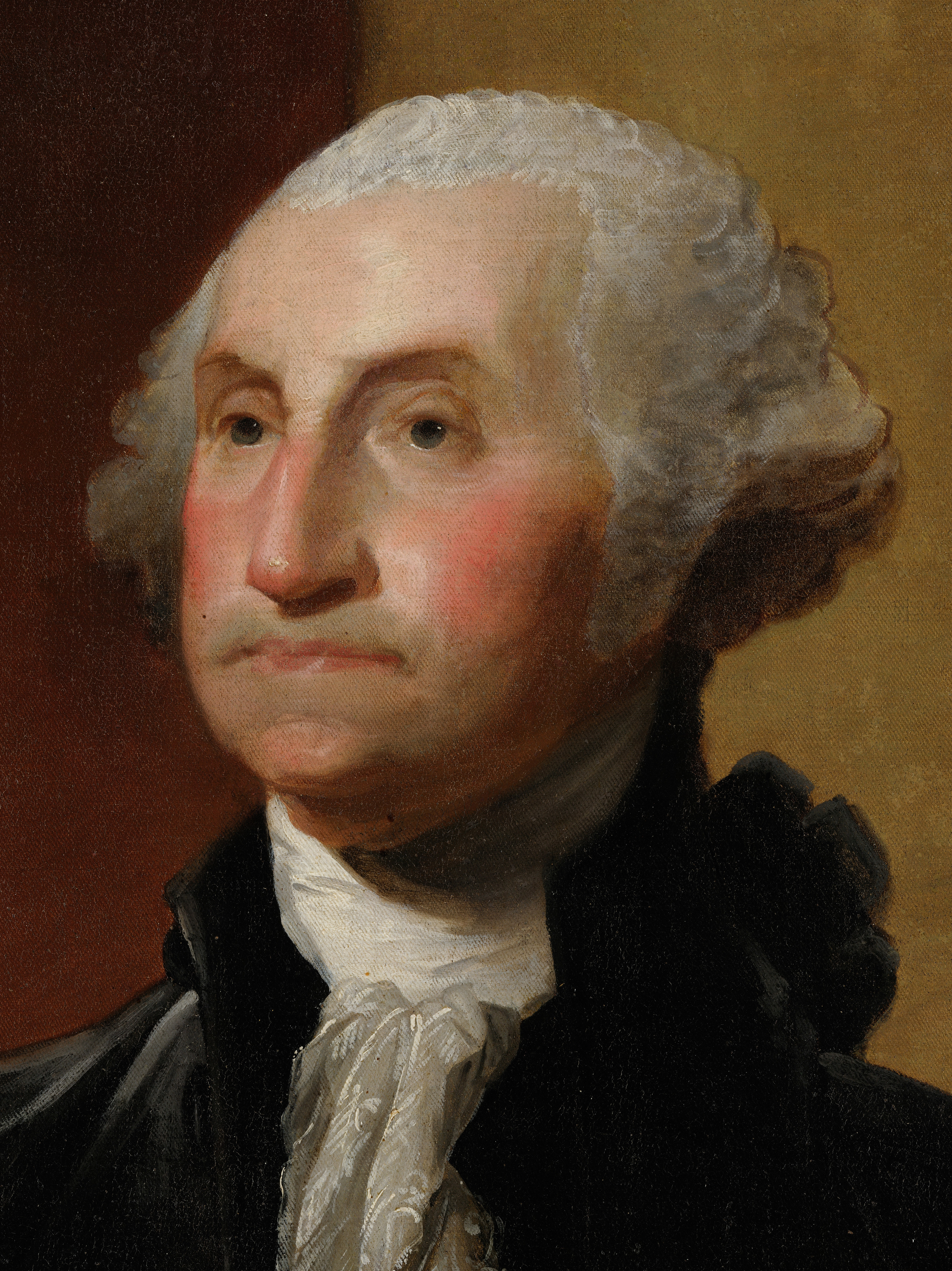

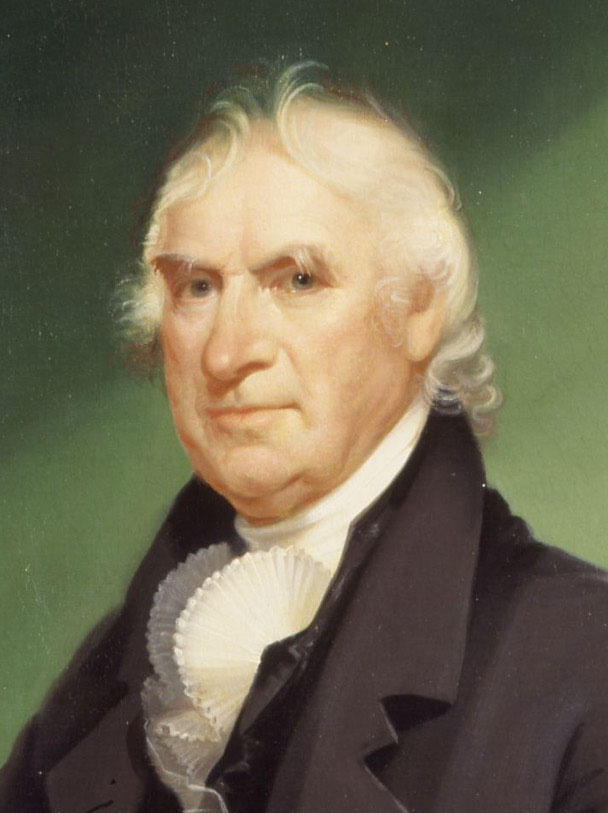
Nominee	George Washington	George Clinton
Party	Independent	Democratic-Republican
Home state	Virginia	New York
Electoral vote	12	12
Percentage	100.00%
President before election
George Washington
Independent
Elected President
George Washington
Independent

A presidential election was held in North Carolina between November 2 – December 5, 1792, as part of the 1792 United States presidential election. 12 members of the Electoral College were allocated to the presidential candidates.

Incumbent Independent President George Washington won and carried the state. This was also the first presidential election in the state of North Carolina.

== Background ==
North Carolina did not participate in the 1788–89 United States presidential election, as it did not ratify the Constitution of the United States until months after the end of that election and after George Washington had assumed office as President of the United States to become the 12th state.

== Results ==
1792 United States presidential election in North Carolina
Party	Candidate	Electoral votes
Independent	George Washington	12
Totals		12

== See also ==
- United States presidential elections in North Carolina
