= David Jackson (Pennsylvania physician) =

American physician

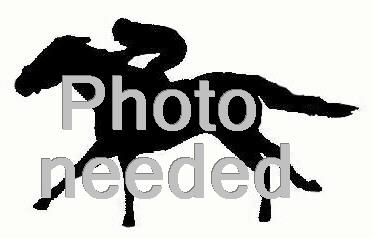
- President: George Washington

Personal details
- Born: 1747 Limavady, Northern Ireland
- Died: September 17, 1801 (aged 53–54) Oxford, Pennsylvania

David Jackson (1747 – September 17, 1801) was an American apothecary and physician from Philadelphia, Pennsylvania. He was a delegate for Pennsylvania to the Continental Congress in 1785.

== History ==
Jackson was born in Newtown-Limavady, County Londonderry, Ireland, the son of Samuel Jackson. He attended the College of Philadelphia in an institution now named University of Pennsylvania School of Medicine, graduating in first class of its medical department in 1768 with a degree in medicine. He settled in Chester, Pennsylvania and practiced there before opening a practice in Philadelphia.

In 1776, following the outbreak of the American Revolutionary War, Jackson worked on behalf of the Continental Congress as a manager of a lottery held to raise funds for the Continental Army. He also served as paymaster for the Pennsylvania militia. He was forced to leave Philadelphia when British forces occupied the city in 1777. In 1779 he briefly served in the field with the militia as a surgeon and quartermaster. Afterwards he returned to Philadelphia to resume his medical practice and open an apothecary shop.

After the war, Jackson was named as a delegate to the Continental Congress in 1785, and attended the session from April to November that year. Leaving public service, he also gave up his medical practice and concentrated on his pharmacy business. From 1789 to 1801 he served as a trustee of the University of the State of Pennsylvania, continuing through its merger into the University of Pennsylvania.

Jackson was married twice, first to Jane Mather Jackson, his brother Paul's widow. After her death he married Susan Kemper, the daughter of Jacob Kemper. David and Susan had nine children: David, Susan (who later became the sister-in-law to John Davis), Samuel, Mary, Jacob Morton, Sophia, William Brown, John, and Martha. David Jr. took over his father's apothecary, while Samuel became a physician and for thirty years was a professor of medicine at the University of Pennsylvania.

In 1792, Jackson was elected as a member of the American Philosophical Society in Philadelphia.

== Death ==
Jackson died on September 17, 1801, at his home in Oxford, Pennsylvania, and is buried in the Oxford Cemetery in Chester County, Pennsylvania. He was survived by his wife Susan and all nine children. He was a member of the American Philosophical Society and Philadelphia's Democratic Club.
