= Georgia State Route 371 =

Former state highway in Georgia, United States

State Route 371
- Post Road
- Former SR 371 highlighted in red

Route information
- Maintained by GDOT
- Length: 6.0 mi (9.7 km)

Major junctions
- South end: SR 9 northeast of Milton
- North end: SR 20 east of Free Home

Location
- Country: United States
- State: Georgia
- Counties: Forsyth

Highway system
- Georgia State Highway System; Interstate; US; State; Special
← SR 370	→ SR 372

State Route 371 (SR 371) was a 6.0-mile-long (9.7 km) two-lane south-to-north state highway in unincorporated Forsyth County in the north-central part of the U.S. state of Georgia. The highway connected SR 9 in the south to SR 20 in the north. SR 371 served as a connecting route for the residential neighborhoods between SR 9 and SR 20 to SR 400, the major north–south commuter route into and out of Atlanta. SR 371's path is known locally as Post Road.

== Route description ==
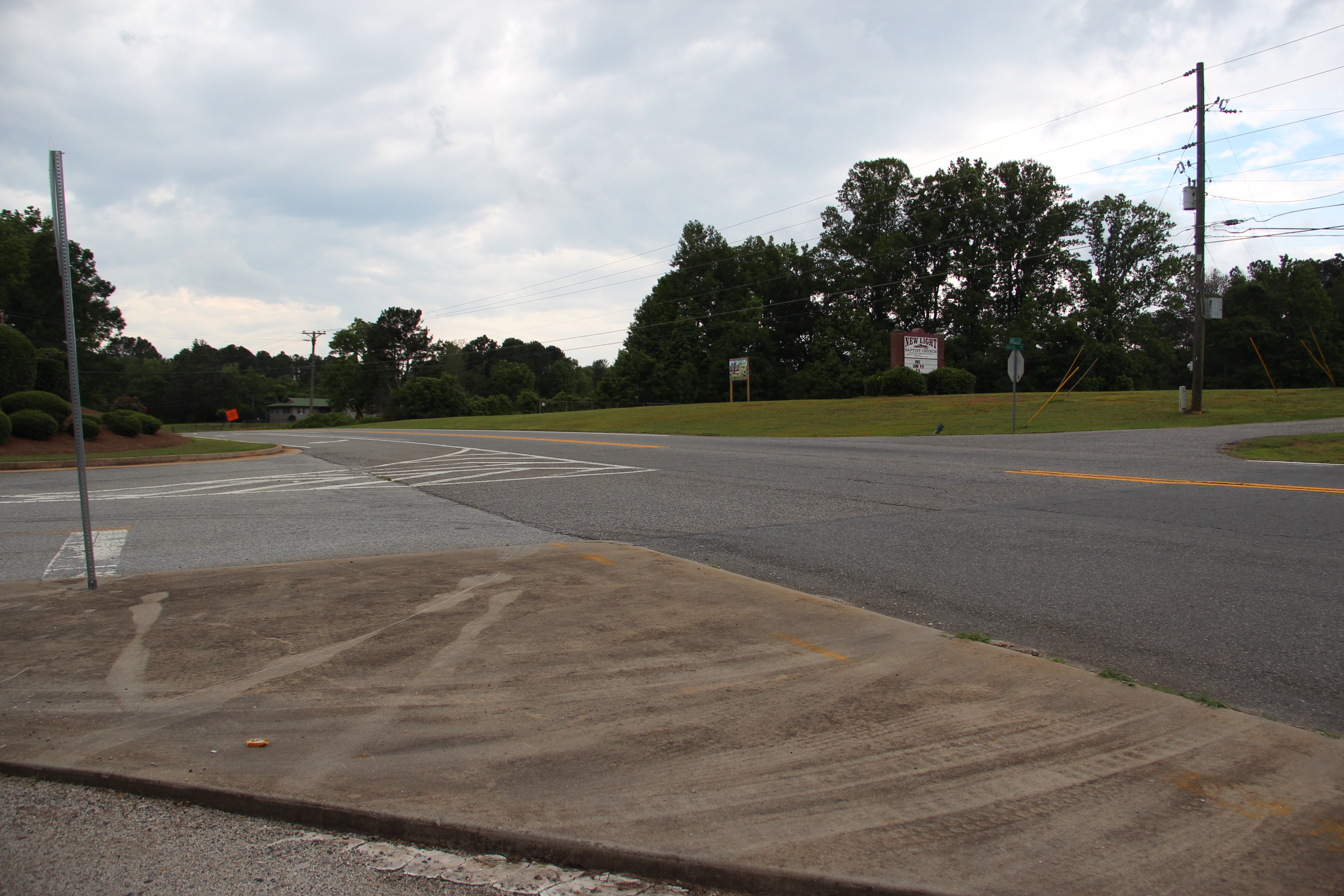
SR 371 in front of Covenant Christian Academy

SR 371 began at an intersection with SR 9 (Atlanta Highway) northeast of Milton and first traveled slightly to the northeast, then bended mostly north through the residential southwestern portion of Forsyth County, before reaching its northern terminus at SR 20 (Canton Highway) near the community of Ducktown. The area around the southern terminus of the highway features Alpharetta mailing addresses, with the majority of the route located in the 30040 ZIP code.

While the short highway has little statewide significance, it served as an important connector for local traffic in the area, as well as serving as a part of the commuter feeder route to SR 400. SR 371 is also utilized as a major school traffic connector for students of all ages, as both Vickery Creek Elementary School and Vickery Creek Middle School are located on the highway itself, and West Forsyth High School is just off the highway on Kelly Mill Road.

The Georgia Department of Transportation annual average daily traffic (AADT) numbers for the year 2011 show an average of 14,490 vehicles using the southern portion of the highway (between SR 9 and Kelly Mill Road) on a daily basis, with 97% of this traffic made up by personal vehicles.

== History ==
SR 371 was originally a part of SR 141, which existed among several disconnected segments. The portion that became SR 371 was first designated in 1944, where SR 141 left its concurrency with US 19/SR 9 and traveled north to SR 20. From 1944, the route is shown as graded, but not yet surfaced. It was 1957 before the route, still signed as SR 141, is marked as having been finished with a hard surface. On June 8, 1971, the route was renumbered as SR 371. as part of a truncation of SR 141 to south/east of US 19. SR 369 was another disconnected segment of SR 141 and had been renumbered a year prior when the route was extended west to SR 20 in Cherokee County. In 2020, SR 371 was decommissioned in a mileage swap with nearby Bethelview Road, which became an extension of the current SR 141 for some historical irony.

== Major intersections ==
The entire route was in Forsyth County.

Location	mi	km	Destinations	Notes
	0.0	0.0	SR 9 (Atlanta Highway) – Milton, Cumming	Southern terminus
	6.0	9.7	SR 20 (Canton Highway) – Canton, Cumming	Northern terminus
1.000 mi = 1.609 km; 1.000 km = 0.621 mi
