= Pablo Sandoval =

Venezuelan-American baseball player (born 1986)

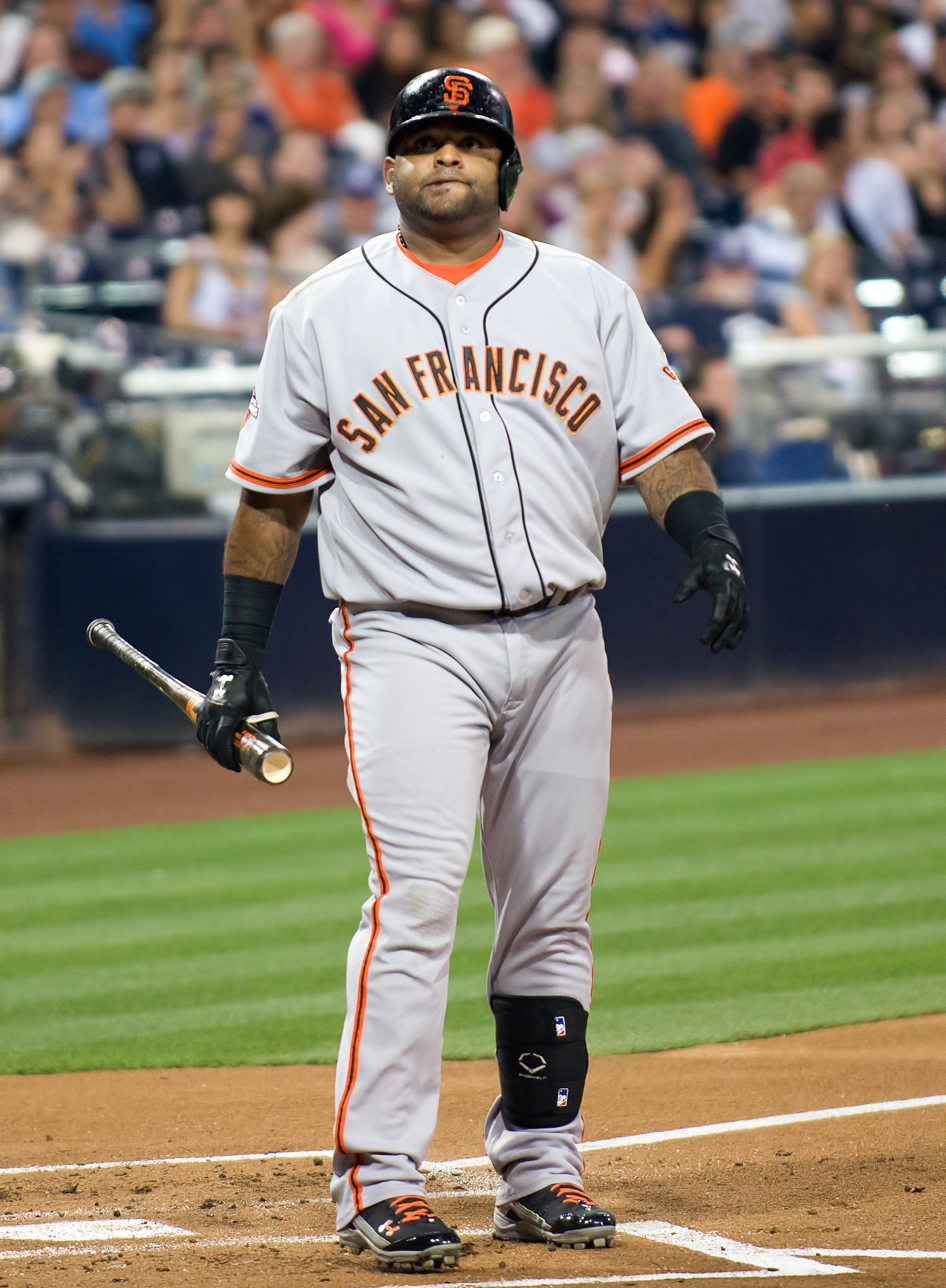
- Sandoval with the San Francisco Giants in 2013
- Third baseman
- Born: August 11, 1986 (age 40); Puerto Cabello, Carabobo, Venezuela
- Batted: Switch Threw: Right

MLB debut
- August 14, 2008, for the San Francisco Giants

Last MLB appearance
- July 29, 2021, for the Atlanta Braves

MLB statistics
- Batting average: .278
- Home runs: 153
- Runs batted in: 639
- Stats at Baseball Reference

Teams
- San Francisco Giants (2008–2014); Boston Red Sox (2015–2017); San Francisco Giants (2017–2020); Atlanta Braves (2020–2021)

Career highlights and awards
- 2× All-Star (2011, 2012); 4× World Series champion (2010, 2012, 2014, 2021); World Series MVP (2012); San Francisco Giants Wall of Fame

Pablo Emilio Sandoval Reyes (born August 11, 1986) is a Venezuelan former professional baseball third baseman. He played in Major League Baseball (MLB) for the San Francisco Giants, Boston Red Sox, and Atlanta Braves. He stands 5 feet 10 inches (1.78 m) tall, and weighs 268 pounds (122 kg). Nicknamed "The Kung Fu Panda", Sandoval is a two-time All-Star and has won three World Series championships with the Giants and one with the Braves. He hit three home runs in Game 1 of the 2012 World Series, becoming the fourth player to hit three home runs in a World Series game, leading to his being named that year's World Series Most Valuable Player (MVP). During the offseason, Sandoval plays for the Navegantes del Magallanes of the Venezuelan Professional Baseball League (VPBL).

In 2002, Sandoval was signed by the San Francisco Giants. Sandoval worked his way through the minor leagues and debuted with the Giants in 2008, batting .345 in 41 games. Capable of playing first base, third base, and catcher, he became the Giants' starting third baseman in 2009, ceasing to catch that year and playing first base only occasionally. In 2009, Sandoval finished second in All-Star Final Vote balloting, batting .330 with 25 home runs and 90 runs batted in (RBIs) in his first full season in the majors. However, Sandoval struggled in 2010 and was benched during the playoffs for the 2010 World Series, which the Giants won. He lost weight before 2011 and hit .315 with 23 home runs in 117 games. Injuries limited Sandoval to 109 games in 2012, but he was selected to his second-straight All-Star Game. Then, in Game 1 of the 2012 World Series, Sandoval joined Babe Ruth, Reggie Jackson, and Albert Pujols as the only players to hit three home runs in a World Series Game. For his contributions, Sandoval was named the World Series Most Valuable Player, as the Giants swept the Detroit Tigers. In 2013, he appeared in 141 games, batting .278, with 14 home runs, and 79 RBIs.

A free agent after the 2014 season, Sandoval signed a five-year contract with the Red Sox that offseason. Due to poor performance, the Red Sox released him in 2017. Sandoval then re-signed with the Giants, but the Red Sox remained responsible for paying his salary through the end of the 2019 season.

== Early life ==
Pablo Emilio Sandoval Reyes was born on August 11, 1986, to Pablo Sr. and Amelia Sandoval in Puerto Cabello, Carabobo, Venezuela. He grew up an avid baseball fan, following the careers of Omar Vizquel and Andrés Galarraga. He practiced baseball in an empty two-car garage with his older brother, Michael. His favorite players were Omar Vizquel (later his teammate on the Giants) and Andrés Galarraga. He was born left-handed, but wanted to be able to play shortstop like Vizquel. Thus, at nine, he taught himself to throw right-handed as well. He can still throw with both hands, but throws right-handed during games.

== Professional career ==
=== Minor leagues ===
Sandoval received notice from scouts in 2002, when he went to the Dominican Republic for a scouting tournament. A scout for the Texas Rangers told Sandoval he would come to Venezuela to sign him, but he did not show up. After two weeks, Ciro Villalobos, a scout for the San Francisco Giants, offered Sandoval a contract, and he signed. Sandoval began his professional career as a catcher in 2004 with the rookie AZL Giants, hitting .266 with no home runs and 26 runs batted in (RBI) in 177 at bats.

In 2005, he was used almost entirely as a third baseman while playing for the Single-A short season Salem-Keizer Volcanoes. He hit .330 (second in the Northwest League to Mike Mooney's .342) with three home runs and 50 RBIs (one behind Luis Valbuena's total). His batting average slumped in 2006 to .265. He had one home run and 49 RBIs with the Single-A Augusta GreenJackets of the South Atlantic League that year, splitting time between first and third base. In 2007, he played for the Single-A advanced San Jose Giants, hitting .287 with 11 homers and 52 RBIs. That season, he was used as a catcher and first baseman, and he helped San Jose win the California League championship.

In 2008, he spent time with two minor league teams, San Jose and the Double-A Connecticut Defenders of the Eastern League, before being called up to the majors. In 273 at bats for San Jose, he hit .359 with 12 home runs and 59 RBIs. In 175 at bats with Connecticut, he hit .337 with eight home runs and 37 RBIs. In total, he hit .350 with 20 home runs and 96 RBIs in 2008.

=== San Francisco Giants (2008–2014) ===
==== 2008 ====
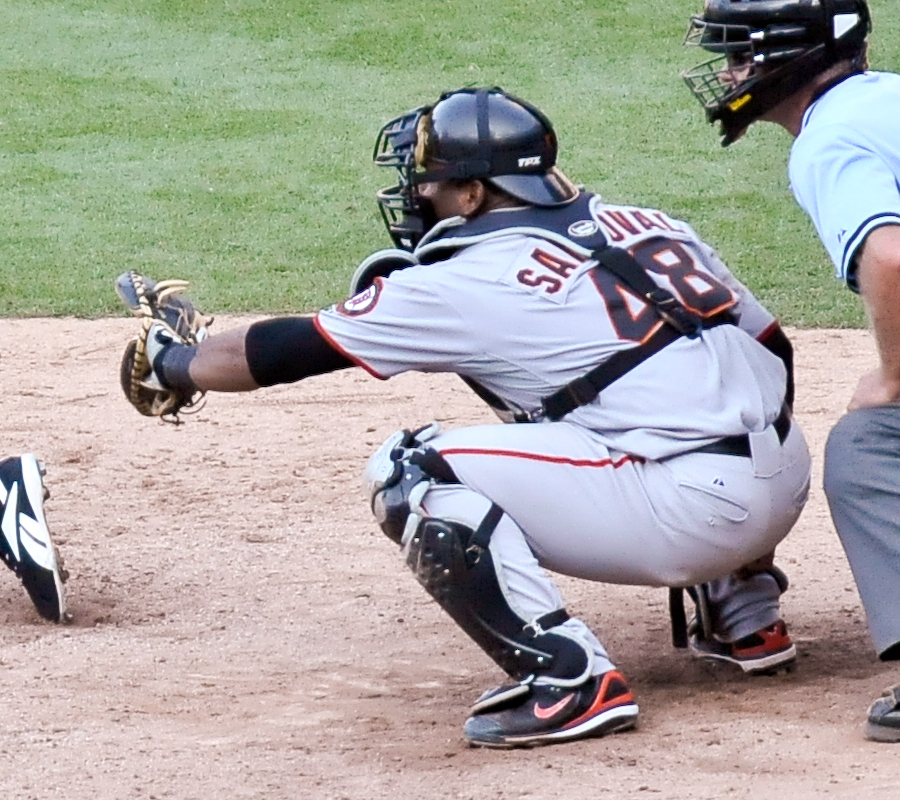
Sandoval catching for the San Francisco Giants.

Sandoval was called up to the Majors on August 13, 2008. He debuted the next day, going 0-for-3 in a 7–4 loss to the Houston Astros. In his first Major League Baseball (MLB) plate appearance, he hit an RBI sacrifice fly. He got his first hit against Mike Hampton in the second inning of his next game, August 16, on his way to going 3-for-5 in an 11–5 loss to the Atlanta Braves. In 41 games in 2008, he hit .345 with three home runs and 24 RBI, striking out 14 times and grounding into six double plays in 154 at-bats. He hit his first MLB home run on August 27 off Liván Hernández in a 4–1 triumph over the Colorado Rockies.

On defense, Sandoval was used at first base, at third base, and at catcher. Teammate Barry Zito gave Sandoval the nickname "Kung Fu Panda" (after the then-recent movie); in a Zito win on September 19, the rotund Sandoval scored a run against the Los Angeles Dodgers by acrobatically jumping over the tag of catcher Danny Ardoin.

==== 2009 ====
Sandoval made the Giants' Opening Day roster out of spring training in 2009 as the Giants' starting third baseman and backup catcher. He served as a personal catcher for Zito at the beginning of the year. On May 12, Sandoval hit his first walk-off home run against Joe Beimel to beat the Washington Nationals 9–7. Following an elbow injury to Sandoval in May, the Giants called up Eli Whiteside to serve as the backup catcher on May 24; since then, Sandoval has not been used at all as a catcher. After 73 games played, San Francisco Chronicle columnist Scott Ostler wrote that Sandoval had made the most impressive transition from the Giants farm system since 1986 when Will Clark and Robby Thompson were rookies.

Sandoval's first days in the majors were marked by a tendency to free swing. Giants hitting coach Carney Lansford noted that Sandoval contributed to the team's drawing the fewest walks in the National League at a time when the overall number of walks throughout baseball had increased. "As much as I try to get him to be disciplined, it's like caging a lion. He leaves the dugout ready to swing the bat. I literally tell him before every at-bat, 'Swing at a strike.'" Sandoval himself characterized his approach as "See ball, swing." In July 2009, he was named a Sprint Final Vote candidate for the 80th annual All-Star Game for the final roster spot on the National League team. He was edged by Shane Victorino of the Philadelphia Phillies on the last day of voting.

On July 6, Sandoval hit his first career grand slam at home at AT&T Park against Sean West of the visiting Florida Marlins in a 5–4 victory. He hit his first home run into McCovey Cove on July 30, the 50th anniversary of the MLB Debut of Willie McCovey, who was in attendance. Sandoval said after the game, "It's special right now. I hit McCovey Cove and McCovey's here. He talks to me every time he's in the clubhouse." Sandoval set a record for most hits by a Giants switch-hitter in a single season with 189 in 2009.

Sandoval finished the 2009 season with 25 home runs and 90 RBI in 153 games. He had the second-highest batting average among NL hitters, at .330 (behind Hanley Ramírez's .342), and finished seventh in NL MVP voting. Due to his service time in 2008, he was ineligible for the NL Rookie of the Year Award, which went to Chris Coghlan.

==== 2010 ====
During the offseason, the Giants had Sandoval work on losing weight. Sandoval, however, saw a sophomore slump in 2010. He struggled all season to come close to his 2009 totals and saw himself dropped to eighth in the batting order in a game on June 5. One bright spot in the season came on August 12, when Pat Burrell and Sandoval hit back-to-back home runs against Randy Wells of the Cubs in an 8–7 victory. Sandoval's home run snapped a 46-game home run drought. Sandoval finished the season with a .268 batting average, 13 home runs, and 63 RBI. He saw his batting average, as a right-handed hitter, plummet over 150 points from his 2009 batting average; he dropped from .379 to .227. His batting average with runners in scoring position also dropped during this period, from .301 in 2009 to .208 in 2010. Overweight and unproductive, he was benched during the 2010 National League Championship Series for Juan Uribe and limited to three at-bats in the 2010 World Series. However, Sandoval earned his first World Series ring as the Giants won their first World Series since 1954, securing the championship in five games over the Texas Rangers.

==== 2011 ====
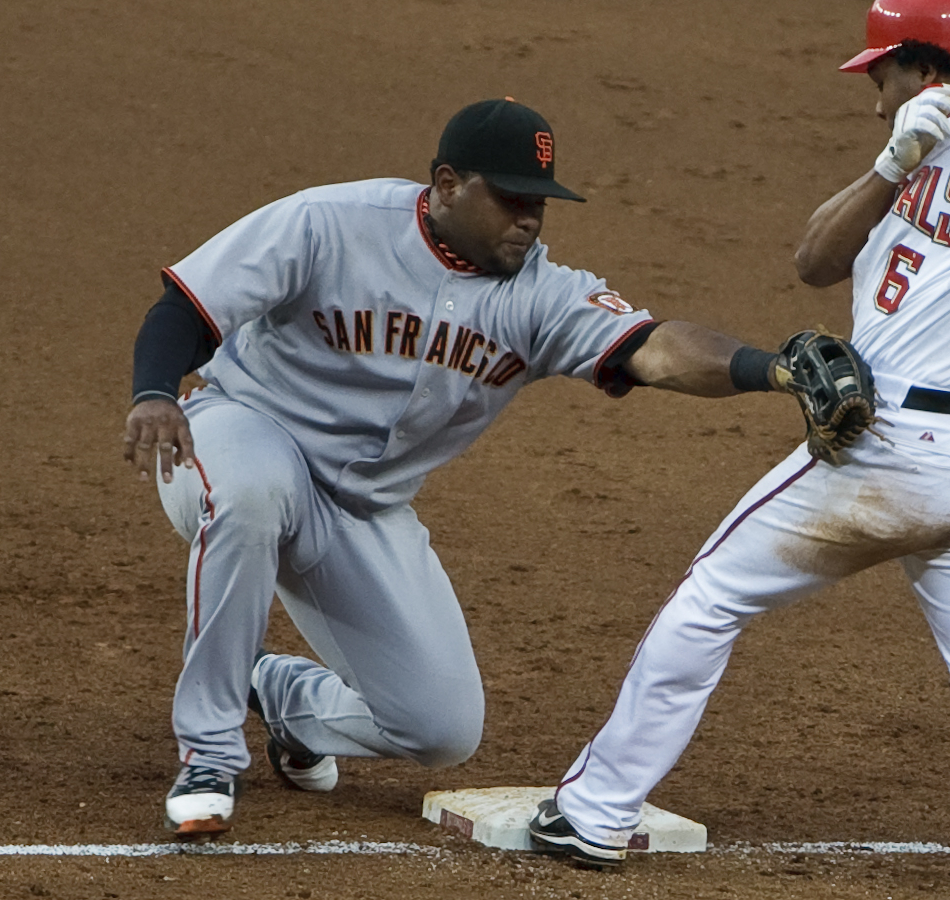
Sandoval tagging Anderson Hernández at third base.

Entering 2011, the Giants made a publicized campaign called "Operation Panda", which was aimed at getting Sandoval into better shape during the offseason. By the end of 2010, he had weighed 278 pounds (126 kg). Sandoval hired Triple Threat Performance of Tempe, Arizona, to help him lose weight and help improve his performance. He lost over 30 pounds (14 kg), and it led to results on the field for Sandoval. After a subpar 2010 season, Sandoval returned to his 2009 form. He got off to a good start in 2011, but suffered a broken right hamate bone in late April and missed 41 games. He was activated off the disabled list (DL) on June 14 and had a 22-game hitting streak from June 19 through July 14. On July 10, 2011, Sandoval was selected to the National League All-Star team, becoming the first All-Star position player for the Giants since Barry Bonds in 2007. In his first All-Star at bat, Sandoval hit an RBI ground-rule double against Brandon League, helping the NL win the 2011 MLB All-Star Game.

On September 15, 2011 at Coors Field, in an 8–5 win over the Colorado Rockies, Sandoval hit for the cycle against starting pitcher Jhoulys Chacín. He had (in order) a two-run home run in the first, a single in the second, a double in the fifth and a triple in the sixth. On September 19, 2011, Sandoval earned his first career "NL Player of the Week" Award. In 2011, Sandoval hit .315/.357/.552 with 23 home runs and 70 RBIs, a significant improvement from 2010. He only had 426 at bats for the season, down significantly from his totals from 2009 and 2010 due to the injury he suffered.

==== 2012 ====
On April 26, 2012 at Great American Ball Park, in a 6–5 win over the Cincinnati Reds, in the top of the fourth inning, Sandoval hit a line drive leadoff single off of starting pitcher Homer Bailey into left field. This was the 19th consecutive game since Opening Day in which Sandoval had a hit, setting a Giants franchise record for longest consecutive hitting streak to begin a season. The previous record – of 18 games – was set by Johnny Rucker in 1945. Sandoval ran it up to 20 before it was snapped. However, in May, Sandoval fractured his left hamate bone, an injury which kept him out until early June. Giants' head athletic trainer Dave Groeschner said the day before Sandoval had surgery, "I guess the good news is both [hamate bones] will be gone tomorrow and he can't do it again." On July 1, 2012, it was announced that Sandoval had beaten out David Wright for his second All-Star team, as the starting third baseman for the National League. The choice was considered somewhat controversial by fans and executives (particularly Sandy Alderson), as David Wright had a significantly higher batting average than Sandoval at the time. Wright made the team as a reserve, and as a reporter pointed out, Sandoval in 2009 "outperformed Wright, who was the fans' choice to start." On July 10, at Kansas City's Kauffman Stadium, Sandoval highlighted the NL's five-run opening inning with the first bases-loaded triple in the history of the Midsummer Classic, off of reigning American League (AL) Cy Young Award winner Justin Verlander.

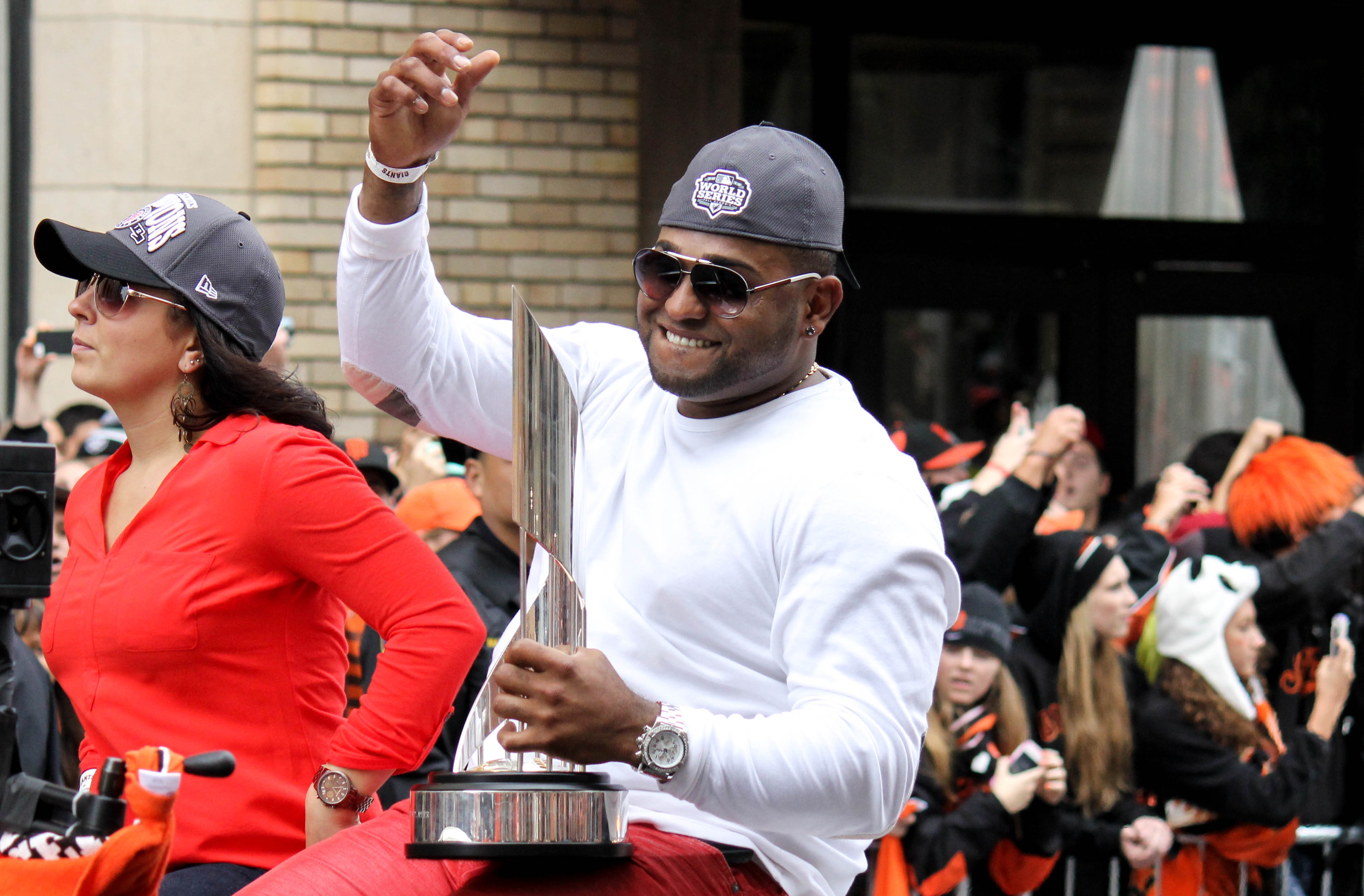
Sandoval in the 2012 World Series Parade.

Sandoval injured his left hamstring at the end of July and was on the DL for the second time in 2012, from July 28 through August 13. On September 20, he homered from both sides of the plate in a 9–2 victory over Colorado, becoming the sixth San Francisco Giant to accomplish the feat. In 108 games (396 at bats), Sandoval batted .283 with 112 hits, 12 home runs, and 63 RBI.

On October 24, 2012, in Game 1 of the 2012 World Series, Sandoval hit three home runs — two of them off Justin Verlander. He joined Babe Ruth, Reggie Jackson, and Albert Pujols as the only players in MLB history to hit three home runs in a World Series game, and is the first in history to hit those home runs in his first three plate appearances (in the first, third, and fifth innings). On October 28, Sandoval was named the World Series MVP. He also won the Babe Ruth Award for his overall postseason performance. Sandoval set a new Giants franchise record for most hits in a postseason with 24, which included six home runs.

==== 2013 ====
With the Giants trailing 1–0 in the ninth inning on April 30, 2013, Sandoval hit a two-run home run against J. J. Putz to give them a 2–1 victory over the Arizona Diamondbacks. At the end of April, he had 35 hits, tied for the NL lead with Starling Marte and, since 1900, the largest April total by a Giant. On May 21, at AT&T Park and fighting the flu, he hit a 10th-inning, two-run home run against Yunesky Maya to give the Giants a 4–2 victory over Washington. From June 9 through June 23, he was on the DL with a left foot injury. On August 16, he had four hits and reached safely in all six plate appearances during a 14–10 victory over the Miami Marlins. He hit three home runs on September 4 in a 13–5 victory over the Padres. With that performance, Sandoval joined Ruth, Jackson, Pujols, George Brett, and Adrián Beltré as the only players to have three-homer games in both the regular season and the playoffs. In 141 games, Sandoval batted .278 with 146 hits, 14 home runs, and 79 RBI.

==== 2014 ====
By the end of 2013, Sandoval again needed to lose weight. Encouraged by several of his teammates and Giants' general manager Brian Sabean, he showed up at spring training several pounds lighter. The weight loss did not lead to immediate results for Sandoval, who batted .167 with just six RBI in his first 31 games through May 6. However, over his next 42 games through June 21, he batted .351 with seven home runs and 27 RBI.

In the 2014 NLDS, with a game-tying, RBI double in the top of the ninth inning against the Washington Nationals, Sandoval extended his National League postseason hitting record to 13 consecutive games.

"Salvador Perez… the 2-2 - Popped up! [Pablo] Sandoval! In foul territory… GIANTS WIN! A World Series win for the San Francisco Giants, for the third time in the last five years! And their hero, Madison Bumgarner!"

— Joe Buck's final television call on Fox of the final out of the 2014 World Series clincher

"Madison Bumgarner trying to wrap up this World Series for the Giants. He's ready. He throws, swing and a POP-UP! [Pablo] Sandoval down the line in foul ground, he's got plenty of room, and he's got it! And the Giants have won; they have won the World Series for the third time in five years. And Madison Bumgarner has firmly etched his name on the all-time World Series record books as one of the greatest World Series pitchers the game has ever seen!"

— Jon Miller's final radio call on KNBR of the final out of the 2014 World Series clincher

In Game 3 of the 2014 World Series, his post-season on-base streak ended at 25. In Game 4, while ailing with the flu, his 13th multi-hit post-season game brought him to second in that category in franchise history, behind Frankie Frisch.

In Kansas City, in Game 7 of the World Series, Sandoval recorded his 26th hit of the postseason, which set a new record for most hits in a single postseason (it was eventually broken by Randy Arozarena in the 2020 World Series). He also caught Royals batter Salvador Pérez's pop-up foul ball for the final out to clinch the World Series championship for the San Francisco Giants. It was the Giants' third World Championship in a span of five seasons. Sandoval became a free agent after the season ended.

=== Boston Red Sox (2015–2017) ===
==== 2015 ====
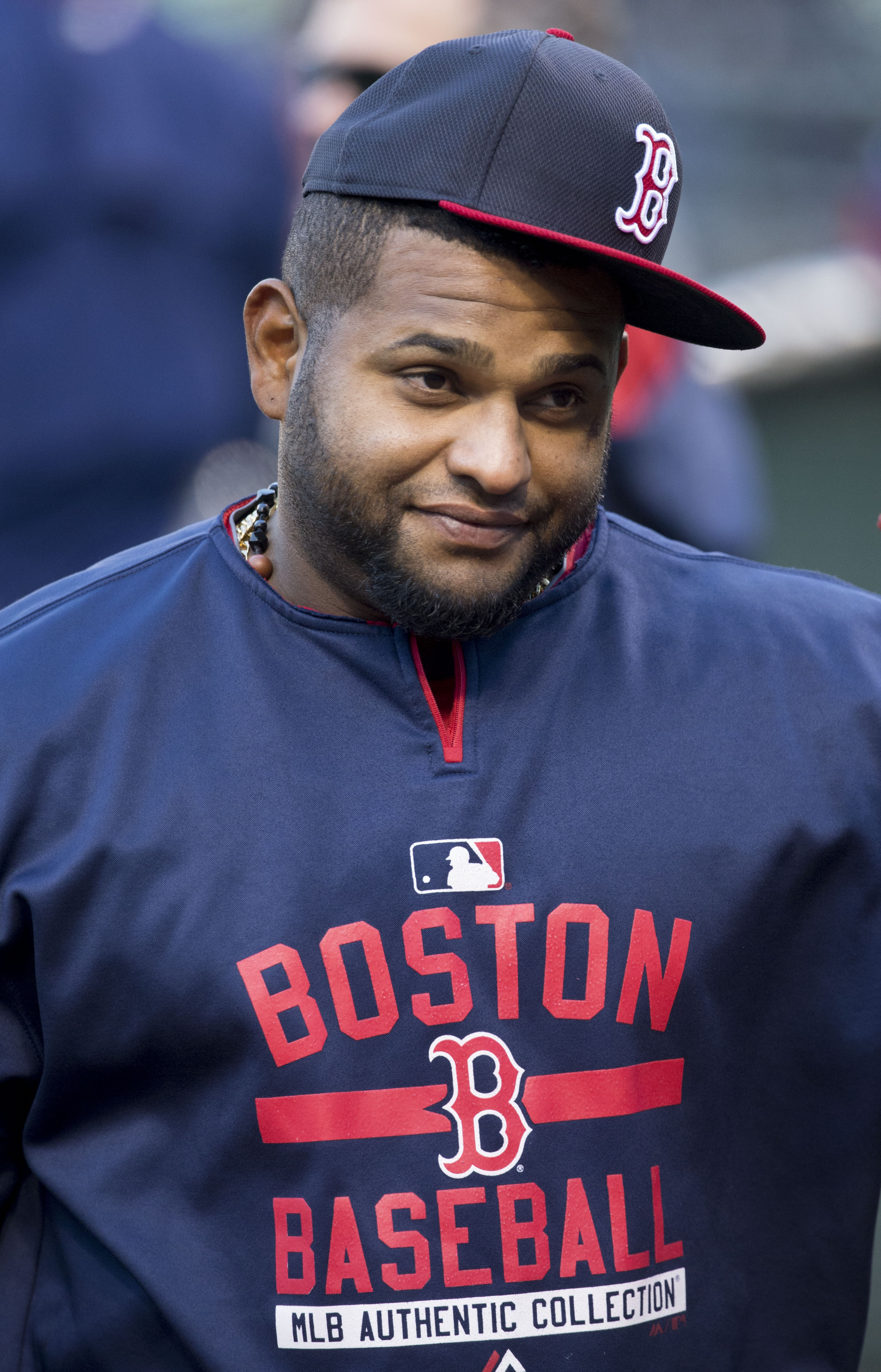
Sandoval with the Red Sox

On November 24, 2014, Sandoval came to an agreement with the Boston Red Sox on a five-year, $90 million contract with a sixth year club option of $17 million or a $5 million buy-out. The deal was officially announced on November 25. Sandoval said, "It was a tough decision for me. It took me a long time to be sure that I was going to make the right decision... But I want a new challenge. I made that choice to be here in Boston because I need a new challenge."

In 126 games of 2015, Sandoval batted .245 with 10 home runs and 47 RBI, all career lows since his first full season in 2009. He swung at 47.8% of pitches outside the strike zone (the highest percentage in the majors).

==== 2016 ====
In January 2016, Sandoval switched agents and became represented by Rick Thurman and Rafa Nieves of Beverly Hills Sports Council. Looking to improve upon his first season in Boston, an overweight Sandoval struggled in spring training, and was replaced by Travis Shaw as the starting third baseman. On April 13, Sandoval was placed on the 15-day disabled list due to a shoulder strain. On May 3, Sandoval underwent surgery on his left shoulder, sidelining him for the remainder of the season. On September 24, manager John Farrell told reporters that Sandoval was progressing ahead of schedule in his rehab, and could be an option for the Red Sox in the postseason should a need arise, as the team did acquire Aaron Hill during the season to help with third base depth. Sandoval also made an effort at improving his fitness, losing 15 pounds by August while working at the Red Sox facility in Fort Myers. Due to the injury Sandoval ended his 2016 season with six at bats.

==== 2017 ====
Heading into the 2017 season, Sandoval battled in spring training to become the third baseman, competing against Josh Rutledge and a few others. Sandoval won the job after posting solid spring training numbers. He began hitting at the bottom of the Boston lineup, mainly between 6th and 8th in the order. Through 108 plate appearances, Sandoval continued his struggle from the 2015 season, hitting just .212 for the Red Sox before being placed on the 10-day disabled list on June 20 with an inner ear infection. On June 27, he began a rehab assignment with the Pawtucket Red Sox of the Class AAA International League. He was designated for assignment by the Red Sox on July 14, and released on July 19.

=== Second stint with Giants (2017–2020) ===
==== 2017 ====
On July 22, 2017, the Giants signed Sandoval to a minor league contract. Upon rejoining the Giants' organization, Sandoval played three games with the Class A-Advanced San Jose Giants and nine games with the Triple-A Sacramento River Cats, where he batted .222 and .207, respectively. On August 5, Sandoval was called up to San Francisco after Brandon Belt was put on the disabled list for a concussion. With the 2017 Giants, Sandoval appeared in 47 games, batting .225 with five home runs and 20 RBIs; defensively, he made 38 appearances at third base and nine appearances at first base.

==== 2018 ====
The Giants picked up Sandoval's option, worth the league minimum, for 2018. He had a strong spring training, hitting four home runs as part of a .302/.333/.585 slash line. He made the opening day roster out of spring training as a bench player, likely as a backup to newly acquired third baseman Evan Longoria.

On April 28, Sandoval debuted as a pitcher in a 15–6 loss to the Los Angeles Dodgers. He pitched a perfect ninth inning, inducing three groundouts with mostly curveballs averaging around 70 mph. In 92 games for the Giants, he hit .248/.310/.417 with 9 home runs and 40 RBIs.

==== 2019 ====
Sandoval appeared in more than 100 games for the Giants in 2019, playing at third base and first base, and pitching in one game. He also led the major leagues with 18 pinch hits, but was hampered by elbow problems. Two days before having Tommy John surgery, he came off the injured list to make a final appearance for retiring manager Bruce Bochy on September 1, 2019. Sandoval was the 2019 nominee from the Giants for the annual Roberto Clemente Award for contributions on and off the field. He batted .268/.313/.507 with 14 home runs and 41 RBIs, and had his first stolen base since 2012.

==== 2020 ====
On January 31, 2020, Sandoval agreed to a minor-league contract with the Giants and would get a one-year, $2 million deal if he was added to the 40-man roster. Sandoval made the Opening Day roster for the Giants when his contract was selected on July 23. On September 10, Sandoval was designated for assignment and placed on release waivers by the Giants. In 2020 with the Giants, he batted .220/.278/.268 with one home run and 6 RBIs in 90 plate appearances.

=== Atlanta Braves (2020–2021) ===
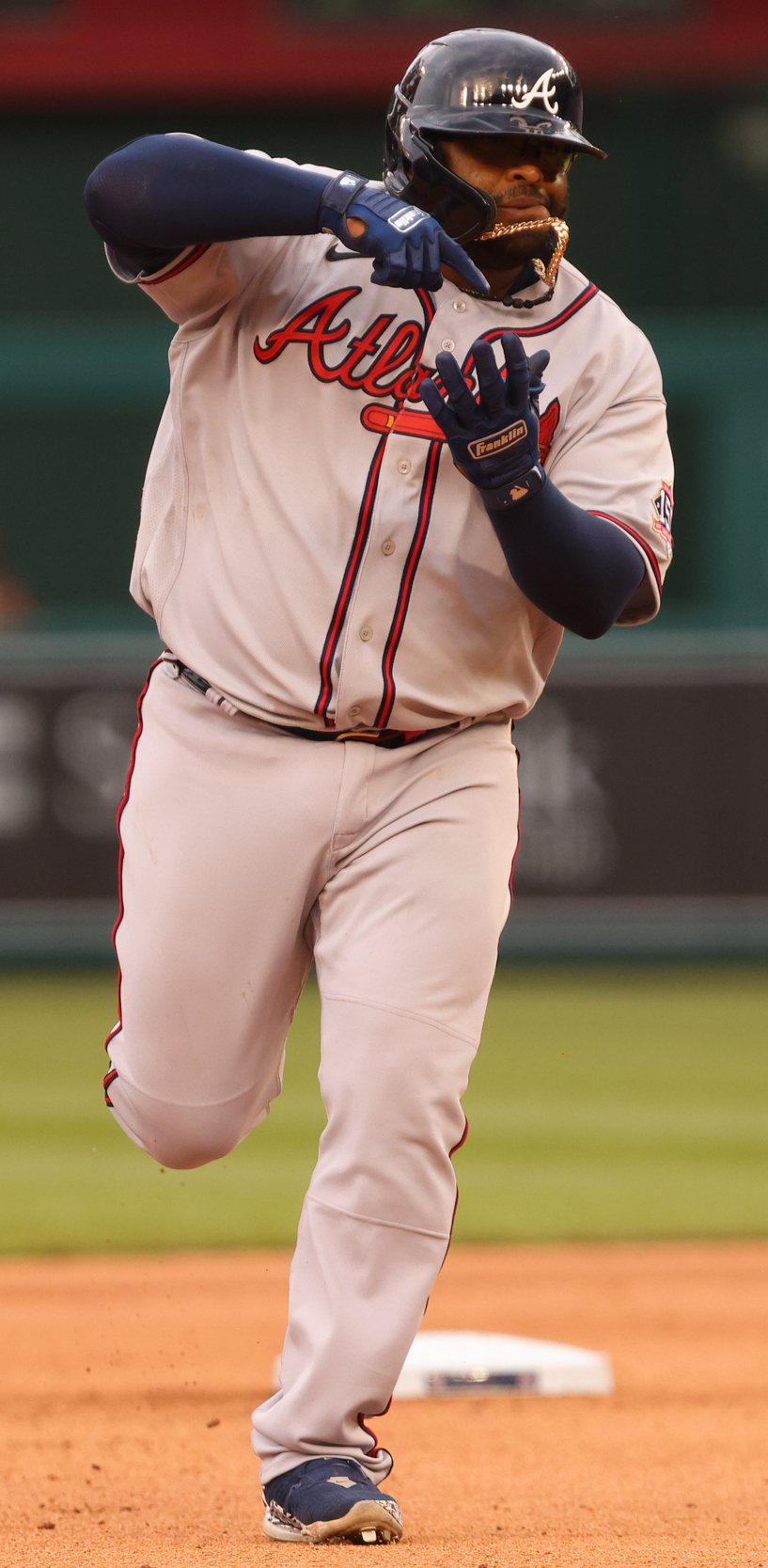
Sandoval with the Braves in 2021

On September 14, 2020, Sandoval signed a minor league contract with the Atlanta Braves. On September 27, the Braves added Sandoval to the 40-man and active rosters. With Sandoval's usual number 48 being used by Ian Anderson, Sandoval settled with the number 18. In the 2020 regular season, he was 0-for-2 for the team. He made a pinch-hit appearance in Game 1 of the 2020 National League Championship Series after not playing in the Wild Card Series or the Division Series, appearing in the eighth inning with two runners on and two out; he was hit by a pitch after two pitches. He played third base for the ninth inning as the Braves won 5-1.

On January 24, 2021, Sandoval re-signed with the Braves on a minor league contract. On March 27, 2021, Sandoval was selected to the 40-man roster. Sandoval hit two home runs in his first three at-bats, including what turned out to be the game-winner on April 7, 2021. Sandoval was traded to the Cleveland Indians on July 30 in exchange for Eddie Rosario and cash considerations, and was immediately released. In 2021 he batted .178/.302/.342. That year he had the third-slowest sprint speed of all major leaguers, at 22.7 feet/second, ahead of only Albert Pujols and Yadier Molina. Although not on the team for the playoffs, Sandoval received a ring from the Braves following their 2021 World Series Championship, giving him his fourth ring.

=== Foreign leagues ===
On February 7, 2022, Sandoval signed with the Acereros de Monclova of the Mexican League. In 28 games, he batted .240/.311/.356 with 3 home runs and 18 RBIs. Sandoval was waived by the team on May 26. On May 27, 2022, Sandoval was claimed off waivers by the Olmecas de Tabasco. In 43 games, he slashed .311/.396/.466 with 7 home runs and 24 RBIs. Following the season, the team announced they would be parting ways, and Sandoval was officially released on January 19, 2023.

On October 23, 2023, Sandoval was selected by the Abu Dhabi Falcons in the inaugural Baseball United draft. Sandoval played for the United West All-Stars during the 2023 All-Star Showcase in November 2023, starting at third base in both of the showcase games and hitting a six-run home run during a "moneyball" at bat in which each run batted in counts as two.

During the offseason, Sandoval played for the Navegantes del Magallanes of the Venezuelan Professional Baseball League (LVBP). Retiring in the 2026-2027 season.

=== Staten Island FerryHawks ===
On February 17, 2024, Sandoval signed a minor league contract with the San Francisco Giants. Historically a switch-hitter, Sandoval only batted left handed in his comeback bid. He was released by the Giants organization on March 28 after slashing .250/.323/.250 in 31 Spring Training plate appearances.

On April 6, 2024, Sandoval signed with the Staten Island FerryHawks of the Atlantic League of Professional Baseball. In 120 games for Staten Island, he batted .248/.314/.362 with 10 home runs and 79 RBI. On September 14, Sandoval was the starting pitcher against the Lancaster Stormers. He pitched 5 1/3 innings, 4 hits, no runs, 1 walk and earned the win in a quality start. Sandoval became a free agent following the season.

On March 31, 2025, Sandoval re-signed with Staten Island. In 104 games for the team, he hit .230/.308/.365 with 13 home runs and 63 RBI.

On November 15, 2026, Sandoval announced his retirement from professional baseball.

== Post-playing career ==
Sandoval announced he would not play in 2026 while attending the Giants spring training camp as a guest instructor, but he had not retired yet..

== International career ==
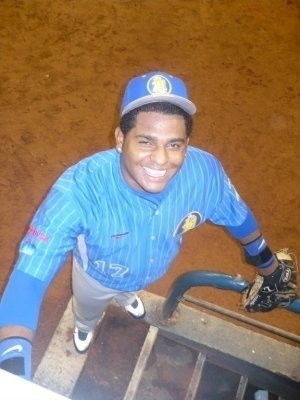
Sandoval with the Navegantes del Magallanes

Like many Venezuelan MLB players, Sandoval plays in the Venezuelan Winter League during the offseason. He plays for the Navegantes del Magallanes. In 2013, Sandoval led his team to its first series title since the 2002 winter ball season. He was named the MVP of the Venezuelan postseason, three months after being named the 2012 World Series MVP. Sandoval said, "There's nothing like being champion here in Venezuela with the Navegantes. Although it can't be compared with winning the World Series, because they're different things. But it's very special to be champion here."

== Personal life ==
Sandoval's parents run a mechanical engineering firm in Valencia, Venezuela. On September 9, 2010, Sandoval's mother Amelia and his older brother Michael evacuated the home Sandoval was renting during the San Bruno pipeline explosion. His older brother, Michael, played in the Minnesota Twins' organization from 1999 through 2004 and, after a year of independent ball in 2009, played for San Jose in 2010. Sandoval is a Christian and has spoken about the importance of "seizing the opportunities offered in life by God and the need to fight tirelessly, not to survive but to excel." Sandoval lives in Miami, Florida with his five children.

== See also ==
- List of Major League Baseball batting champions
- List of Major League Baseball players from Venezuela
- List of Major League Baseball players to hit for the cycle

Achievements
Preceded by George Kottaras	Hitting for the cycle September 15, 2011	Succeeded by Scott Hairston
