= Free Home, Georgia =

Unincorporated community in Georgia, U.S.

Coordinates: 34°14′19″N 84°17′20″W

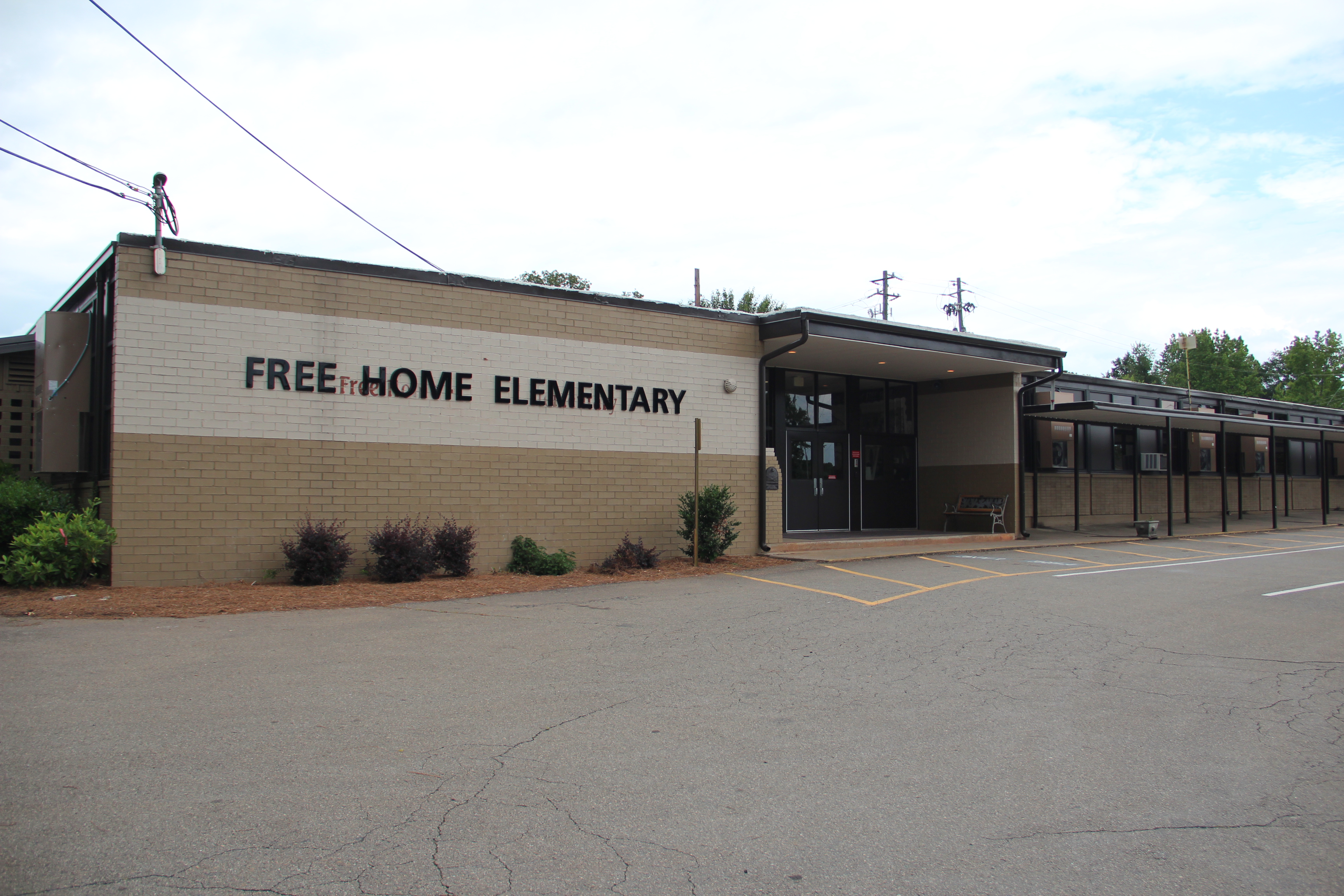
Free Home Elementary School

Free Home is an unincorporated community in the eastern part of Cherokee County, Georgia, United States. Centered at the intersection of state highways 20 and 372, the rural community has seen moderate suburbanization of the area since the late 1990s. It is home to Free Home Elementary School.

Free Home is about halfway between Ball Ground to the north and Milton to the south-southeast on Georgia 372 (also called Free Home Highway and Birmingham Highway, for the community now within Milton). On Cumming Highway (Georgia 20), it is also about halfway between Canton (west) and Cumming (east), the Cherokee and Forsyth county seats. The Little River begins as a small stream just southeast of Free Home, near Free Home Road.

== History ==
Free Home was named by Captain Delevan Lively who owned land in the area around the Crossroads Militia District in Cherokee County. Due to hard times in the area, many people could not afford to buy land. If someone made an agreement that the land would revert to him if they moved away, Captain Lively offered free land to anyone who wanted to build a house. Thus, the community became known as Free Home.
