= Nap Rucker =

American baseball player (1884-1970)

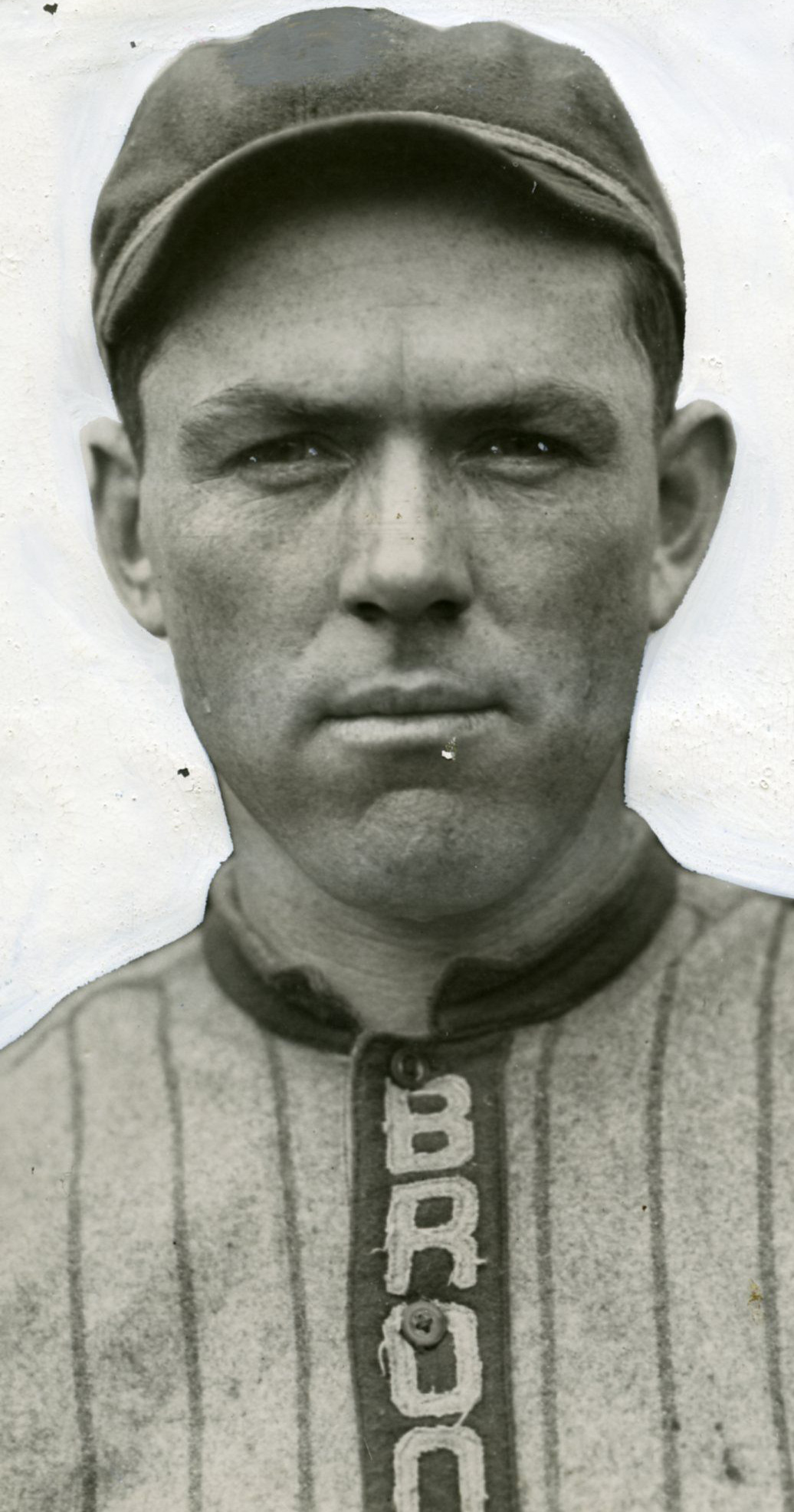
- Pitcher
- Born: September 30, 1884; Crabapple, Georgia, U.S.
- Died: December 19, 1970 (aged 86); Alpharetta, Georgia, U.S.
- Batted: Right Threw: Left

MLB debut
- April 15, 1907, for the Brooklyn Superbas

Last MLB appearance
- September 13, 1916, for the Brooklyn Robins

MLB statistics
- Win–loss record: 134–134
- Earned run average: 2.42
- Strikeouts: 1,217
- Stats at Baseball Reference

Teams
- Brooklyn Superbas / Dodgers / Robins (1907–1916)

Career highlights and awards
- Pitched a no-hitter on September 5, 1908

George Napoleon "Nap" Rucker (September 30, 1884 – December 19, 1970) was an American professional baseball pitcher and politician from Georgia. Rucker was a left-handed pitcher in Major League Baseball for the Brooklyn Superbas/Dodgers/Robins. Over his 10 seasons, Rucker led the league in shutouts, complete games, and innings pitched throughout his career. On September 5, 1908, Rucker became the first left-handed pitcher to throw a no-hitter in Dodger history.

== Early years ==
Rucker was born in Crabapple, Georgia, to parents Sarah Hembree and John Rucker, a Confederate veteran. He dropped out of school and became an apprentice printer. Inspired by a headline he worked on entitled "$10,000 For Pitching a Baseball", Rucker pursued a minor league career.

== Professional baseball ==
=== Minor league ===
In 1904. Rucker played with the Atlanta Crackers in the Southern Association. He then spent the following two years playing for the Augusta Tourists in the South Atlantic League and compiled a 40–20 win–loss record during that span. Rucker also roomed with Ty Cobb during his time with the Tourists.

=== Major league (1907–1916) ===
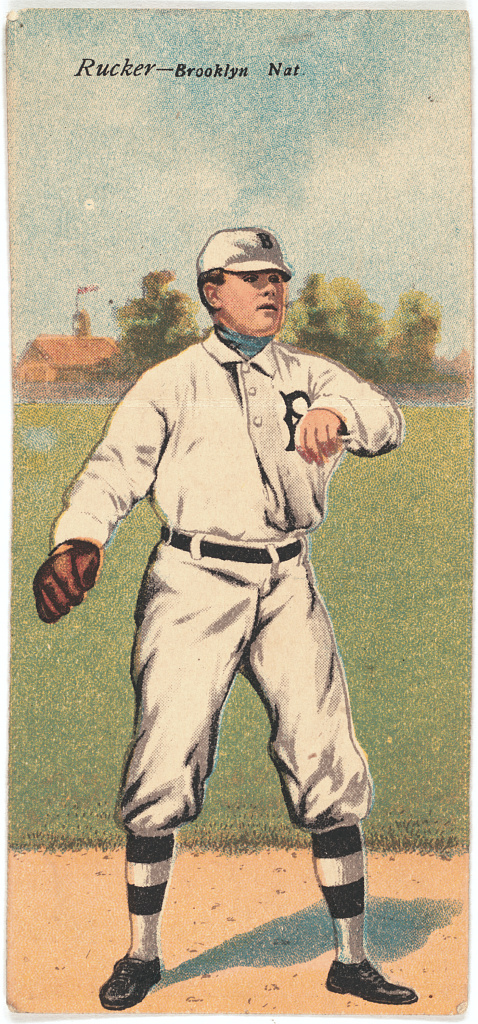
1911 baseball card

Rucker played for the Brooklyn Superbas for his entire major league career. Rucker threw a no-hitter against the Boston Doves on September 5, 1908. He led the National League in complete games (27), innings pitched (320.1), and shutouts (6) in 1910. His best year was 1911, when he won 22 games for the Dodgers. He holds the Brooklyn Dodgers record for the most shutouts in the National League (38); most strikeouts (16) in a regulation nine-inning game, and the most 1-0 shutouts (3) in a 154-game season. He became strictly a knuckleball pitcher when his speed declined.

=== Hall of Fame candidacy ===
In 1936, Rucker became eligible for the National Baseball Hall of Fame. As a player who received more than 5.0% of votes cast, Rucker remained eligible for induction by the Baseball Writers' Association of America until 1946, when his time on the ballot expired after 10 unsuccessful appearances. His highest percentage of votes earned came in his final year on the ballot, receiving 6.4% of the vote in 1946.

Following his unsuccessful nominations, Yankees Hall of Fame manager, Casey Stengel, said about Rucker, "If it hadn't been for Nap, I reckon I wouldn't be manager of the Yankees now. I wouldn't have even stayed in baseball."

== Later life: Mayor of Roswell ==
Rucker was born in Crabapple, Georgia. After his baseball career, Rucker went on to a successful business career including investing in a local bank and ownership of a plantation, several cotton farms, a wheat mill. He also served as mayor of Roswell from 1935 to 1936. After serving as mayor. Rucker was responsible for creating Roswell's first supply of running water and served as the city's water commissioner for many years. Rucker was inducted into the Georgia Sports Hall of Fame in 1967. Rucker died in Alpharetta, Georgia, in 1970 and was interred in the Roswell Presbyterian Church Cemetery in Roswell, Georgia. He made a lasting impact on the town of Roswell and the people to come after him.

== Personal life ==
His nephew Johnny Rucker played baseball for the New York Giants.

== See also ==
- List of Major League Baseball no-hitters
- List of Major League Baseball players who spent their entire career with one franchise

Preceded by Elmer Stricklett; Kaiser Wilhelm; Cy Barger	Brooklyn Superbas/Dodgers Opening Day; Starting pitcher 1908; 1910; 1912–1913	Succeeded by Kaiser Wilhelm; Cy Barger; Ed Reulbach
Preceded by Hooks Wiltse	No-hitter pitcher September 5, 1908	Succeeded by Bob Rhoads
