= Gregory Polanco =

Dominican baseball player (born 1991)

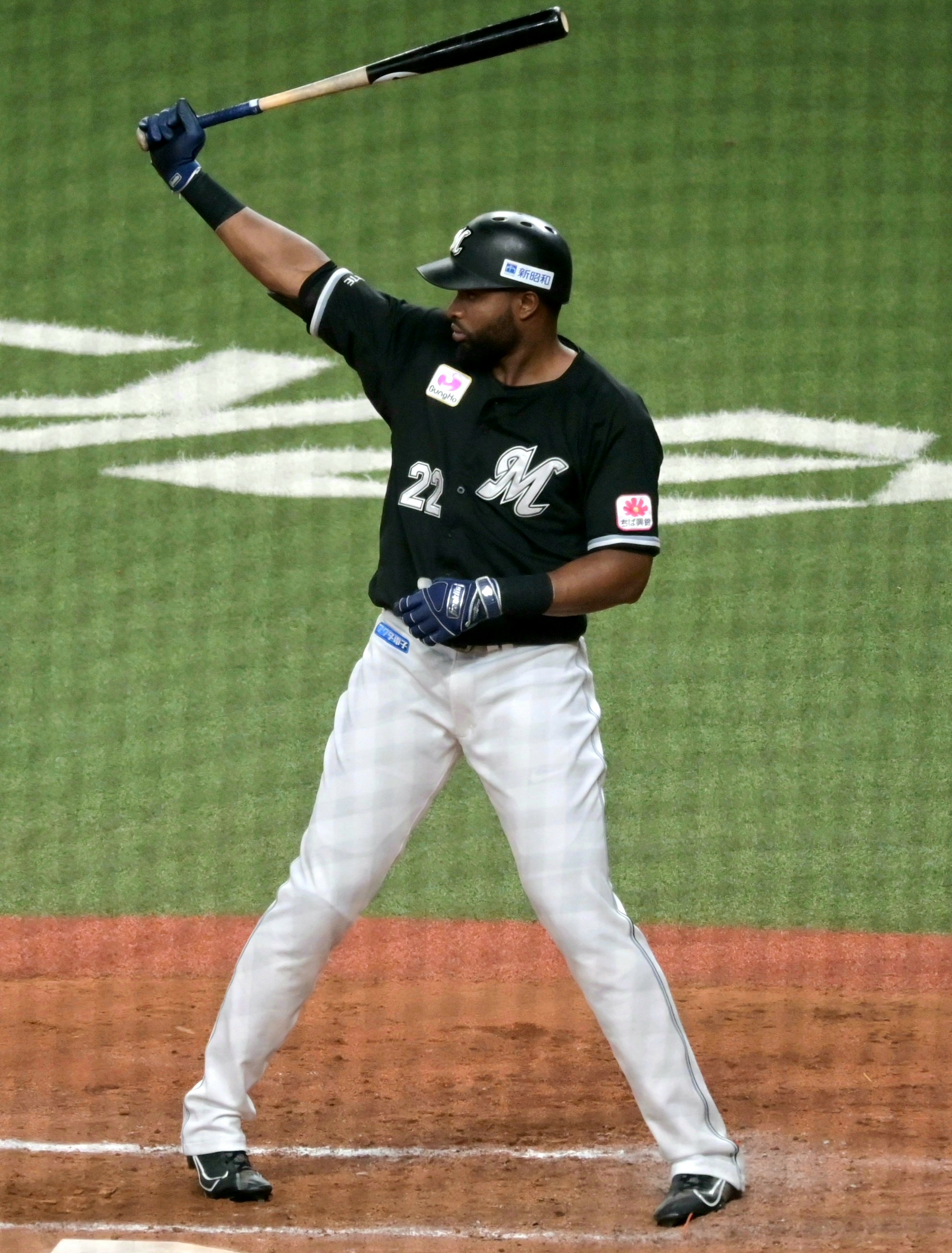
- Polanco with the Chiba Lotte Marines in 2023

Leones del Escogido – No. 25
- Right fielder
- Born: September 14, 1991 (age 35); Santo Domingo, Dominican Republic
- Bats: Left Throws: Left

Professional debut
- MLB: June 10, 2014, for the Pittsburgh Pirates
- NPB: March 25, 2022, for the Yomiuri Giants

MLB statistics (through 2021 season)
- Batting average: .241
- Home runs: 96
- Runs batted in: 362
- Stolen bases: 98

NPB statistics (through 2026 season)
- Batting average: .233
- Home runs: 83
- Runs batted in: 220
- Stats at Baseball Reference

Teams
- Pittsburgh Pirates (2014–2021); Yomiuri Giants (2022); Chiba Lotte Marines (2023–2026)

Career highlights and awards
- NPB All-Star (2024)

Gregory Polanco (born September 14, 1991), nicknamed "El Coffee", is a Dominican professional baseball right fielder who is a free agent. He has previously played in Major League Baseball (MLB) for the Pittsburgh Pirates and in Nippon Professional Baseball (NPB) for the Yomiuri Giants and Chiba Lotte Marines.

== Professional career ==
=== Minor leagues (2009–2014) ===
Polanco competed in showcases, and played as a pitcher due to his being left-handed. He was asked to rotate to the outfield due to a shortage of players, and found that he preferred the position. Polanco signed as an international free agent with the Pirates on April 11, 2009.

In 2009, he played for the Dominican Pirates of the Rookie-level Dominican Summer League. In 2010, he played for the Gulf Coast Pirates of the Rookie-level Gulf Coast League (GCL), where he had a .202 batting average. In 2011, he played for the GCL Pirates and the State College Spikes, batting .237. He spent the 2012 season with the West Virginia Power of the Class A South Atlantic League. He enjoyed his best season to date, batting .325 with 16 home runs and 40 stolen bases. He was named the South Atlantic League player of the year, and the Pirates' minor league player of the year.

Prior to the 2013 season, Polanco was ranked as the 65th best prospect in baseball by MLB.com, and as the 51st best prospect in baseball by Baseball America. Polanco began the 2013 season with the Bradenton Marauders of the Class A-Advanced Florida State League. With Bradenton, Polanco batted .312 with 24 stolen bases and 30 runs batted in (RBIs) in 57 games, before receiving a promotion to the Altoona Curve of the Class AA Eastern League. In June 2013, Baseball Prospectus ranked Polanco as the 12th best prospect in baseball. Polanco, along with Dilson Herrera, represented the Pirates at the 2013 All-Star Futures Game. The Pirates promoted Polanco to the Indianapolis Indians of the Class AAA International League at the end of the season. He received nine at-bats with Indianapolis.

The Pirates added Polanco to their 40-man roster on November 20, 2013, to protect him from being selected by another team in the Rule 5 Draft. On March 14, 2014, the Pirates optioned Polanco to Indianapolis.

=== Pittsburgh Pirates (2014–2021) ===
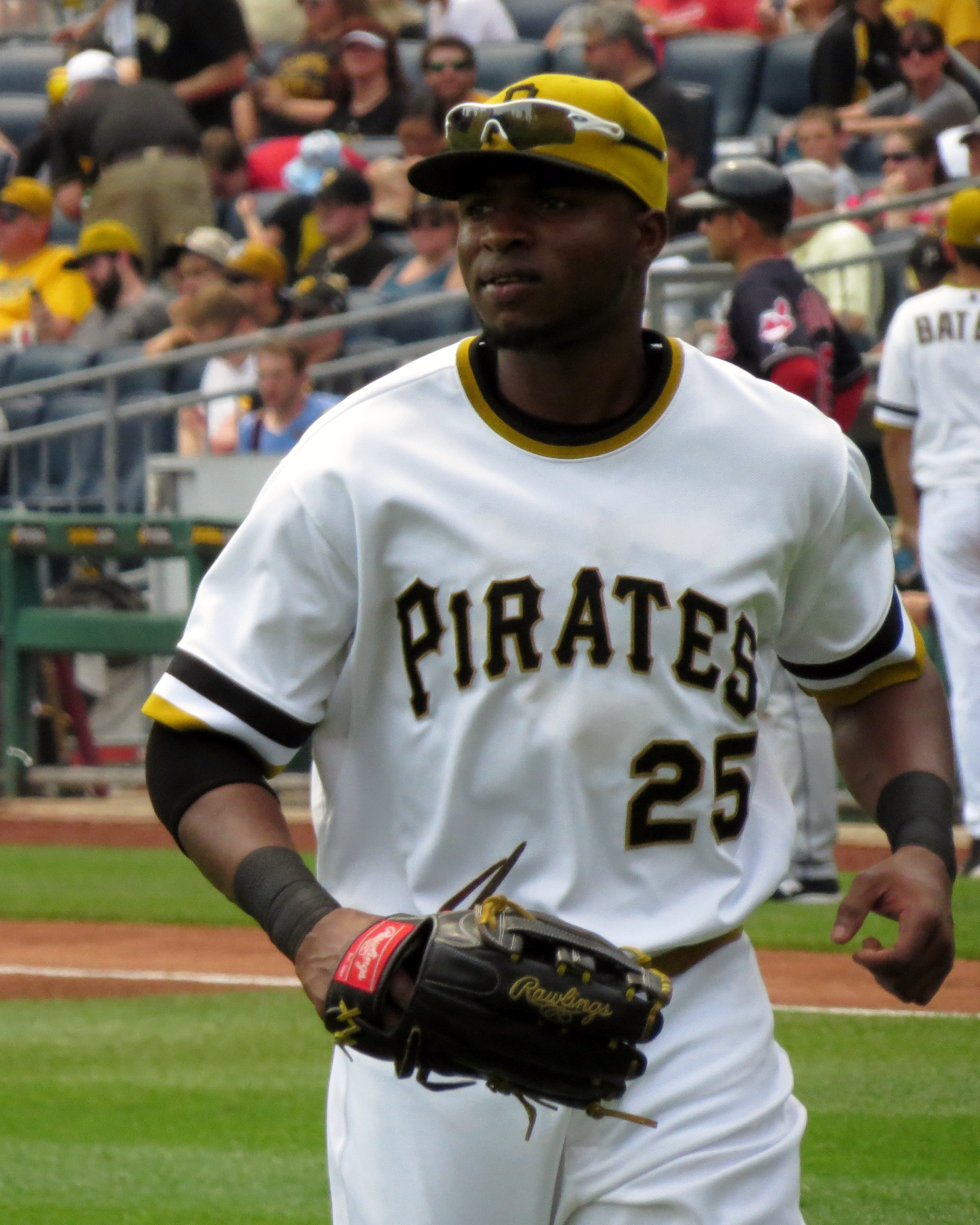
Polanco at PNC Park in 2015

Polanco was called up to MLB on June 9, 2014, due to an appendix injury to second baseman Neil Walker and made his MLB debut on June 10 playing right field. In that game, he recorded his first career MLB hit against Chicago Cubs pitcher Travis Wood, later scoring his first career MLB run. The following day, June 11, Polanco recorded his first career MLB RBI. On June 13, as part of a five-hit game, Polanco hit his first career MLB home run, a two-run shot, against the Miami Marlins in the 13th inning that would turn out to be the game winner in an 8–6 victory for the Pirates. On June 17, he became the third Pirates player—the first since Roberto Clemente in 1955—to record a hit in each of his first seven MLB appearances. The following day, he became the first Pirate to hit in his first eight games. Polanco struggled for a month after a good start to his career, and was optioned to Triple-A Indianapolis on August 25 before returning a week later as part of the expanded roster at the beginning of September.

On April 5, 2016, the Pittsburgh Pirates announced they had reached an agreement with Polanco and his agent Rafa Nieves on a $35 million contract extension. Polanco finished 2016 with 34 doubles, 22 home runs and 86 RBI.

On May 17, 2017, Polanco was placed on the 10-day disabled list due to a strained left hamstring. The transaction was retroactive two days prior to the announcement.

On September 12, 2018, Polanco underwent surgery on his dislocated shoulder and missed the remainder of the season. At the time of his injury, Polanco had batted .251/.340/.499 with a career-high 23 home runs in 130 games.

Polanco began the 2019 season on the injured list before returning to the Pirates in May. He slashed .242/.301/.425 in 42 games before landing on the injured list again. On July 17, 2019, his rehab progress was halted due to continued shoulder discomfort and he was eventually shut down for the rest of the 2019 season.

On July 17, 2020, it was announced that Polanco had tested positive for COVID-19. In the pandemic shortened 2020 season, Polanco slashed .153/.214/.325 with 65 strikeouts in 157 at-bats, while placing second in team home runs (7) and RBI (22).

Polanco appeared in 107 games in 2021 for the Pirates, hitting .208 with 11 home runs and 36 RBIs. On August 22, 2021, Polanco was designated for assignment by the Pirates to allow him to play for a contender. However, Polanco cleared waivers and was re-selected to the roster. On August 28, the Pirates released Polanco.

Over his eight seasons in Pittsburgh, Polanco appeared in 823 games, hitting .241 with 96 home runs and 362 RBIs, while also stealing 98 bases.

=== Toronto Blue Jays (2021) ===
On August 31, 2021, Polanco signed a minor league contract with the Toronto Blue Jays. Polanco played in 24 games for the Triple-A Buffalo Bisons, hitting .374 with nine home runs and 24 RBIs. Polanco became a free agent following the season.

=== Yomiuri Giants ===
On January 5, 2022, Polanco signed with the Yomiuri Giants of Nippon Professional Baseball.

=== Chiba Lotte Marines ===
On December 27, 2022, Polanco signed with the Chiba Lotte Marines of Nippon Professional Baseball. On October 12, 2026, the Marines announced they would not be re-signing Polanco for the 2027 season making him a free agent.

== World Baseball Classic ==
He played in the 2017 World Baseball Classic, and following the conclusion of the tournament, he was named to the 2017 All-World Baseball Classic team.

== Personal life ==
Polanco is from Villa Mella, Santo Domingo, where both of his parents are police officers. Polanco began dating Africa Rodriguez in 2019. Polanco and Rodriguez have one child, a boy, born March 2021.
