= Johnny Rucker =

American baseball player (1917-1985)

- Center fielder
- Born: January 15, 1917; Crabapple, Georgia, U.S.
- Died: August 7, 1985 (aged 68); Moultrie, Georgia, U.S.
- Batted: Left Threw: Right

MLB debut
- April 16, 1940, for the New York Giants

Last MLB appearance
- September 29, 1946, for the New York Giants

MLB statistics
- Batting average: .272
- Home runs: 21
- Runs batted in: 214
- Stats at Baseball Reference

Teams
- New York Giants (1940–1941; 1943–1946)

John Joel Rucker (January 15, 1917 – August 7, 1985), nicknamed "the Crabapple Comet," was an American professional baseball player, an outfielder who appeared in 705 Major League Baseball games played, 607 as a center fielder, over six seasons (1940–1941; 1943–1946) for the New York Giants. The native of Crabapple, Georgia — a nephew of former Major League pitcher Nap Rucker — batted left-handed, threw right-handed, stood 6 feet 2 inches (1.88 m) tall and weighed 175 pounds (79 kg). He attended the University of Georgia. When he joined the Giants in 1940, he was enthusiastically hailed by the ballclub as "the new Ty Cobb," as the ballclub hoped he would be just as much of a star as the Hall of Famer from Georgia.

Until broken by Pablo Sandoval in 2012, Rucker's 17-game hitting streak to start the 1945 campaign was the Giants' franchise record for a hitting streak to begin a season. The skein lasted from April 17 through May 9, and Rucker batted .333 with 28 hits in 84 at bats, with six doubles and two home runs. It was halted on May 11, 1945, by Frank Dasso of the Cincinnati Reds. During his MLB career, Rucker amassed 711 hits, including 105 doubles and 39 triples.

Rucker's professional career extended from 1938 to 1952, although he sat out the 1951 season.

Rucker is featured on the cover of the April 1, 1940 issue of Life magazine.
