= Crabapple, Georgia =

Human settlement in Fulton County, Georgia, US

Coordinates: 34°05′24″N 84°20′19″W

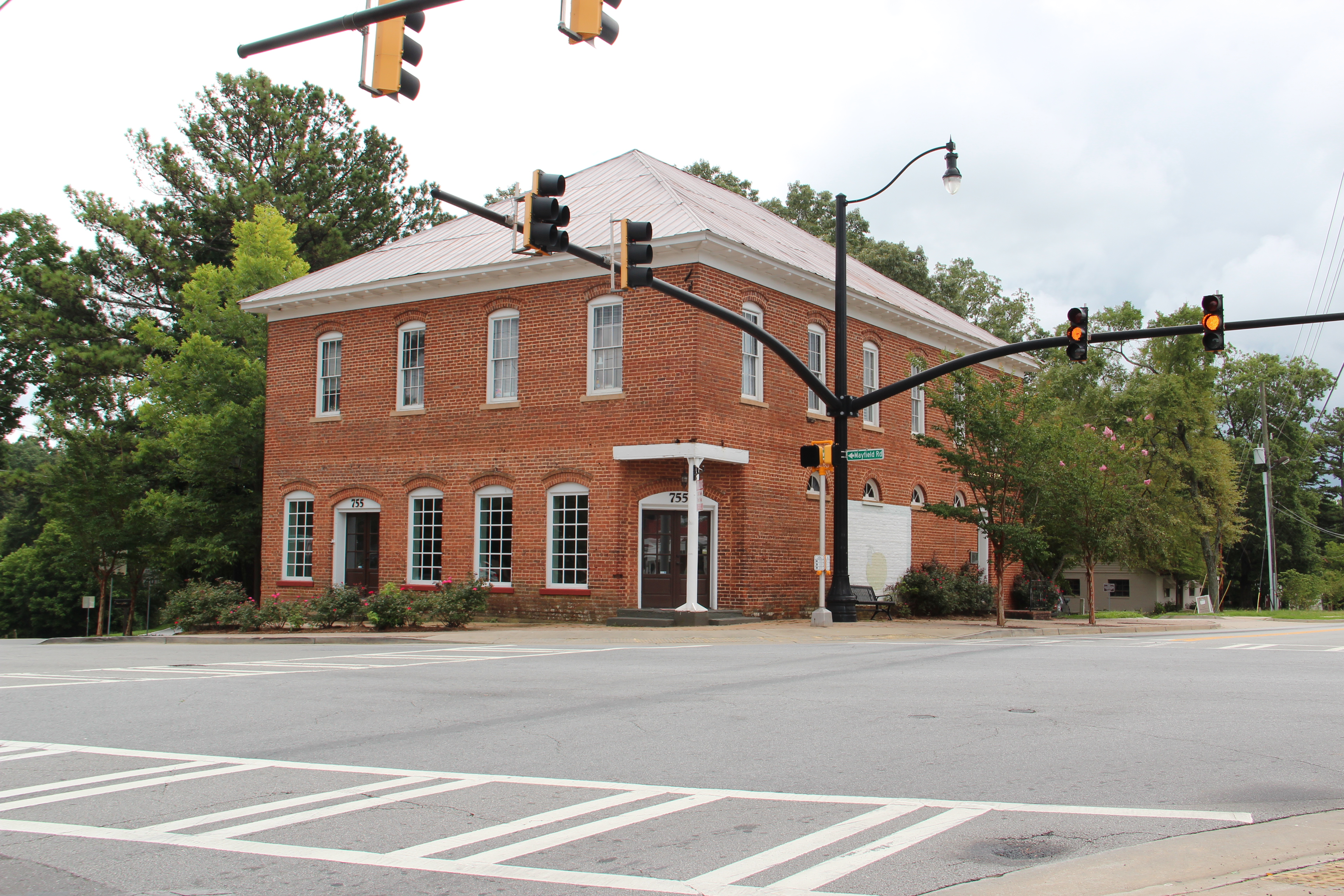
Crabapple, Georgia.

Centered today at the crossroads of Georgia Highways 140 and 372 (also known as "the Silos area"), Crabapple, Georgia, is one of the oldest parts of Fulton County, Georgia. Originally part of Cherokee County, Georgia, (created 1832), Crabapple was part of the land contributed in 1857 to form Milton County, Georgia. The first permanent settlement at Crabapple was made in 1874, with the community taking its name from a crabapple tree near the original town site. As a result of the Great Depression, Milton County was later absorbed into Fulton County in 1932. The historic heart of Crabapple is anchored by an historic brick building at the crossroads of Crabapple Road-Mayfield Road, Birmingham Road-Broadwell Road, and Mid-Broadwell Road. In 2006, a portion of Crabapple was one of several communities incorporated into the new city of Milton. Crabapple is now split between the cities of Milton, Roswell, and Alpharetta.

Crabapple hosts an antique fair twice yearly (May and October) called the Old Times at Crabapple Antique Festival.

== Notable people ==
- Nap Rucker, was a Major League Baseball pitcher for the Brooklyn Dodgers and politician who served as mayor of Roswell.
- Johnny Rucker, nicknamed "The Crabapple Comet", was an American professional baseball player for the New York Giants.

== Geography ==
=== Major highways ===
- State Route 140
- State Route 372
