= Georgia State Route 372 =

State highway in Georgia, United States

State Route 372
- SR 372 highlighted in red

Route information
- Maintained by GDOT
- Length: 27.128 mi (43.658 km)

Major junctions
- South end: SR 140 in Alpharetta
- North end: I-575 / SR 5 / SR 515 just west of Nelson

Location
- Country: United States
- State: Georgia
- Counties: Fulton, Cherokee, Pickens

Highway system
- Georgia State Highway System; Interstate; US; State; Special
← SR 371	→ SR 374

State Route 372 (SR 372) is a 27.128-mile-long (43.658 km) state highway in the north-central part of the U.S. state of Georgia. It begins at an intersection with SR 140 in the western part of Alpharetta, Georgia and travels to the north through Fulton and Cherokee counties to end at I-575/SR 5/SR 515 in the very southern portion of south-central Pickens County.

== Route description ==
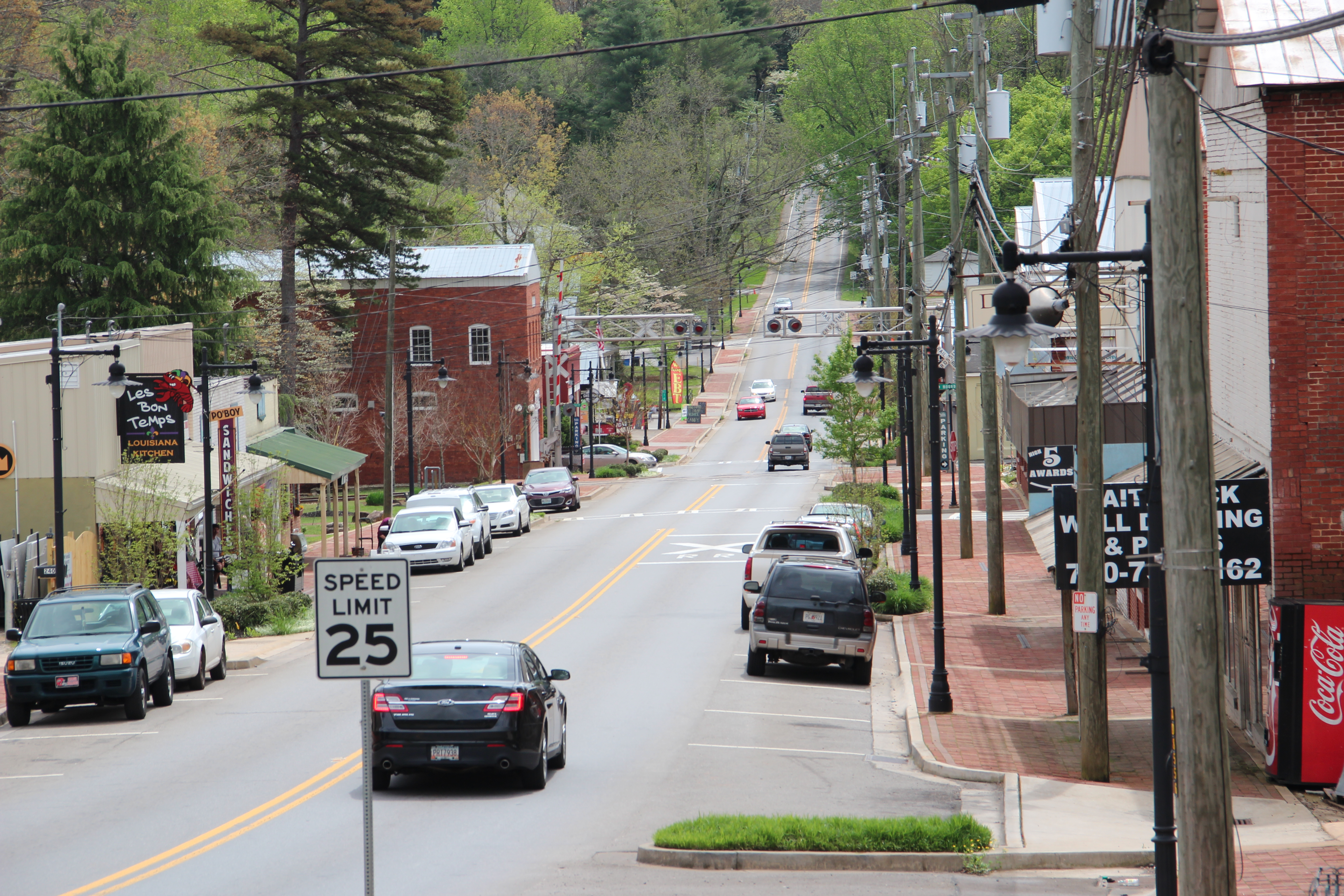
SR 372 in Ball Ground.

SR 372 begins at an intersection with SR 140, locally known as Arnold Mill Road, in Crabapple area of western Alpharetta, a predominately residential area of north Fulton County. After initially heading east, the route turns directly north, changes names from Crabapple Road to Birmingham Highway (named after the small community the route travels through on its way north out of Alpharetta), and heads into the western portions of Milton. SR 372 then angles slightly northeast, and briefly changes names to Birmingham Road as it crosses into Cherokee County, before making a sharp turn to the north and traveling through the unincorporated communities of Free Home and Lathemtown, now locally known as Ball Ground Road. After crossing SR 20 in Free Home and SR 369 about 3 miles (4.8 km) thereafter, the route turns to the northwest and continues into Ball Ground.

In Ball Ground, SR 372 intersects SR 5 Business, which terminates at this intersection, and travels north in the direction of Nelson. Just south of Nelson, the route turns to the northwest once more and feeds into I-575/SR 5/SR 515, its northern terminus, just after crossing into Pickens County, where SR 5/SR 515 curve to the northwest just west of downtown Nelson, and just after the end of the freeway.

=== Traffic ===
The Georgia Department of Transportation average annual daily traffic (AADT) numbers for the year 2011 show some variety in the average daily traffic load numbers as the route travels north. The traffic load averages start at their high point on the route, with an average of 16,530 vehicles using the short stretch between SR 140 and the start of the Birmingham Highway portion. Those numbers then steadily decrease as SR 372 heads north, going from 9,390 initially down to just over 3,000 as Cherokee County approaches. The average load stays between 3,000 and 3,500 south of SR 20, climbs to 5,500 north of SR 20, and goes up once more to around 6,200 north of SR 369. The area south of, and into, Ball Ground sees an average vehicle load of between 7,000 and 7,500, cresting once more at 8,680 heading north out of downtown towards I-575/SR 5/SR 515. However, the short stretch that feeds directly into the aforementioned state route only carries 3,900 vehicles per day, illustrating that the feeder route into SR 5 south of Ball Ground sees heavier traffic than this northern spur.

== History ==
The first indications of a roadway following today's routing of SR 372 makes its appearance on Georgia state road maps in 1953, when the portion of the route in Fulton County appears on state maps as a county route, and which connected in the community of Birmingham with today's New Bullpen Road and then Union Hill Road to meet SR 20 east of Canton. By 1966, the Fulton County portion was unchanged, but the portion of today's route from Free Home to Ball Ground and SR 5 had been added as a connecting county route. It was 1969 before the entirety of the route had been mapped as connecting routes on Georgia state highway maps; however, no state route designation was extant at the time.

Another three years later, the routing as it travels today, through Ball Ground to what is signed as SR 5 Business, was designated as SR 372; the northernmost portion of the route, connecting to what is I-575/SR 5/SR 515 today (which bypasses Ball Ground to its west), was still signed as SR 5 at the time. It was early 1987 before this final stretch of SR 372 was added to its designation and removed from a designation of SR 5 Alternate.

== Major intersections ==
County	Location	mi	km	Destinations	Notes
Fulton	Alpharetta	0.000	0.000	SR 140 (Arnold Mill Road) – Roswell, Canton	Southern terminus
Cherokee	Free Home	13.403	21.570	SR 20 (Cumming Highway) – Canton, Cumming	
Cherokee		16.342	26.300	SR 369 (Hightower Road)	
Cherokee	Ball Ground	23.275	37.457	SR 5 Bus. south (Canton Highway)	East end of SR 5 Bus. concurrency
Pickens	Nelson	27.128	43.658	I-575 south (SR 417 south) / SR 5 (Appalachian Highway) / SR 515 north (Zell Miller Mountain Parkway north) / SR 5 Bus. ends – Canton, Jasper	Northern terminus of I-575/SR 5 Bus./SR 372; southern terminus of SR 515 and Zell Miller Mountain Parkway; west end of SR 5 Bus. concurrency; SR 5 Bus. and SR 372 northbound has no access to I-575 and SR 5 southbound
1.000 mi = 1.609 km; 1.000 km = 0.621 mi: Concurrency terminus; Incomplete access
