= Rafa Nieves =

Certified sports agent

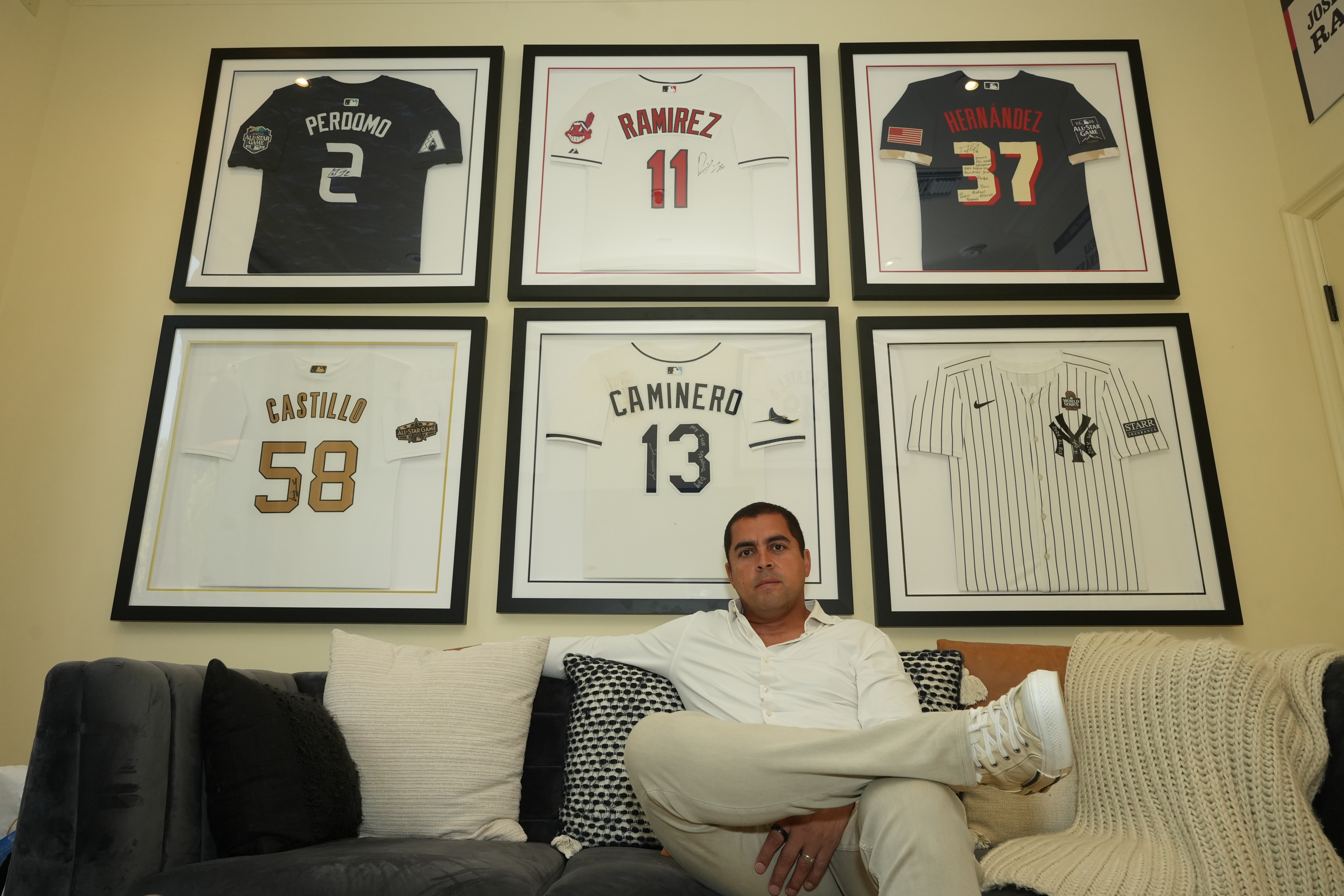
- Born: August 1, 1983 (age 42); Caracas, Venezuela
- Occupation: Sports Agent
- Employer: Republik Sports

Rafa Nieves (born August 1, 1983) is an MLBPA certified sports agent and founder of Republik Sports. Nieves represents many baseball players including José Ramírez (Guardians), Francisco Cervelli (Retired), Víctor Robles (Mariners), Luis Gil (Yankees), Luis Castillo (Mariners), Teoscar Hernandez (Dodgers), Antonio Senzatela (Rockies), Junior Caminero (Rays) and Geraldo Perdomo (Diamondbacks) among many others.

== Career ==
Originally from Venezuela, Nieves moved to the United States at the age of 16 when he was signed by then Detroit Tigers' scout Ramon Peña. He would then go on to play for the New York Yankees organization for one year where he later became a free agent and eventually retired. Following his baseball career, Nieves began working at Beverly Hills Sports Council in 2011 and soon after helped create the Latin Division of the agency, which focuses on Latin American clients. Nieves’ personal experience and ability to speak both English and Spanish fluently allows him to relate to the unique transition the Latin players experience.

=== 2015 ===
In 2015, Nieves represented Cuban star pitcher Yadier Alvarez. Alvarez, who possessed a fastball that reached 99 mph, signed a professional contract with the Los Angeles Dodgers on July 2, 2015, with a record-breaking $16 million signing bonus for an amateur pitcher.

=== 2016 ===
In 2016, Nieves was instrumental on the Salvador Pérez $52.5 million contract extension with the Kansas City Royals and he also negotiated Gregory Polanco's $35 million contract extension with the Pittsburgh Pirates making it the first big offseason of his career.

On May 17, 2016, the Pittsburgh Pirates announced a 3-year $31 million contract extension with Francisco Cervelli. That same day, Cervelli wrote a story for The Players' Tribune announcing his contract and thanked his agent Rafa Nieves.

=== 2017 ===
Nieves started representing Brazilian right-handed pitcher Eric Pardinho in January 2017. Pardinho, tabbed by MLB.com as "the new face of baseball in Brazil", represented his home country in the World Baseball Classic qualifier in 2016, and was clocked at 94 mph when he was only 15 years of age.

On March 24, 2017, Jeff Passan from Yahoo! Sports announced the Cleveland Indians had agreed to a 4-year extension with José Ramírez for upward of $30 million. The next day, It was reported that the deal had been in the works for a month between the Indians and Nieves. Nieves was quoted by The Plain Dealer saying "To me this is a celebration because José was a project who came out nowhere for everyone. This is a successful story for everyone - from Jose's family to the Indians' front office and player development department and to our agency."

The next day, on March 25, 2017 The Dallas Morning News announced the Texas Rangers were nearing a contract extension with Rougned Odor, another Beverly Hills Sports Council client. The newspaper reported that "the expected six-year deal in the $50-52 million range may only be lacking formalities."

On June 15, powerhouse agency Wasserman Media Group announced that Rafa Nieves had been hired as Vice President of Baseball.

=== 2020 ===
On March 28, 2020, Nieves left Wasserman Media Group, and announced the formation of a new firm called Republik Sports.

== MLB All-Star Clients ==
- Luis Castillo
- Kelvin Herrera
- José Ramírez
- Teoscar Hernandez
- Geraldo Perdomo
- Junior Caminero
- Alex Colome
