= Milton, Georgia =

City in Fulton County, Georgia, United States

- City
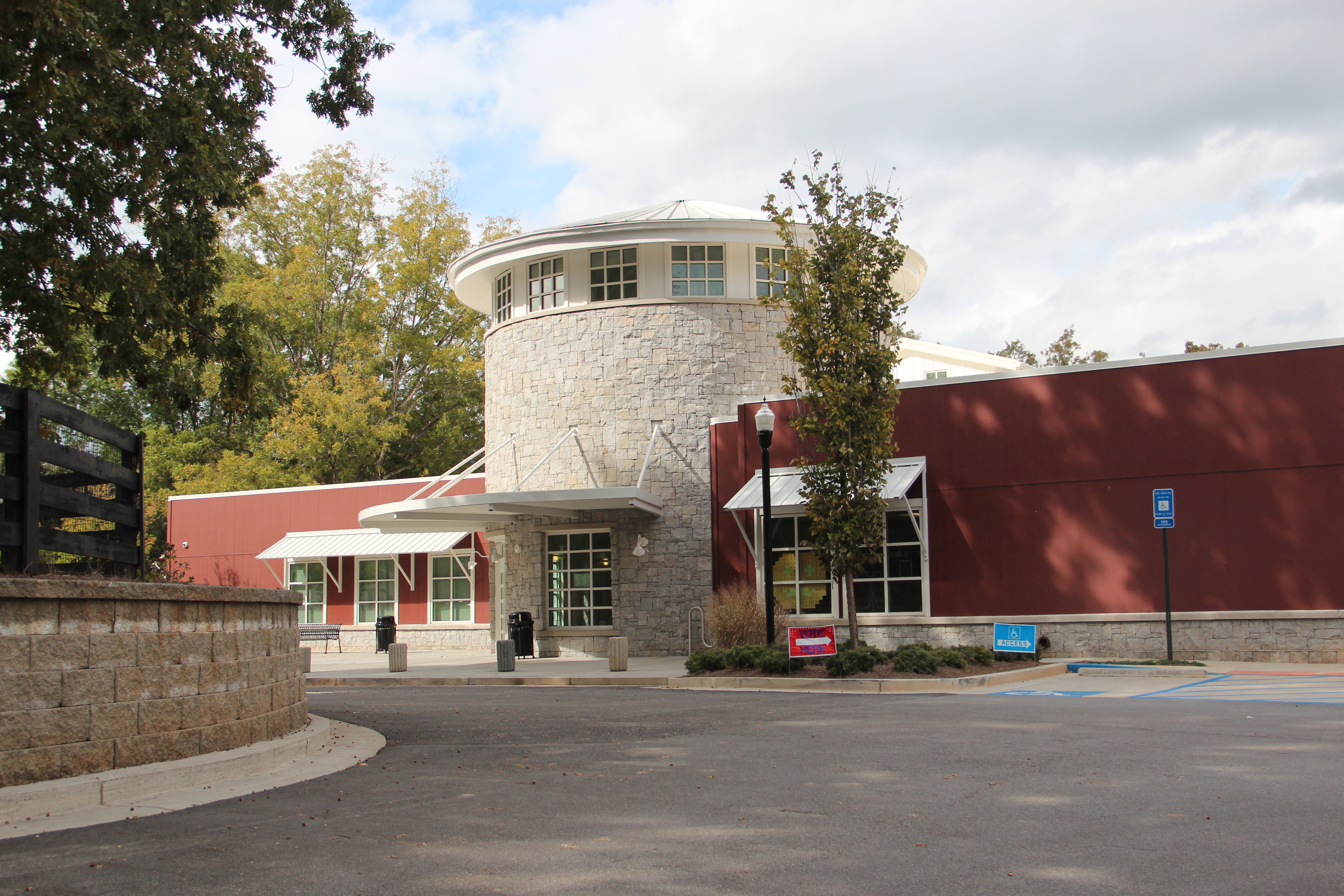
- Milton Public Library

- Flag Seal Logo
- Motto: "Named best quality of life in Georgia"
- Interactive map of Milton, Georgia
- Coordinates: 34°07′56″N 84°18′02″W
- Country: United States
- State: Georgia
- County: Fulton
- Incorporated: December 1, 2006

Government
  - Mayor: Peyton Jamison

Area
  - Total: 39.11 sq mi (101.29 km^{2})
  - Land: 38.50 sq mi (99.72 km^{2})
  - Water: 0.60 sq mi (1.56 km^{2}) 1.6%
- Elevation: 942 ft (287 m)

Population (2020)
  - Total: 41,296
  - Density: 1,073/sq mi (414.1/km^{2})
- Time zone: UTC-5 (EST)
  - Summer (DST): UTC-4 (EDT)
- ZIP codes: 30004, 30009
- Area codes: 770, 678
- FIPS code: 13-51670
- GNIS feature ID: 2404269
- Website: miltonga.gov

Milton is a city in Fulton County, Georgia, United States, located about 30 miles (48 km) north of downtown Atlanta. Incorporated on December 1, 2006, the population was 41,296 as of the 2020 census.

The city is named after Revolutionary War hero John Milton, who is also the namesake of the former Milton County that included modern-day Milton between 1857 and 1931. With over 39 square miles of land, much of it agriculturally zoned, Milton is characterized by its rural and equestrian heritage, spacious residential lots, and a small-town feel combined with the amenities of a metropolitan area. It is bordered by Cherokee and Forsyth counties, as well as the cities of Roswell and Alpharetta.

== History ==
=== Early inhabitants and European settlement (1000-1832) ===
The lands of what is now Milton, Georgia, were once the domain of the Cherokee Nation, whose presence in Georgia dates back over 10,000 years. This indigenous group, speaking an Iroquoian language, cultivated a society with a strong kinship system, with their social life revolving around village structures, ceremonial mounds, and agricultural practices, notably corn farming. The arrival of European settlers from coastal Georgia, the Carolinas, and beyond brought new dynamics to the region. These early settlers engaged in trade with the Cherokee and, at times, intermarried, creating a blended frontier society. However, the relationship between the two groups became increasingly strained due to escalating demands for land by state and federal governments, a situation exacerbated by the discovery of gold in nearby Dahlonega in 1828. The subsequent desire for land acquisition led to the tragic Trail of Tears in 1832, mandated by President Andrew Jackson, which forcibly removed the Cherokee from Georgia to designated territories in present-day Oklahoma.

=== Agrarian beginnings and Milton County (1832–1932) ===
Following the Cherokee removal, the State of Georgia implemented a land lottery system, with the final lottery in 1832 involving the territory that would become Milton. Settlers drawn by the prospect of land ownership began to populate the area, converting the dense forests into farmland and pastures. The agricultural landscape was dotted with small subsistence farms and a few larger plantations, with cotton emerging as a significant cash crop alongside the production of fruits, vegetables, and livestock. The community's roots deepened with the establishment of Milton County in 1857, named after John Milton, an American Revolutionary War hero and politician. Despite the county's initial opposition to secession, the broader state sentiment led Georgia into the Civil War, profoundly affecting the local population.

=== 20th century ===
At the turn of the 20th century, the area remained mostly forested and agricultural – the exception being small villages and crossroads with general stores and trading posts, mills and gins, churches, a few schools, and inns at the intersections of horse and carriage routes. While fruits and vegetables were grown, and cattle and pig farms existed, many people continued to raise cotton as a cash crop. The advent of the automobile and the establishment of Highway 9 in the 1920s began to bridge the distance between Milton and the expanding world beyond its borders. Despite these connections, the county faced insurmountable financial pressures from the Great Depression, the boll weevil infestation, and a prolonged drought. These challenges led to the dissolution of Milton County in 1932, with its territory being absorbed into Fulton County.

The area retained its rural character for decades, even as the rest of North Georgia, particularly Atlanta, experienced explosive growth. People in the area tended to keep the same types of jobs, agriculture, and daily schedules as they had before the counties merged. Homes tended to be few and far between, racial segregation remained a reality, and the community revolved largely around churches, schools, and gathering spots like general stores and baseball diamonds.

However, as Atlanta's population tripled between 1910 and 1960 and more roads were built and paved, people began settling further from Georgia's capital city. The construction of State Route 400 and other infrastructure projects gradually brought more residents and development to the region, yet Milton managed to preserve its pastoral identity, in part due to zoning that favored larger, septic-dependent lots conducive to horse farms and rural living.

=== 21st century ===
After the turn of the 21st century, a movement for local governance emerged, driven by the belief that the needs of the northernmost part of Fulton County were not adequately prioritized by distant county officials. The legislative process to establish a city began in earnest when Georgia State Representative Jan Jones introduced the bill for the city of Milton in January 2005 with the intent of moving the bill forward in January 2006. This gave residents one full year to consider all the ramifications of cityhood before the bill could become law. A City of Milton Citizens' Committee helped coordinate information and research.

On March 9, 2006, the bill establishing the new city of Milton (HB 1470) resoundingly passed both in the Georgia House of Representatives (127–21) and in the Georgia State Senate (49–0). At 2 p.m. on Wednesday, March 28, Governor Sonny Perdue signed the bill into law. A ballot referendum was approved by 85 percent of voters on July 18 to create the city of Milton.

On August 4, Governor Perdue appointed a five-person commission to serve as the interim government of Milton (composed of Ron Wallace, Brandon Beach, Gregory Mishkin, Dan Phalan and Cecil Pruitt). The city's first general election for Mayor and City Council was held on Tuesday, November 7, 2006. Joe Lockwood won the first mayoral election. The city of Milton was officially incorporated and adopted Fulton County's existing ordinances on December 1, 2006.

Working initially out of converted commercial office spaces, city leaders began forging Milton's unique identity as it transitioned to local governance. Plans were set in motion to launch Milton's own police services on May 1, 2007, and fire department 16 days later. At the same time, city officials created the city code, developed community programs, conducted community events, and moved into city-owned properties, including a newly built city hall (opened 2017) and its Public Safety Complex (opened 2020).

Joe Lockwood served as mayor for Milton's first 15 years, succeeded by Peyton Jamison. Milton is also led by city managers who oversee all municipal operations as well as the effective, efficient execution and enforcement of city laws and ordinances.

While Milton's government evolved, the city's population grew. The U.S. Census measured Milton's population at 32,661 in 2010; ten years later, the Census counted 41,296 residents — a more than 26% increase.

== Geography ==
Milton occupies the northern tip of Fulton County, bounded on the south by the cities of Roswell and Alpharetta, on the east by Forsyth County and Alpharetta, and on the north and west by Cherokee County. The city's latest Comprehensive Plan divides Milton into eight "character areas": they are Arnold Mill, Bethany, Birmingham, Central Milton, Crabapple, Deerfield, Milton Lakes and Sweetapple.

The two major north–south roads that run through Milton are State Route 9 (in the city's southeast) and State Route 372 (more central), which is also known as Birmingham Highway. State Route 140 (Arnold Mill Road) is on the southwest part of Milton.

According to the U.S. Census Bureau, the city of Milton has a total area of 39.2 square miles (101.4 km^{2}), of which 38.5 square miles (99.8 km^{2}) is land and 0.62 square miles (1.6 km^{2}), or 1.59%, is water. The elevation ranges from 950 to 1,280 feet (290 to 390 m) above sea level.

As of April 2007, the US Postal Service recognizes Milton as a valid alias for ZIP code 30004, which is served from the Alpharetta post office.

== Demographics ==
Historical population
Census	Pop.	Note	%±
2010	32,661		—
2020	41,296		26.4%
2025 (est.)	41,266	▼	−0.1%
U.S. Decennial Census; 2025

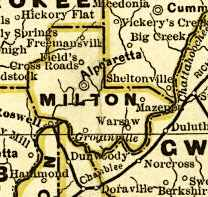
1883 map of Milton County

=== Racial and ethnic composition ===
Milton city, Georgia – Racial and ethnic composition Note: the US Census treats Hispanic/Latino as an ethnic category. This table excludes Latinos from the racial categories and assigns them to a separate category. Hispanics/Latinos may be of any race.
Race / Ethnicity (NH = Non-Hispanic)	Pop 2010	Pop 2020	% 2010	% 2020
White alone (NH)	23,653	25,802	72.42%	62.48%
Black or African American alone (NH)	2,865	3,882	8.77%	9.40%
Native American or Alaska Native alone (NH)	59	74	0.18%	0.18%
Asian alone (NH)	3,380	6,446	10.35%	15.61%
Native Hawaiian or Pacific Islander alone (NH)	9	10	0.03%	0.02%
Other race alone (NH)	153	247	0.47%	0.60%
Mixed race or Multiracial (NH)	583	1,821	1.79%	4.41%
Hispanic or Latino (any race)	1,959	3,014	6.00%	7.30%
Total	32,661	41,296	100.00%	100.00%

=== 2020 census ===
As of the 2020 census, Milton had a population of 41,296, a more than 26% increase from the 32,661 recorded in 2010. The 2024 American Community Survey (ACS) estimated the population at 41,546. The median age was 40.1 years. At the 2020 census, 27.3% of residents were under the age of 18 and 8.8% were 65 years of age or older. For every 100 females, there were 96.1 males. Approximately 23.3% of residents were foreign-born, more than double the share in Georgia (11.2%) and well above the national rate of 14.1%.

There were 14,216 households and 10,366 families in Milton, of which 44.8% had children under the age of 18 living in them. Of all households, 64.9% were married-couple households, 12.6% were households with a male householder and no spouse or partner present, and 19.3% were households with a female householder and no spouse or partner present. About 18.2% of all households were made up of individuals and 4.3% had someone living alone who was 65 years of age or older.

There were 14,941 housing units, of which 4.9% were vacant. The homeowner vacancy rate was 1.7% and the rental vacancy rate was 8.0%.

98.2% of residents lived in urban areas, while 1.8% lived in rural areas.

Racial composition as of the 2020 census
Race	Number	Percent
White	26,376	63.9%
Black or African American	3,947	9.6%
American Indian and Alaska Native	115	0.3%
Asian	6,462	15.6%
Native Hawaiian and Other Pacific Islander	10	0.0%
Some other race	872	2.1%
Two or more races	3,514	8.5%
Hispanic or Latino (of any race)	3,014	7.3%

=== Income and affluence ===
Milton consistently ranks as one of the statistically wealthiest cities in the state of Georgia. Milton's affluence is reflected in its educational attainment with 77.9% of residents age 25 or older holding a bachelor's degree or higher, more than double the rate in Georgia (35.0%) and the United States (35.7%).

Among Georgia cities with populations between 10,000 and 50,000, Milton ranked first in median household income. According to 2024 American Community Survey (ACS) five-year estimates, the median household income in Milton was $171,295 – more than double the medians for Georgia ($77,353) and the United States ($80,734) – with a median household income of $218,476 for families. Mean household income was $244,049, rising to $280,929 for families. Per capita income in Milton was $88,928, roughly twice the national figure. The vast majority of Milton is part of the ZIP code 30004, which has a median household income of $136,124. Approximately 4.3% of the population lives below the poverty line, about one-third the national rate.

=== Housing ===
As of the 2024 ACS, Milton had 15,594 housing units and 15,225 households, with an average household size of 2.7 persons. 72.5% of Milton residents owned their home. The median value of owner-occupied housing units was $789,000, more than double the median values for Georgia ($303,300) and the United States ($332,700). Approximately 30.9% of homes were valued at $1,000,000 or greater, and 71.3% were valued above $500,000. The median home listing price as of June 2026 was $1,226,667.

== Government ==
The city is represented in the Georgia House of Representatives by Jan Jones of the 47th District and Chuck Martin of the 49th District: both Jones and Martin are Republicans. The city is represented in Georgia State Senate by Jason Dickerson of the 21st District a Republican and is represented in Fulton County Commission by Bob Ellis of District 2 a Republican.

== Education ==
=== Public schools ===
The city is served by Fulton County Schools.

==== Elementary schools ====
- Birmingham Falls Elementary School
- Cogburn Woods Elementary School
- Crabapple Crossing Elementary School
- Summit Hill Elementary School

==== Middle schools ====
- Hopewell Middle School
- Northwestern Middle School

==== High schools ====
- Cambridge High School
- Milton High School

=== Private schools ===
- Chandler Academy (K–8)
- King's Ridge Christian School (K–12)
- Mill Springs Academy (K–12)
- St. Francis Schools (K–12)

== Transportation ==
=== Major highways ===
- State Route 9
- State Route 140
- State Route 400
- State Route 372

=== Pedestrians and cycling ===
- Big Creek Greenway (Proposed)

== Notable people ==
- Dylan Cease (b. 1995), Major League Baseball (MLB) pitcher for the Toronto Blue Jays
- Brian Littrell (b. 1972), American singer and member of the Backstreet Boys
- Gary Rossington (1952–2023), guitarist, co-founder of Lynyrd Skynyrd
