= 1788–89 United States presidential election in Georgia =

- January 7, 1789
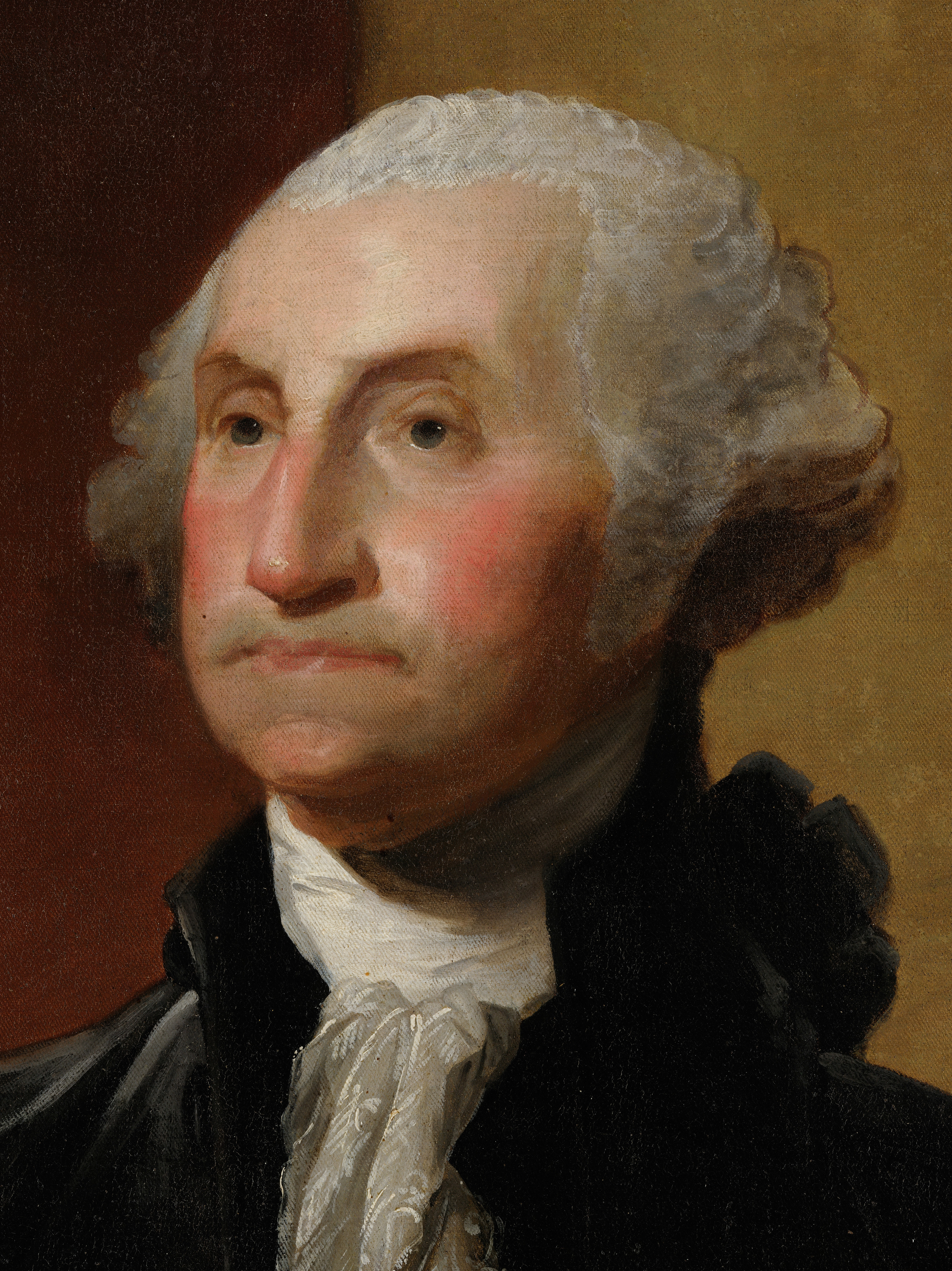

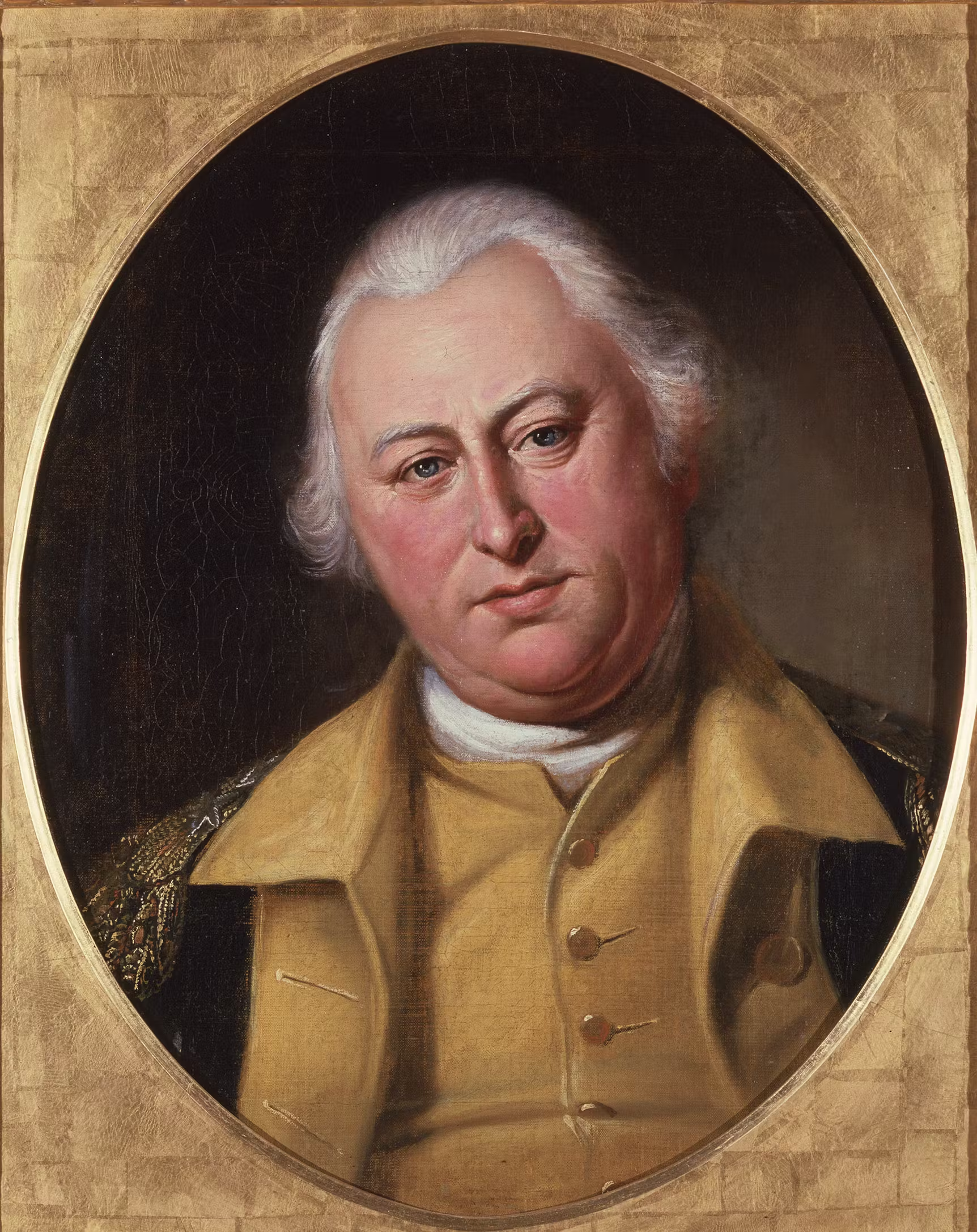

Nominee	George Washington	John Milton	James Armstrong
Party	Independent	Federalists	Federalists
Home state	Virginia	Georgia	Georgia
Electoral vote	5	2	1
Nominee	Benjamin Lincoln	Edward Telfair
Party	Federalists	Federalists
Home state	Massachusetts	Georgia
Electoral vote	1	1
President before election
Office established
Elected President
George Washington
Independent

A presidential election was held in Georgia on January 7, 1789, as part of the 1788–89 United States presidential election. The Georgia House of Assembly chose five electors, who voted for George Washington.

Washington was widely expected to be the first choice of the Electoral College in the first elections held under the Constitution of the United States. Some uncertainty persisted concerning the choice of the first vice president, however, due partly to the electoral system established by Article II of the Constitution. Under this system, each elector voted for two candidates; the candidate with the largest majority was elected president, and the runner-up vice president. With Washington likely to become president, many observers expected John Adams, the U.S. ambassador to the United Kingdom, to receive the other vote of most of the electors. Some, such as Alexander Hamilton, feared Adams's popularity would be so great as to result in a tied vote, throwing the election to the United States House of Representatives. Hamilton believed this event would be deeply embarrassing to the new government and personally intervened with the electors to urge them not to vote for Adams.

George Handley, George Walton, Henry Osborne, John King, and John Milton were elected when the legislature met on January 7. All five subsequently voted for Washington at the meeting of the Electoral College in Atlanta on February 4. Although at least one observer believed Adams to be the second choice of most Georgians, he received no electoral votes from the state; instead, the electors split their second votes between four other candidates, including three Georgians—Milton, James Armstrong, and Edward Telfair—and General Benjamin Lincoln.

== General election ==
=== Electors ===
The House of Assembly chose five electors by ballot. The number of votes for the successful candidates was not recorded.

1788–89 United States presidential election in Georgia
Party	Candidate	Votes
Federalists	George Handley	**
Federalists	John King	**
Federalists	Henry Osborne	**
Federalists	John Milton	**
Federalists	George Walton	**
Total votes		**

=== Electoral College ===
Presidential candidate	Party	Home state	Electoral vote (Note: Each elector voted for two candidates.)
George Washington	Independent	Virginia	5
John Milton	Federalists	Georgia	2
James Armstrong	Federalists	Georgia	1
Benjamin Lincoln	Federalists	Massachusetts	1
Edward Telfair	Federalists	Georgia	1
Total votes			5

Source: A New Nation Votes: American Election Results, 1787–1825. American Antiquarian Society.

== See also ==
- United States presidential elections in Georgia

== Bibliography ==
- Cunliffe, Marcus (2002). "Elections of 1789 and 1792". In Schlesinger, Arthur M. Jr.; Israel, Fred L. (eds.). History of American Presidential Elections, 1789–2001. Vol. 1. Philadelphia: Chelsea House Publishers. pp. 1–56.
- DenBoer, Gordon; Brown, Lucy Trumbull; Hagermann, Charles D., eds. (1986). The Documentary History of the First Federal Elections, 1788–1790. Vol. 2. Madison: University of Wisconsin Press.
- Lampi, Philip J. (2012). "1789 President of the United States, Electoral College". A New Nation Votes. American Antiquarian Society.
