= Governor Handley =

Governor Handley may refer to:

- George Handley (politician) (1752–1793), 18th Governor of Georgia
- Harold W. Handley (1909–1972), 40th Governor of Indiana

== See also ==
- Frank Hanly (1863–1920), 26th Governor of Indiana
