= New Savannah Bluff Lock and Dam =

Dam in Georgia, United States

Coordinates: 33°22′21″N 81°56′27″W

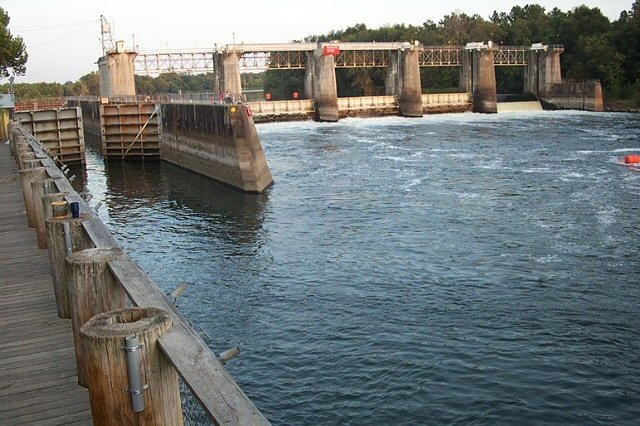
- Location: Richmond County, Georgia / Aiken County, South Carolina, United States
- Opening date: 1937
- Operator(s): Army Corps of Engineers

Dam and spillways
- Impounds: Savannah River
- Height: 15 feet
- Length: 360 ft (379 m)

Reservoir
- Creates: Savannah River

Power Station
- Turbines: 0
- Installed capacity: 0 MW

New Savannah Bluff Lock and Dam is a dam with inactive lock at the site of the town of New Savannah, Georgia on the Savannah River south of Augusta, Georgia.

== Purpose ==
The dam was constructed by the Army Corps of Engineers for commercial navigation purposes to serve the city of Augusta, located approximately 13 miles (21 km) upstream. It does not serve a hydroelectric power generation or flood control function.

== History ==
Located at river mile 187.4, the lock and dam was authorized by the 1930 and 1935 Rivers and Harbors Acts to facilitate commercial navigation on the upper reaches of the Savannah River. The structure was completed in 1937. The last commercial shipping to use the lock ceased in 1979 and the structure and upstream channel fell into disuse. In 1999 the Corps of Engineers proposed demolishing and removing the dam, but local outcry over the resulting impact to users of the impounded pool resulted in the United States Congress declaring in 2000 that the dam would be repaired and then turned over to a local government to be maintained, however the work never received funding.

The Water Infrastructure Improvements for the Nation Act (the WIIN Act), deauthorized the lock and dam and directed the Army Corps to construct fish passage across the existing dam while maintaining the impoundment of water. The deepening of the Savannah River to allow Neopanamax-sized ships reach the Port of Savannah caused saltwater to damage spawning grounds of the endangered shortnose sturgeon near the mouth of the river. Allowing fish passage upriver of the New Savannah Bluff dam to historic spawning grounds was identified as a mitigation to this damage. As of June 2018, the Army Corps presented five alternatives to allow fish passage and expects to select a plan in 2019 and begin construction in 2021.

== Current uses ==
The dam serves water supply users including one municipality, five industries, and one sod farm; water-related recreation opportunities such as general boating and fishing and specialized rowing and powerboat race events; and regional economic development and tourism. It is also operated to pass some migratory anadromous fish species. The upstream pool extends through downtown Augusta to near the I-20 bridges.

== Structure ==
This project consists of a lock chamber, dam, operation building, and a 50-acre (200,000 m^{2}) park and recreation area. The dam is 360 feet (110 m) long with five vertical lift gates. Each gate is 60 feet (18 m) long and located between concrete piers. The two gates on each end of the dam are 12 feet (3.7 m) high, overflow type. The three middle gates are 15 feet (4.6 m) high, non-overflow type. All are remotely controlled from the J. Strom Thurmond project. The lock is on the Georgia side of the river adjacent to the dam. The lock’s usable chamber is 56 feet (17 m) wide and 360 feet (110 m) long and the lift height is approximately 15 feet (4.6 m). Construction of this concrete gravity structure supported by timber piles was completed in 1937.

== Gallery ==
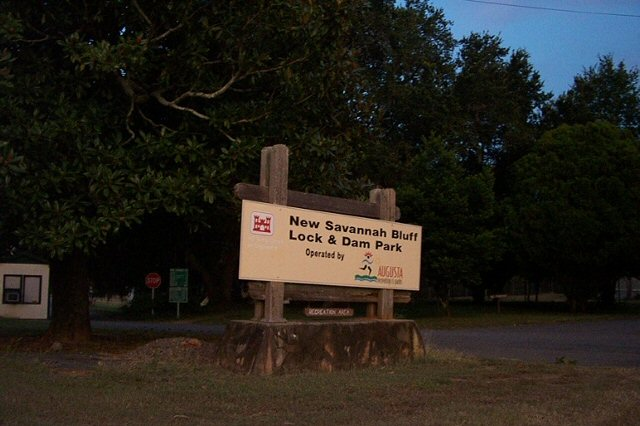
Savannah Bluff Lock and Dam; Park sign.

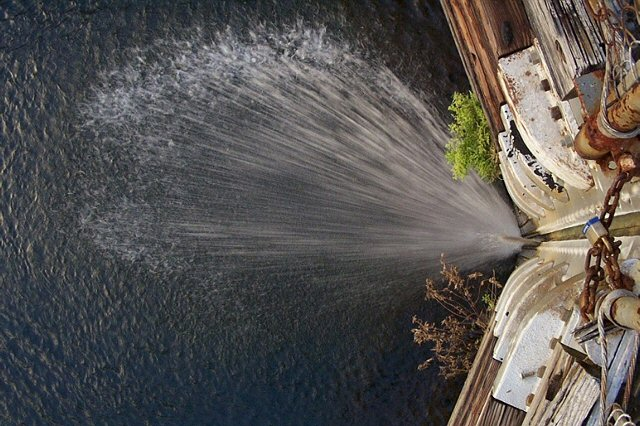
Savannah Bluff Lock and Dam; Water spraying from upstream pool into lock chamber through upper gate as viewed from walkway.

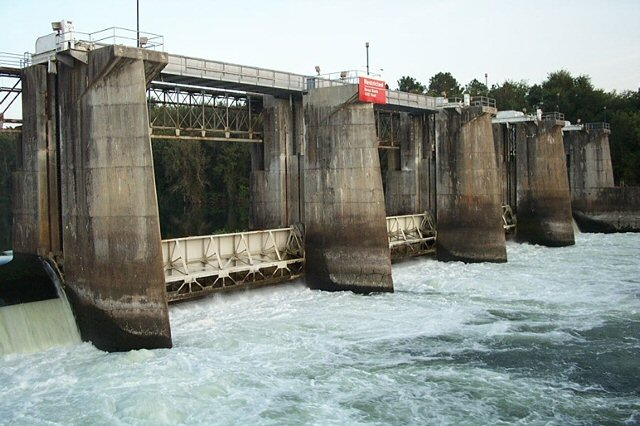
Savannah Bluff Lock and Dam; Dam structure, Gates 1 and 5 open.

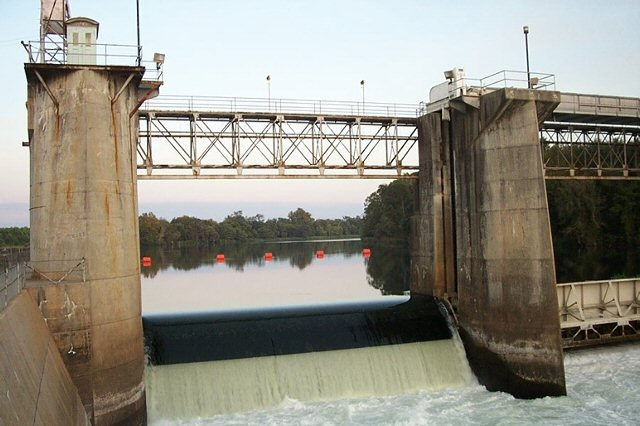
Savannah Bluff Lock and Dam; Open gate for upstream pool elevation control.

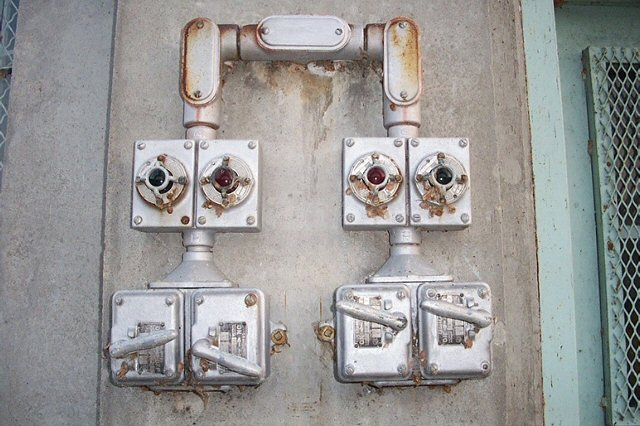
Savannah Bluff Lock and Dam; Lock control hand switches.

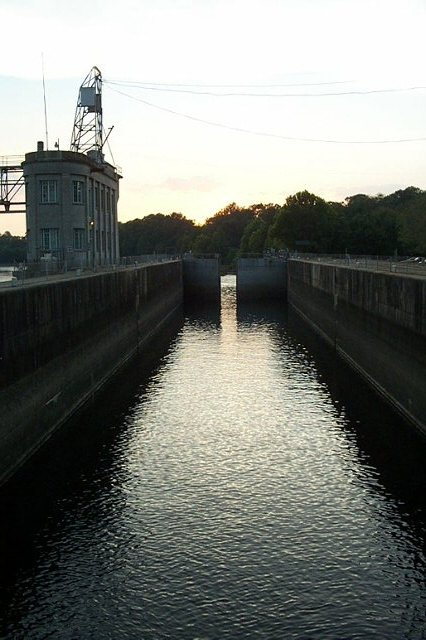
Savannah Bluff Lock and Dam; Empty lock chamber, 1937 control structure to left.

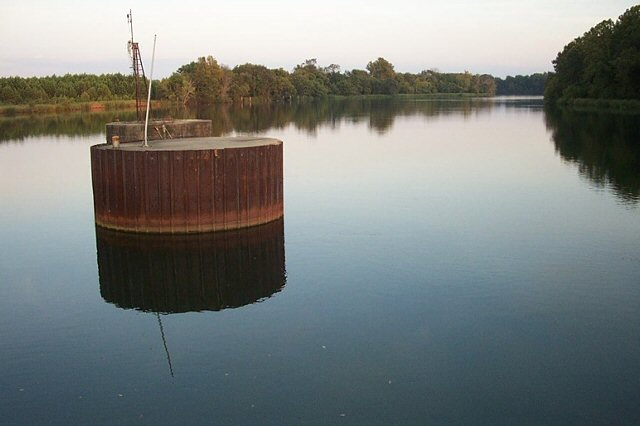
Savannah Bluff Lock and Dam; View of upstream pool north of dam. Inactive dolphins for use in barge navigation in foreground.

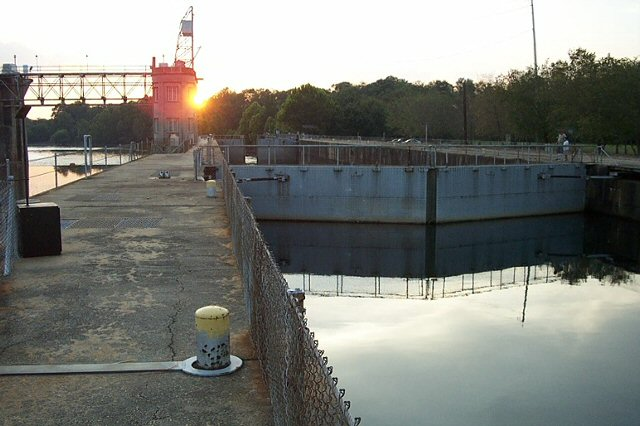
Savannah Bluff Lock and Dam; Lock structure on west bank of river looking downstream.

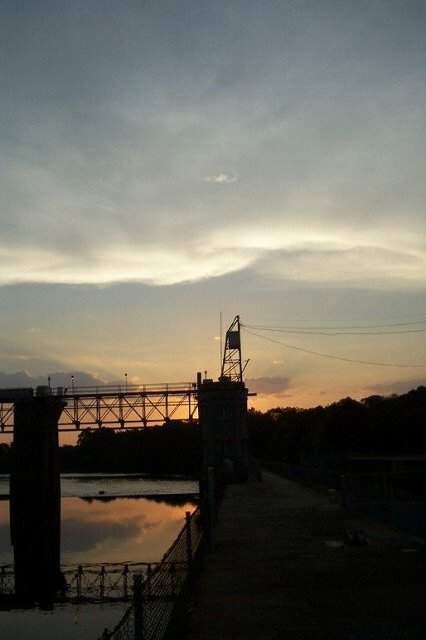
Savannah Bluff Lock and Dam; Lock and Dam at sunset.

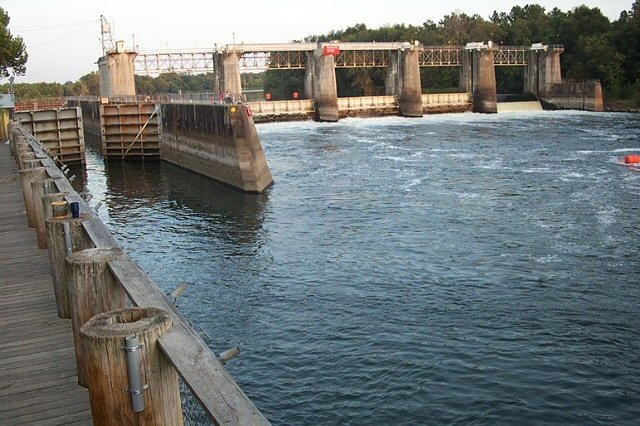
Savannah Bluff Lock and Dam; View of Lock and Dam from adjacent park looking upstream.

== Notes ==
This article contains public domain text from the Corps of Engineers.
