= John Walton (Continental Congress) =

American Founding Father and politician

John Walton (1738–1783), a Founding Father of the United States, was a Georgia delegate to the Continental Congress. Though born in Virginia, Walton later became a planter near Augusta, Georgia. He was elected as a delegate from St. Paul Parish to the Provincial Congress at Savannah in 1775, and then elected to the Continental Congress in 1778. He signed the Articles of Confederation on behalf of Georgia on July 24, 1778. He held the office of surveyor of Richmond County for several years before his death in New Savannah, Georgia in 1783.

Walton's brother was George Walton, a signer of the Declaration of Independence for Georgia and one of the first governors of Georgia.
