= Creekside (Morganton, North Carolina) =

Historic house in North Carolina, United States

- U.S. National Register of Historic Places
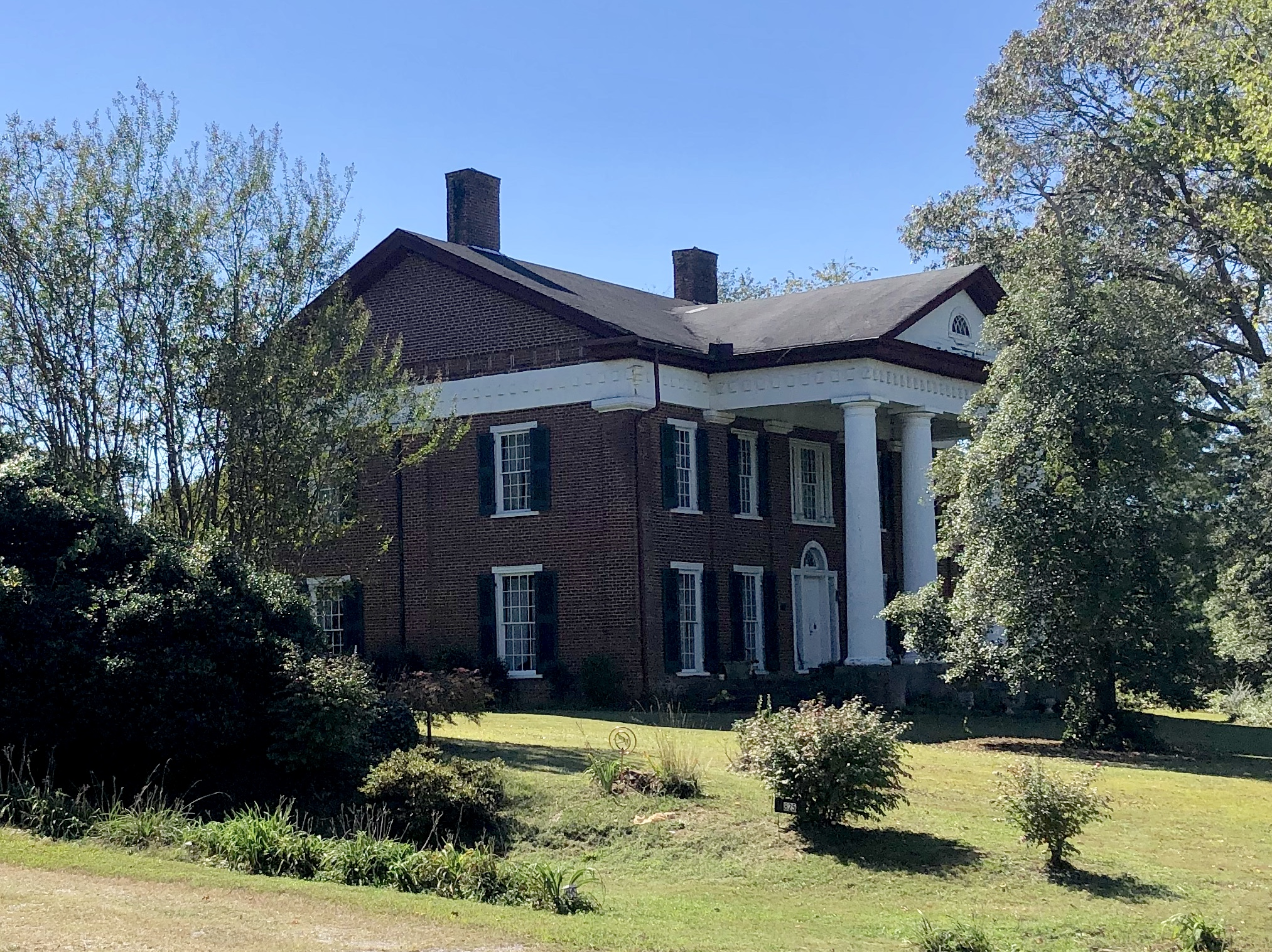
- Side and front

- Location within North Carolina Location within the United States
- Location: W of Morganton at jct. of U.S. 70 and 70A, near Morganton, North Carolina
- Coordinates: 35°44′7″N 81°42′31″W
- Area: 2 acres (0.81 ha)
- Built: 1836
- Architectural style: Greek Revival, Federal
- NRHP reference No.: 72000926
- Added to NRHP: February 1, 1972

Creekside is a historic home located near Morganton, Burke County, North Carolina. It was built in 1836, and is a two-story, five-bay, brick mansion with a gable roof in the Greek Revival style. It features a tetrastyle pedimented portico covers with heavy stuccoed brick Doric order columns. The interior features Federal style decorative elements. It was built by Colonel Thomas George Walton, great nephew of George Walton, a signer of the Declaration of Independence.

It was listed on the National Register of Historic Places in 1972.
