= John Milton (Georgia politician) =

Secretary of State of Georgia, USA (c.1740/57-1817)

1st Secretary of State of Georgia
- In office 1777–1799
- Governor: Button Gwinnett to James Jackson; 23 total governors
- Succeeded by: Horatio Marbury

Personal details
- Born: c. 1740 Halifax County, Province of North Carolina
- Died: 1817 (aged 59–77) Burke County, Georgia
- Party: Federalist
- Occupation: Politician

Military service
- Allegiance: United States of America
- Branch/service: Continental Army
- Years of service: 1776-1782
- Rank: Lieutenant Colonel
- Unit: 1st Georgia Regiment
- Battles/wars: American Revolution

John Milton (c. 1740/1757–1817) was a Revolutionary War officer from a family of settlers in North Carolina who became a Colonial-era political figure that played a prominent role in the establishment and growth of the state of Georgia.

== Early years and military career ==
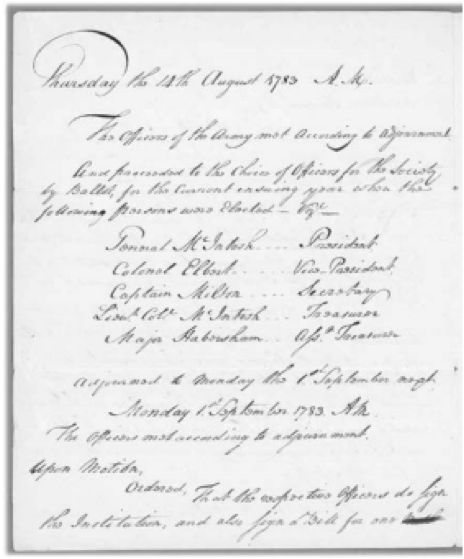
John Milton, the first Secretary of State of Georgia, elected three times; major of Augusta; Revolutionary War hero; was, also, the First Secretary of the Georgia Society of the Cincinnati

Milton was born in Halifax County, North Carolina. John Milton's family in North Carolina was constituted by migration of English families, including the Milton family, from Virginia from the early to mid 1700s. English laws passed that "touched off a boom in North Carolina that lasted from 1730 to the American Revolution." The most recent research demonstrates with a preponderance of evidence that Milton's father, also John, migrated to the North Carolina Coastal Plain with cousins, e.g., Robert Milton (1696-1759; died in Orange County, NC). Thus, John Milton of Halifax, North Carolina is likely a descendant of the scrivener Richard Milton, who immigrated on the ship "Supply," 1621/22, to Barclay/Jamestown. The Carolinian John Milton joined the Continental Army as an ensign in the 1st Georgia Regiment, Jan. 7, 1776; was promoted 1st lieutenant, and was taken prisoner at Fort Howe, Georgia, in February 1777, with Lieut. William Caldwell, on the surrender of that place, held as a hostage and imprisoned in the castle at St. Augustine, Florida, until November 1777. He was promoted captain, Sept. 15, 1777, and on his release returned to the army and served until the end of the war, retiring Sept. 15, 1782. Milton was admitted as an original member of The Society of the Cincinnati in the state of Georgia, serving as the Georgia constituent society's first secretary from 1783 to 1786. He engaged in planting after the war.

== Political service ==
Milton was the first Georgia Secretary of State, elected in 1777. On Dec. 6, 1778, at the approach of the British, he removed the public records to Perrysburg by order of the governor. He served in that position again in 1781–83 and 1789. His adopted home state showed its gratitude to Milton's service with two electoral votes in the historic first presidential election. He was also one of the first mayors of Augusta, Georgia. John Milton was a signer to Georgia's ratification of the U.S. Constitution.

== Legacy ==
John married Hannah E. Spencer, and of their children, Gen. Homer Virgil Milton (q.v.), was an officer in the War of 1812. His grandson, also named John Milton, served as the governor of Florida during the Civil War. The governor's son, Jefferson Davis Milton, AKA "Jeff Milton", great-grandson of the subject of this article, became a Western lawman, Texas Ranger, Arizona lawman, and father of the U. S. Border Patrol. Another of John Milton's great-great-grandson was William Hall Milton, United States Senator from Florida.

John Milton's legacy as a Georgia founding father led to the naming of a county after him. Milton County, Georgia was formed in 1857, with a population of 6,730 in 1930, merged with Fulton County on January 1, 1932, through an act of the state legislature. In 2010 there was an effort to revive Milton County by separating portions of Fulton County.

John Milton has recently been honored again by the formation of a new municipality in Georgia. The City of Milton, Georgia was formed in 2006 by an act of the Georgia Legislature, signed by Governor Sonny Purdue. The City of Milton mentions its namesake on its website: "Named after Revolutionary War Hero John Milton, the City of Milton is a part of Fulton County with County Commission representation."
