= New Savannah, Georgia =

Extinct town in Georgia, USA

Coordinates: 33°22′21″N 81°56′45″W

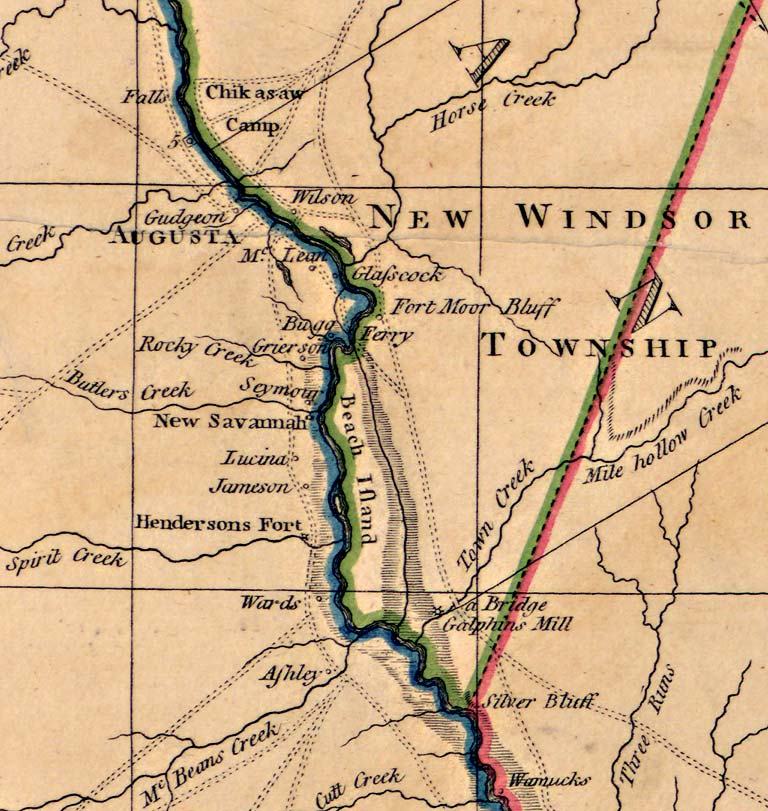
Central Savannah River in 1780 showing Augusta, Ft Moore, and New Savannah

The dead town of New Savannah began circa 1740 as a Chickasaw village on the Savannah River, at the mouth of Butler Creek below Augusta. Stories as to the circumstances vary, but in any case some portion of the Horse Creek Chickasaws under Squirrel King moved across the river and founded the town from which they farmed, hunted and scouted until the Revolutionary War. In 1757, CPT Daniel Pepper estimated the population there as "seventy Gun Men" (Milling 1940:196).

After the Revolution, New Savannah became a tobacco inspection. Tobacco leaf grown at local farms was packed into large hogshead barrels, and rolled to the town to obtain the official quality inspection necessary for its marketing. Sealed and quality-branded hogsheads were then loaded onto pole boats for transport to the seaport and market at Savannah, Georgia 215 river miles downstream. Augusta's Tobacco Road still exists by that name and, according to Georgia Place-Names, was laid out in 1789. The tobacco market waned in the very early 19th century and, with that, the commercial existence of New Savannah.

(Note that the similarly named and somewhat contemporaneous Savannah Town, South Carolina was located by Fort Moore several miles upstream.)

== Geography ==
New Savannah was located at 33°22'21"N, 81°56'45"W (NAD83/WGS84), at the mouth of Butler Creek about 14 river miles downstream of Augusta, Georgia. Aside from a nearby cemetery, nothing remains of the original site, which is located within New Savannah Bluff Lock and Dam Park.
