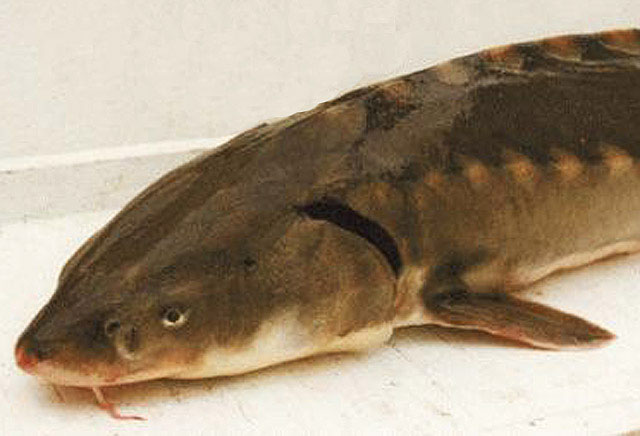

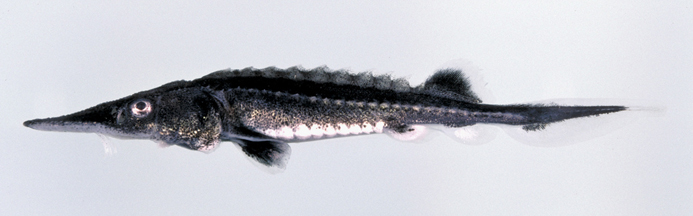
- Adult above, juvenile below

Conservation status
- Vulnerable (IUCN 3.1)
- CITES Appendix I

Scientific classification
- Kingdom: Animalia
- Phylum: Chordata
- Class: Actinopterygii
- Order: Acipenseriformes
- Family: Acipenseridae
- Genus: Acipenser
- Species: A. brevirostrum

Binomial name
- Acipenser brevirostrum (Lesueur, 1818)

Synonyms
- Ichthyocolla Geoffroy 1767 non Agassiz 1846; Dinoctus truncatus Rafinesque 1818; Acipenser (Huso) dekayi Duméril 1870; Acipenser (Huso) lesueurii Valenciennes ex Duméril 1870; Acipenser measius Lesueur 1896; Acipenser (Huso) microrhynchus Duméril 1870; Acipenser obtusirostris Lovetsky 1834 non Brusina 1902; Acipenser (Huso) rostellum Duméril 1870; Acipenser (Huso) simus Valenciennes ex Duméril 1870

= Shortnose sturgeon =

Species of fish

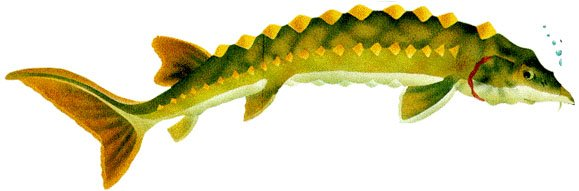
Huso brevirostrum

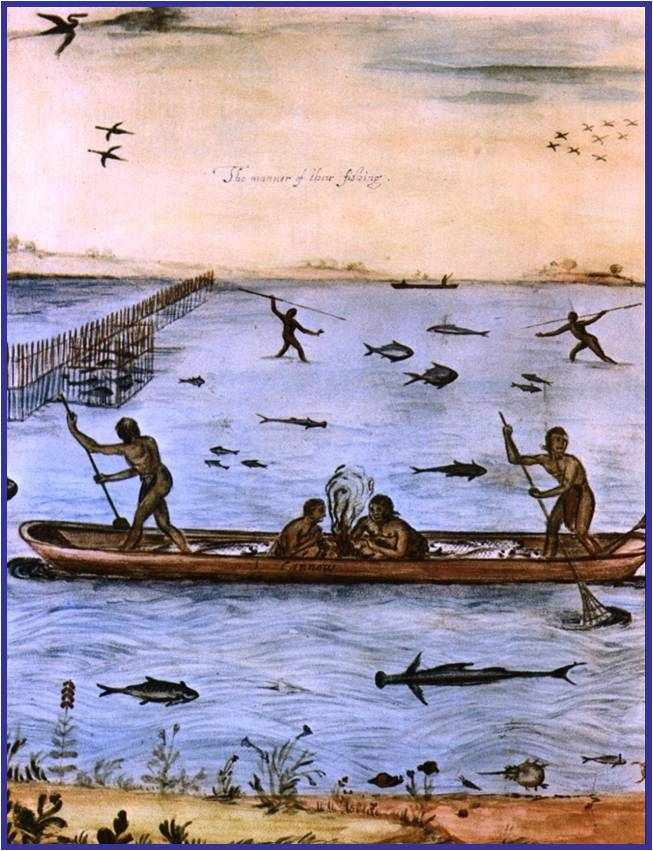
Fishing for sturgeon was a common practice among Native Americans and settlers who arrived along the East Coast of North America.

The shortnose sturgeon (Acipenser brevirostrum) is a small and endangered species of North American sturgeon. As with most sturgeons, it is an anadromous bottom-feeder, which migrates upstream to spawn but spends most of its life feeding in rivers, deltas and estuaries.

Shortnose sturgeons are long-lived and slow to sexually mature. The shortnose sturgeon is often mistaken as a juvenile Atlantic sturgeon (A. oxyrinchus) because of its small size. Prior to 1973, U.S. commercial fishing records did not differentiate between the two species: both were reported as "common sturgeon", although it is believed based on sizes that the bulk of the catch was Atlantic sturgeon. The shortnose is distinguishable from the Atlantic sturgeon due to its shorter and rounder head.

== Taxonomy ==
The species is currently placed in the genus Acipenser. However, some have suggested that the genus Acipenser is paraphyletic, and it is more accurately placed in the genus Huso. If followed, shortnose sturgeon would be one of two species of Huso found in North America alongside the lake sturgeon (H. fulvescens). However, later studies found that Huso is a junior synonym of the genus name Sterletus, coined for the sterlet. After previously placing the species in Huso in 2025, Eschmeyer's Catalog of Fishes returned all the reclassified species to Acipenser later that same year, until the nomenclature could be clarified.

== Distribution ==
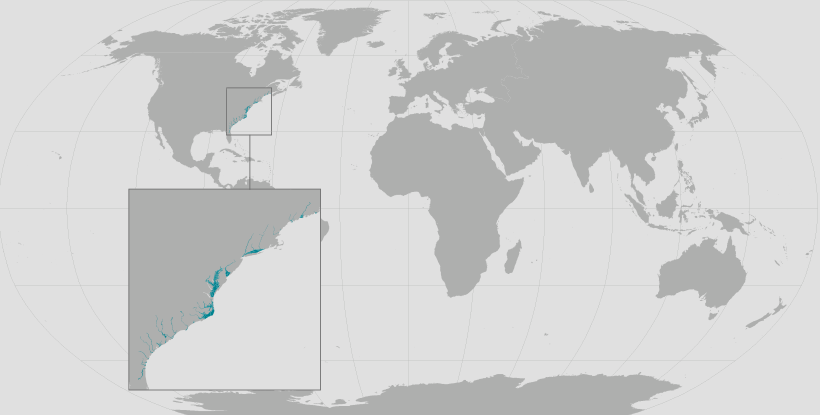
Shortnose sturgeon range map along the East Coast of the United States

Historically, shortnose sturgeon were found in the coastal rivers along the East Coast of North America. Living from the Saint John River in New Brunswick all the way to the Indian River in Florida. Currently, shortnose sturgeon can be found in 41 bays and rivers along the East Coast. Their distribution across this range is broken up, with a large gap of about 250 miles separating the northern and mid-Atlantic metapopulations from the southern metapopulation. There has been a shift slightly with lower sturgeon levels in river systems particularly further south. Modern spawning locations for the sturgeon include areas such as the Saint John River, Bay of Fundy, and the Altamaha River with noticeable absences in North Carolina rivers. It is considered extirpated from Washington, D.C., and may be extirpated in Rhode Island and Virginia.

The southern metapopulations of shortnose sturgeon are currently found in the Great Pee Dee, Waccamaw, Edisto, Cooper, Santee, Altamaha, Ogeechee, and Savannah rivers. They may also be found in the Black, Sampit, Ashley, Roanoke, and Cape Fear rivers. Shortnose sturgeon were considered extinct in the Satilla, St. Marys, and the St. Johns rivers, but were recently found again in both the Satilla and St. Marys rivers.

In the northern and mid-Atlantic metapopulations, shortnose sturgeon are currently found in Saint John (Canada), Penobscot, Kennebec, Androscoggin, Piscataqua, Merrimack, Connecticut, Hudson, Delaware, and Potomac rivers. They have also been spotted foraging and transiting in the St. George, Medomak, Damariscotta, Sheepscot, Saco, Deerfield, East, and Susquehanna rivers. On rare occasions, they have been seen in the Narraguagus, Presumpscot, Westfield, Housatonic, Schuylkill, Rappahannock, and James rivers.

A healthy, recovering population has been recorded in New York Harbor, representing a rare example of an endangered fish thriving in an urbanized landscape. This population is the largest known individual population of any sturgeon species worldwide.

== Habitat ==
Shortnose sturgeon live in rivers and coastal waters and streams that run from Canada to Florida. Because shortnose sturgeon are amphidromous fish, after spawning most of their time is spent in estuaries and rivers. Shortnose sturgeon rarely spend time in the Atlantic Ocean. However, if the sturgeon do enter marine waters to feed or migrate they stay close to the shore. Shortnose sturgeon are more likely to move through all areas of a river system. Times they remain at sites for an extended period of time include resting and feeding periods.

Critical habitat has not been designated for the shortnose sturgeon. This is an area of the conservation plan that is essential to the conservation of the species. Research needs to be done to identify what habitats are critical to ensure the protection of each life stage.

One area of research for discovering and designating critical habitat of shortnose sturgeon will be the study of foraging ecology and growth of the various life stages, as well as defining the benthic habitats that support preferred prey. To enhance this understanding, results on the mapping of the benthic organisms will be needed to better define both the available and preferred diets of sturgeon. Probabilistic or generalized linear models or similar approaches used to map benthic habitat should be constructed to help identify the distribution of shortnose sturgeon density. Additionally, obtaining information on nursery areas and characterization of nursery habitat is a major priority.

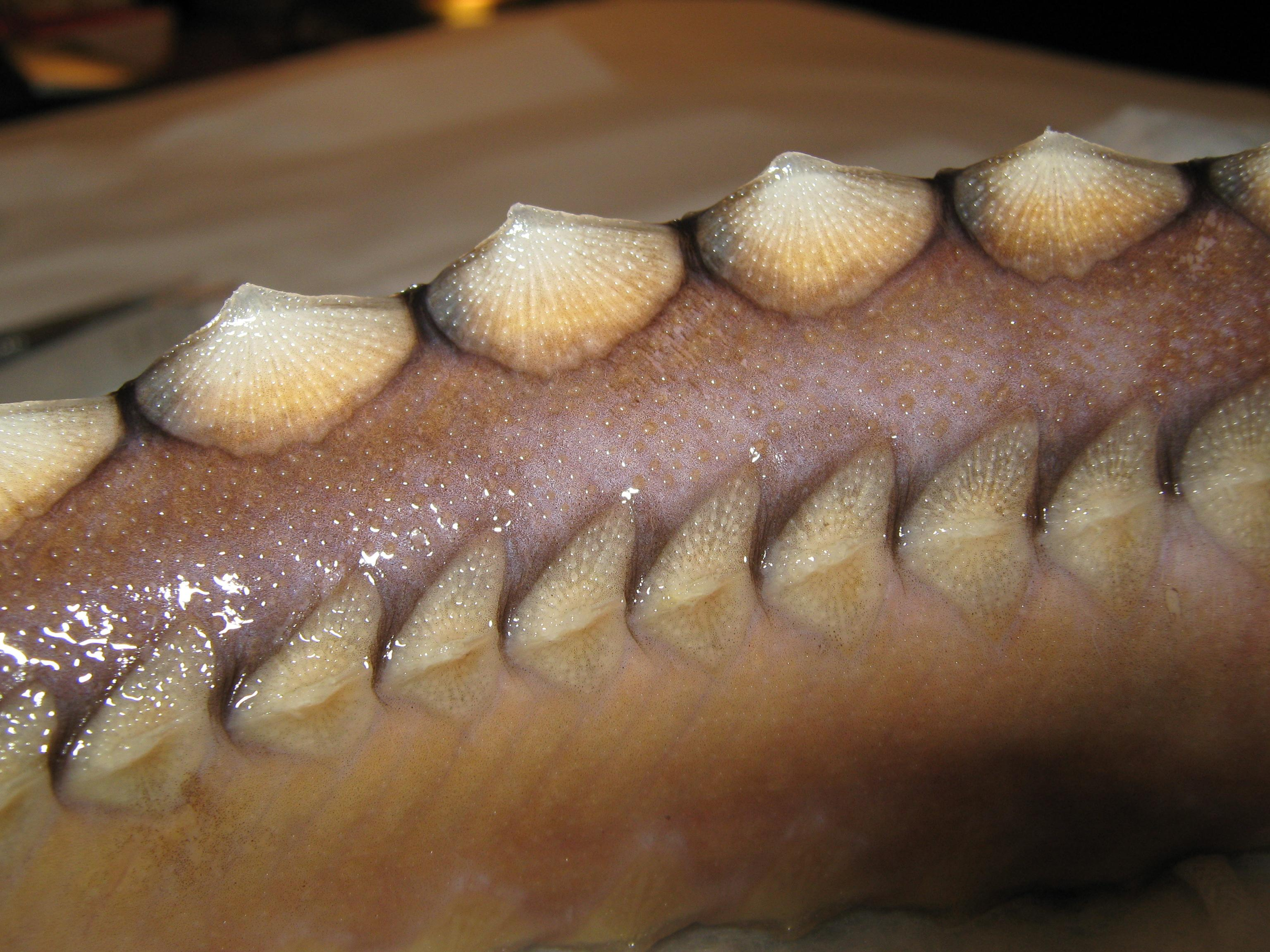
Scutes along the back of a sturgeon.

== Description ==
The shortnose sturgeon is the smallest of three sturgeon species that are present in the eastern seaboard of North America. It has a cylindrical body and compared to the Atlantic sturgeon, its head and snout are relatively small. Younger shortnose sturgeons tend to have longer snouts compared to their older counterparts. Adult sturgeons have bony plates along their esophagus that help them crush hard items instead of having teeth.

Shortnose sturgeon are cartilaginous with bones only in the skull, jaw and pectoral girdle. It is a physostome fish, so its swim bladder is connected to the intestinal tract by a special duct. This duct allows for gas pressure regulation through swallowing air or releasing air through the gut. The intestines for shortnose sturgeon are dark and have a spiral valve (important for nutrient absorption), similar to that of sharks and rays. These sturgeons tend to be generally dark brown to olive/black on the dorsal surface.

Shortnose sturgeon tend to consume small bivalves, gastropods, polychaetes, and small benthic fishes based on studies of their gut contents. The most common prey are amphipods, while Atlantic sturgeon primarily consume polychaetes. Some reports have found that female adult shortnose sturgeon feed throughout the year, but a study from the Saint John River found that pre-spawning females rarely had food in their stomachs and likely stopped feeding about eight months prior to spawning while ripening males generally had full stomachs.

Sturgeon are often called "living fossils", due to their ancient lineage and a fossil record that points to a holarctic distribution. With the earliest reported remains of North American sturgeon dating to the late Cretaceous period. Sturgeons have bony plates called scutes that extend from the skull to the caudal peduncle and are divided into five rows on the body: one dorsal row, then two lateral and ventral rows respectively. The fins on the shortnose sturgeon are located far back on the body. The pectoral fins are positioned low, while the pelvic fins are along with the abdominal position. Prominent features of the shortnose sturgeon are the scutes, protractile tube-like mouth, and chemosensory barbels. Sturgeon tend to be long-lived, slow-maturing, and spawn infrequently, which have served the species well through evolutionary time but poorly to anthropogenic impacts like overharvesting, habitat loss, and degradation.

There is little data around predation on shortnose sturgeon. Known predators include yellow perch for fry, and grey seals for adults. Potential predators include alligators, sharks, eagles, and large fish such as gar or catfish. Known predators of other sturgeon species include sea lampreys, gar, striped bass, common carp, northern pikeminnow, channel catfish, smallmouth bass, walleye, fallfish, and sea lions.

== Behavior ==
The life history of shortnose sturgeon begins with adults that lay their eggs in freshwater and then return to saltwater. The eggs are left to fend for themselves after spawning. As they age, the young fish slowly move to more saline water. Living in fresh or brackish water until they are at least a year old. Males can live up to around 30 years old while females can live to be close to 70 years old.

Shortnose sturgeon spawn in moving freshwater water, over rubble or gravel bottoms. Time of spawning varies by latitude and is likely based on water temperatures in the range from 6.5–15 °C (43.7–59.0 °F); this may be as early as January in South Carolina or as late as May in Canada. The eggs hatch after 13 days when incubated at water temperatures of 8 to 12 °C (46 to 54 °F), into 7- to 11-mm-long hatchlings with a large yolk sac, minimal swimming ability that is used for negative phototaxis, and a strong tendency to seek cover. After another 8–12 days, at about 15 mm in length, they will have resorbed their yolk sacs and matured to a swimming larval stage. They resemble a miniature adult by the time they have reached 20 mm in length and begun feeding. They then drift downstream in the deep channels of the river, remaining in freshwater for the first year of their lives. Juveniles, up to 18 in long, generally move to brackish water, and move with it through the tidal cycle.

Adults mature sexually around 18 to 22 inches in length. Males mature after 2–3 years in their warmest habitats or 10–14 years in colder climates, and females mature between 6 and 17 years of age (again, earlier in southern rivers). Adults continue to grow to between 3 and 4 ft in length. A male may breed every year or every other year and seldom lives beyond age 30. Females usually breed every third to the fifth year, lying between 40,000 and 200,000 eggs when they breed and can live to age 67. Females spend multiple years with reduced feeding and growth while they are producing the gonadal material needed for spawning.

Behavioral information has been collected and demonstrated differences in the innate dispersal patterns in early life stages of shortnose sturgeon from the Connecticut River versus those of Savannah River origin. This research suggested that shortnose sturgeon are likely behaviorally adapted to unique features of their watershed.

== Major conservation threats and human impact ==
The history of the shortnose sturgeon exploitation goes back 4,000 years. Native American fishermen harvested shortnose and Atlantic sturgeon for their meat and eggs. This continued with the Jamestown settlers in 1607 who utilized sturgeon as the primary food source for survival. Profitable fishery business using shortnose sturgeon began to grow in the 1800s leading to a rapid decline of the species population and distribution. By the late-1800s, sturgeon were being over-exploited. In 1890, over 7 million pounds of sturgeon were harvested in 1 year and as a result, in 1920, only 23,000 pounds of sturgeon were caught. Today, the shortnose sturgeon is in danger of extinction throughout its range and was listed as endangered under the Endangered Species Act on March 11, 1967. Shortnose sturgeon are protected in accordance with Section 1(c) of the Endangered Species Preservation Act of October 15, 1966 (80 Stat. 926: 16 U.S.C. 668aa(c)) after consulting the States, interested organizations and individual scientists, and finding that it was threatened with extinction. The IUCN has listed the shortnose sturgeon as a vulnerable species in 2004 with increasing action plans needed. NatureServe similarly lists the species as globally vulnerable to extinction.

Although there are now about 12,000 adult shortnose sturgeon living within the Delaware River estuary, the population faces serious human-induced threats. Water quality contaminants such as endocrine distributing chemicals (EDCs) have been linked to reproductive and developmental disorders in many fish species. These contaminants were found in shortnose sturgeon tissue collected in 2001 and include PCDDs/TCDFs, DDE, PCBs, and cadmium. Other threats to Delaware River shortnose sturgeon include heavy industrialization and waterfront development. This destruction of habitat can affect the sturgeon's ability to travel to freshwater and spawn or can degrade the quality of the habitat. For example, some dams impede sturgeon travel back and forth between salt and fresh water, resulting in the disruption of natural spawning cycles and preventing the reproduction of the already struggling species.

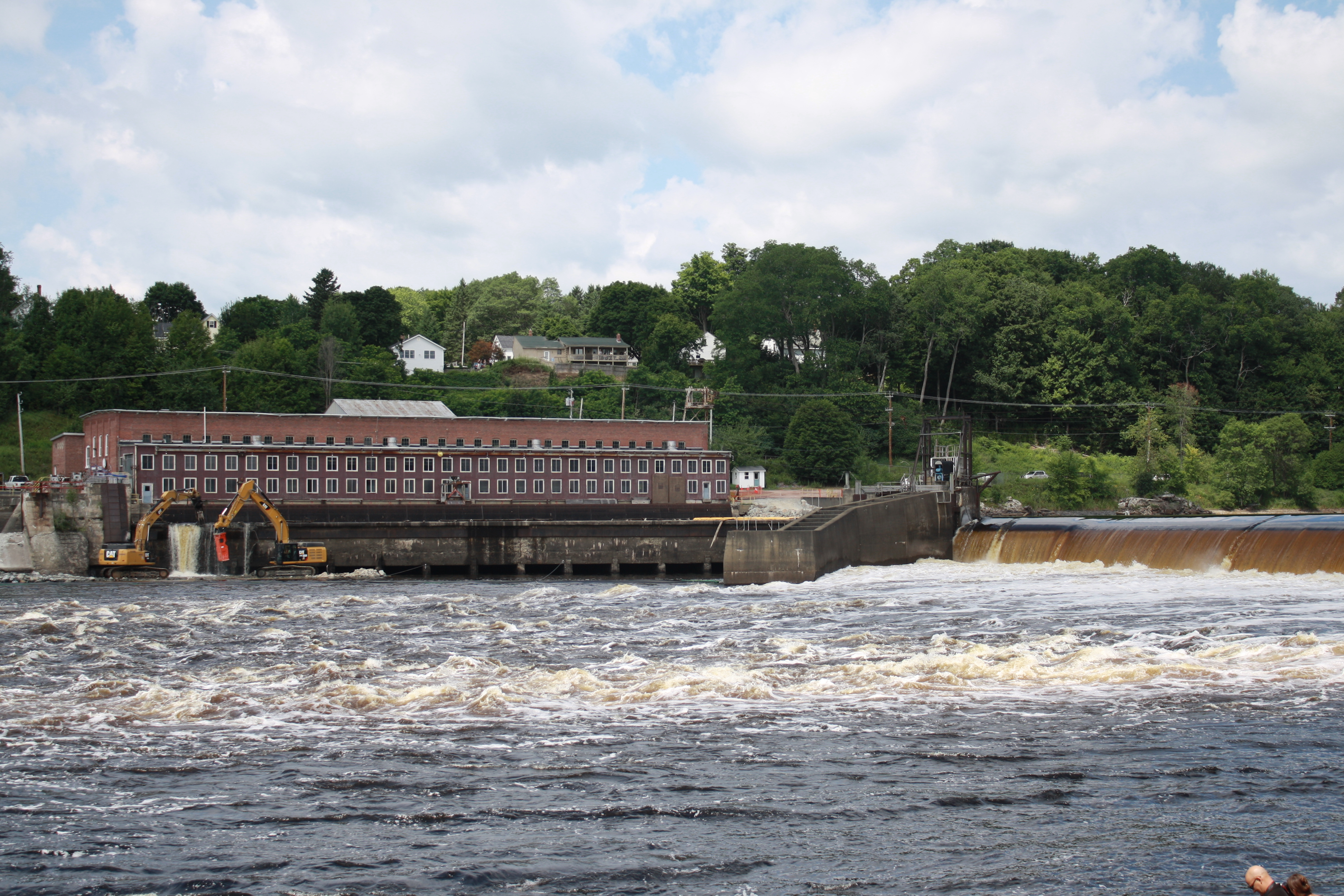
The Veazie Dam, the lowermost dam on the Penobscot River, had blocked Atlantic salmon, American shad, shortnose sturgeon, and eight other sea-run fish from reaching their spawning and juvenile growing habitat for nearly two centuries. It was removed in 2013.

More human-induced threats include ship/boat strikes, poaching, bycatch in commercial and recreational fisheries, injury to early life stages from water intake systems, instream construction projects within the spawning area, and dredging, including the ongoing Delaware River deepening project. Additional research has been done to prove that algal blooms, which can be caused by increased nitrogen levels in runoff or other anthropogenic factors, sometimes result in Shortnose Sturgeon die-offs. Overall, the combination of human-induced destruction of habitat and overconsumption have devastated many species along the Atlantic Coast. The future effects of climate change are not fully understood, however, these could potentially exacerbate many of these struggling populations even further.

== Conservation efforts ==
Conservation efforts for the shortnose sturgeon include removing outdated dams from their habitats. The most recent recovery plan was enacted in December 1998, for the National Marine Fisheries Service National Oceanic and Atmospheric Administration. The stated goal of this plan is to recover populations to levels of abundance at which they no longer require protection under the ESA. For each population segment, the minimum population size will be large enough to maintain genetic diversity and avoid extinction. NOAA Fisheries work with conservation organizations, energy companies, states, tribes, and citizens to evaluate barriers—big and small—to improve upon fish passage.

Breeding programs are currently being used to help the dwindling sturgeon populations. The fish are captured and bred to help provide important insight into the physical, chemical, and biological parameters necessary for the optimal growth, survival, and reproduction of shortnose sturgeon in the wild. Juvenile fish may die if the salinity of the water is not optimal. Captive-bred animals are also used in permanent educational displays that promote public awareness of the plight of the species.

Efforts are also being made to educate the public on the shortnose sturgeon. Scientists are working with students and teachers to learn more about the movements, behavior, and threats to sturgeons. An example of this initiative is the SCUTES program—Students Collaborating to Undertake Tracking Efforts for Sturgeon. It provides lesson plans, educational kits, and an opportunity for classrooms to adopt a tagged sturgeon.

== Original recovery plan ==
After listing the shortnose sturgeon as an endangered species in 1967, the 1998 Recovery Plan was enacted. The goal was to delist shortnose sturgeon populations throughout their range. The plan listed actions that if followed could restore the populations by the year 2024. Each of the population segments could become a candidate for downlisting when it reached a minimum population size that: 1) is large enough to prevent extinction, and 2) will make the loss of genetic diversity unlikely. This minimum population size for each population segment had not yet been determined. To achieve and preserve minimum population sizes for each population segment, essential habitats were identified and maintained, and mortality, monitored and minimized. This plan has since been outdated and replaced.

== Five-year reviews ==
A Shortnose Sturgeon Status Review Team collected data and presented a "A Biological Assessment of Shortnose Sturgeon" to the National Marine Fisheries Service in 2010. In their assessment, the team identified aspects of shortnose sturgeon ecology which requires continued research. Continuing research is needed in areas such as determining population size and structure, modelling larval distribution to identify effects of river manipulation by humans, and enhancing the effectiveness of mass rearing.

The team suggested the following research projects to be conducted in order to improve understanding of the shortnose sturgeons' status. Firstly, continue the survey and tracking of adults to gather additional tissue samples and detect changes in population status (abundance, residency ranges, winter ecology, and spawning success). Secondly, determine status of juveniles (an indication of recruitment) and characterize ecology and habitat use.

This review concluded that the shortnose sturgeon still requires conservation efforts to support populations. The species is still at high risk under the IUCN and ESA listings.
