= George Walton =

American Founding Father and politician

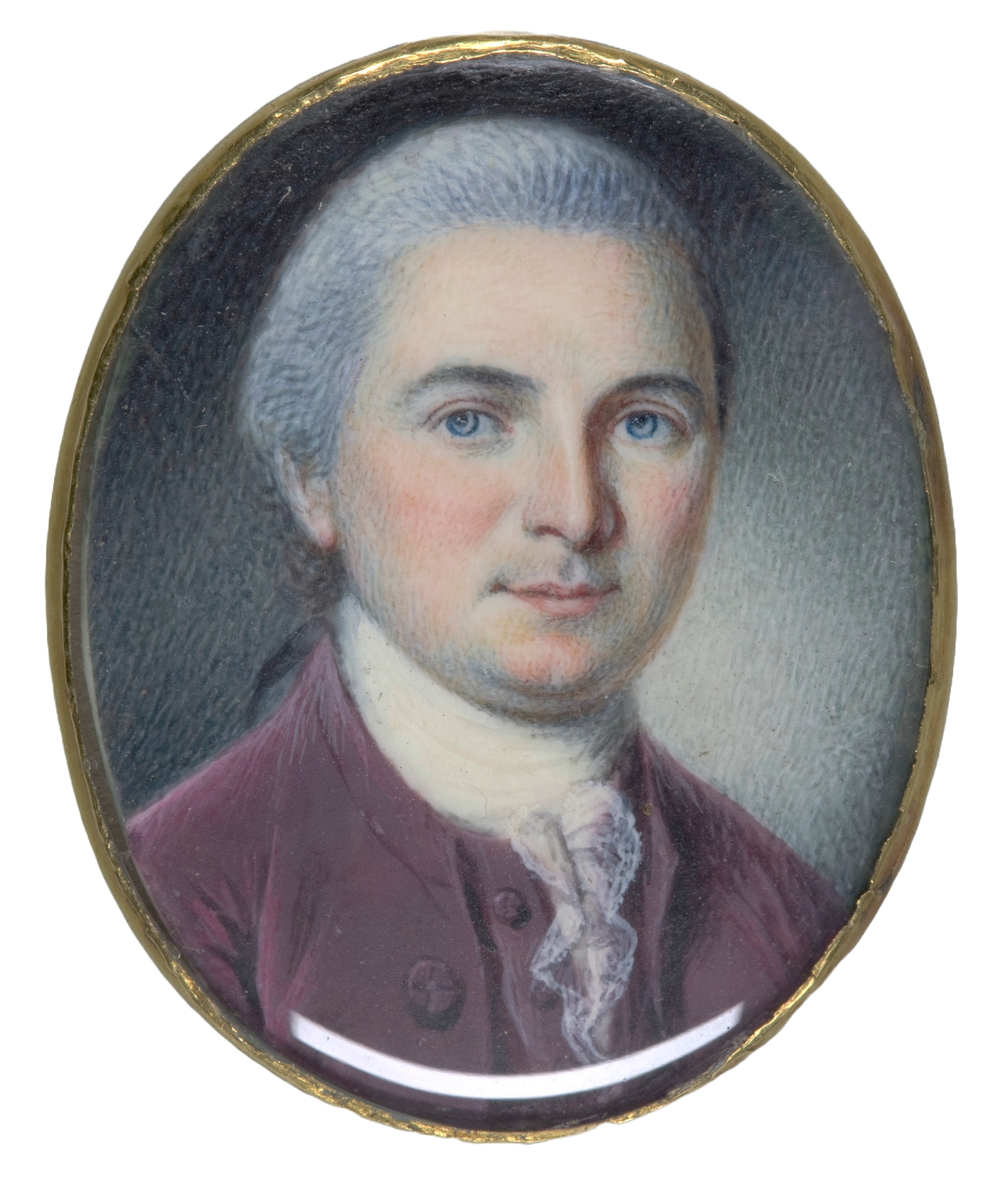
- Portrait by Charles Willson Peale, c. 1781

United States Senator from Georgia
- In office November 16, 1795 – February 20, 1796
- Appointed by: George Mathews
- Preceded by: James Jackson
- Succeeded by: Josiah Tattnall

Acting Governor of Georgia
- In office January 7, 1789 – November 9, 1790
- Preceded by: George Handley
- Succeeded by: Edward Telfair

Delegate from Georgia to the Continental Congress
- In office 1776 – 1777, 1780–1781

Personal details
- Born: c. 1749 Cumberland County, Virginia, British America
- Died: February 2, 1804 (aged 54–55) Augusta, Georgia, U.S.
- Party: Federalist Party
- Relations: The Walton family of Atlanta, Georgia; North Carolina.

Military service
- Allegiance: United States
- Branch/service: Georgia Militia
- Rank: Colonel
- Battles/wars: American Revolutionary War: Capture of Savannah

George Walton (c. 1749 – February 2, 1804) was a Founding Father of the United States who signed the United States Declaration of Independence while representing Georgia in the Continental Congress. Walton also served briefly as the second chief executive of Georgia in 1779 and was again named governor in 1789–1790. In 1795, he was appointed to the U.S. Senate, to complete the unexpired term of a senator who had resigned.

== Early life ==
Walton was born in Cumberland County, Virginia. The exact year of Walton's birth is unknown; it is believed that he was born in 1749. Research has placed it as early as 1740, but others as late as 1749 and 1750. The biographer of the signers of the Declaration of Independence, Della Gray Bartholomew, uses 1741. His parents died when he was an infant, which resulted in his adoption by an uncle with whom he entered apprenticeship as a carpenter. Walton was a studious young man, but his uncle actively discouraged all study and believed a studious boy to be an idle one. Walton continued studying, and once his apprenticeship had ended, moved to Savannah, Georgia, in 1769 to study law under a Mr. Young and was admitted to the bar in 1774. His brother was John Walton. By the end of the American Revolution, he had become one of the most successful lawyers in Georgia.

== American Revolution ==
He became an advocate of the Patriot cause, was elected secretary of the Georgia Provincial Congress, and became president of the Council of Safety. In 1776, he served as a delegate to the Second Continental Congress in Philadelphia, a position that he held until the end of 1778. On July 2, 1776, he voted in favor of the Declaration of Independence for Georgia, along with Button Gwinnett and Lyman Hall.

During the American Revolutionary War, he was in the battalion of General Robert Howe. On January 9, 1778, Walton received a commission as colonel of the First Georgia Regiment of Militia. During the Battle of Savannah in 1778, Walton was injured in the battle and taken prisoner. He was hit in the thigh by a musket ball that threw him from his horse. He was subsequently captured by the British, who allowed his wound to heal before sending him to Sunbury Prison, where other colonial prisoners were held. Walton was released under a prisoner exchange in October 1779.

In October 1779, Walton was elected governor of Georgia for the first time, a position that he held for only two months.

== Later life ==
In November 1795, he was appointed to the US Senate to fill the vacancy caused by the resignation of James Jackson. Walton served in that position from November 16, 1795, to February 20, 1796, when a successor, Josiah Tattnall, was officially elected. He was a political ally of Scottish General Lachlan McIntosh and a foe of Button Gwinnett. He and Gwinnett had political battles that resulted in his expulsion from office and indictment for various criminal activities. He was later censured for his support of a duel that resulted in Gwinnett's death by McIntosh.

Walton was for the Yazoo land sales, the massive real estate fraud perpetrated in the mid-1790s by Georgia Governor George Mathews and the Georgia General Assembly. The scandal brought Jackson home from the US Senate to lead a reform movement. Appointed to fill the vacant seat, a feud erupted between Jackson and Walton over the sale of land to speculators. Jackson won, and Walton left the office.

In 1788, Alexander McGillivray and other Creek Indian leaders met with Georgia leaders at Rock Landing, but the meeting failed to result in a peace treaty. That led Governor Walton to worry that "our prospects of peace have been obliged to yield to the impressions of war." Walton wrote to Colonel Jared Irwin and expressed both his concern and his surprise at the recent Indian depredations near the Oconee River. A treaty was not signed at Rock Landing, but eventually, the Treaty of New York (1790) ceded Creek lands to the state of Georgia.

During the 1780s, Walton devoted himself almost exclusively to Georgia state politics. He served as chief justice, commissioner to negotiate a treaty with the Cherokee in 1783, member of the Augusta Board of Commissioners (1784 and 1785), and commissioner to settle the border dispute between South Carolina and Georgia in 1786. He was elected as a delegate to the Constitutional Convention in 1787, but he declined since his commitments at the state level occupied his time to the exclusion of all else. In 1789, he was a presidential elector and served at the state convention to adopt a new constitution. Walton was elected to a second term as governor in 1789 and served for one year. During his term, Georgians adopted the new Georgia Constitution, moved the capital to Augusta, and concentrated on settling the western frontier. After completing his tenure as governor, Walton served as a judge of the superior court from 1790 to his death. He also filled the unexpired term of James Jackson in the US Senate in 1795 to 1796. He was a founder and trustee of the Academy of Richmond County in Augusta and of Franklin College (now the University of Georgia) in Athens.

== Offices held ==
The offices he held were:

- Continental Congress (1776–1778)
- Colonel of the First Georgia Militia (1778)
- Governor of Georgia (1779–1780)
- U.S. Congress (1780–1781)
- Chief Justice of Georgia (1783–1789)
- Acting Governor of Georgia (1789–1790)
- U.S. Senator (1795–1796)

== Death and legacy ==
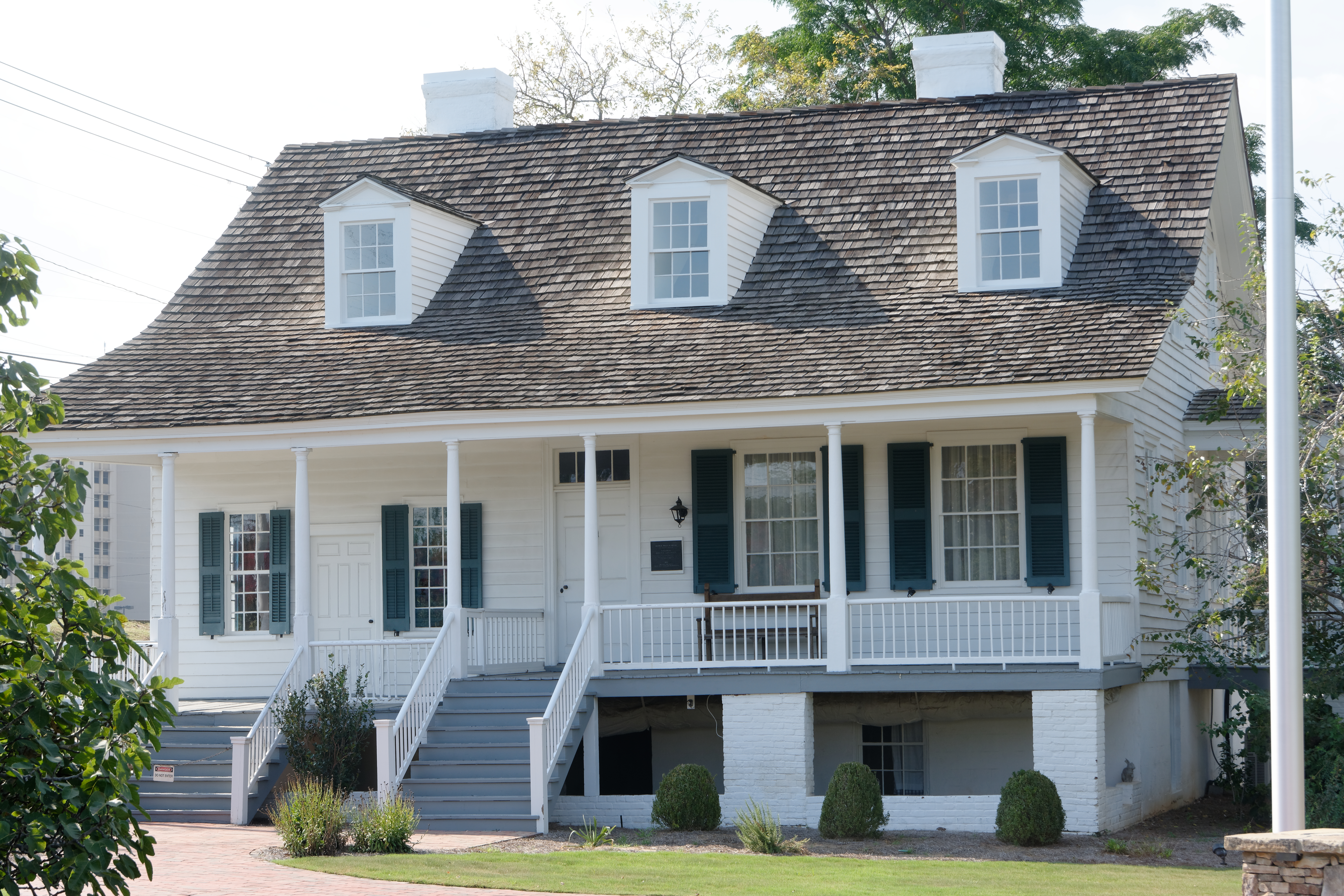
Meadow Garden

During his second term as governor, he built Meadow Garden, a cottage constructed on confiscated Tory land outside of Augusta, where he died. He was survived by his wife Dorothy, née Camber, whom he had married in 1775, and one of his two sons. He was initially buried at Rosney, home of his nephew Robert Watkins; he was re-interred in 1848 beneath the Signers Monument in front of the courthouse on Greene Street in Augusta. Even though Walton was from Georgia and Virginia, he did not own slaves and often advocated against slavery.

Walton County, Georgia, is named for him. There are also at least two schools that bear his name: George Walton Comprehensive High School in Marietta, Georgia, and George Walton Academy, a private school in Monroe, Georgia.

His son George Walton Jr. was the first secretary of the Territory of Florida. He was also the first civilian to serve in the role of governor of the territory, being named as acting governor until the arrival of William Duval. Walton County, Florida, is named for him. His granddaughter, Octavia Walton Le Vert, was a noted socialite and author. His great nephew Thomas George Walton built Creekside near Morganton, North Carolina.

== See also ==
- Memorial to the 56 Signers of the Declaration of Independence

== Notes ==
Political offices
Preceded by William Ewen	President of the Georgia Council of Safety; 1775–1776	Succeeded by William Ewen
Preceded by John Wereat	Governor of Georgia; 1779–1780	Succeeded by Richard Howly
Preceded by George Handley	Governor of Georgia; 1789–1790	Succeeded by Edward Telfair
U.S. Senate
Preceded by James Jackson	U.S. senator (Class 2) from Georgia; November 16, 1795 – February 20, 1796; Served alongside: James Gunn	Succeeded by Josiah Tattnall
