= George Handley (politician) =

American politician

18th Governor of Georgia
- In office January 26, 1788 – January 7, 1789
- Preceded by: George Mathews
- Succeeded by: George Walton

Personal details
- Born: George Handley; February 9, 1752 Sheffield, England
- Died: September 17, 1793 (aged 41)

Military service
- Allegiance: United States
- Branch/service: Continental Army
- Years of service: 1776–1784
- Rank: Captain
- Unit: 1st Georgia Battalion
- Battles/wars: American Revolutionary War (POW)

George Handley (February 9, 1752 – September 17, 1793) was an American politician who served as the 18th governor of Georgia from 1788 to 1789. George Handley was a member of the Society of the Cincinnati of the State of Georgia.

== Biography ==
Handley was born in Sheffield, England, in 1752 and moved to Savannah, Georgia, in 1775. During the American Revolutionary War, he served in the 1st Georgia Battalion of the Continental Army, rising to the rank of captain. He was taken prisoner at Augusta, Georgia, on September 18, 1780.

Handley served as the governor of Georgia from 1788 to 1789 and was instrumental in the drafting of Georgia's state constitution.

George Handley was a Freemason and member of Solomon's Lodge No. 1, F. & A. M. at Savannah, Georgia. Solomon's Lodge No. 1, F. & A. M. was established on February 21, 1734, by the renowned Freemason and founder of the Colony of Georgia James Edward Oglethorpe. Solomon's Lodge, No. 1, F. & A. M. is now the "Oldest Continuously Operating English Constituted Lodge of Freemasons in the Western Hemisphere".

Handley died near Rae's Hall Plantation near Savannah in 1793. His burial place is now unknown but is presumed to be in Savannah.

== See also ==
- List of United States governors born outside the United States

Political offices
Preceded by George Mathews	Governor of Georgia; 1788–1789	Succeeded by George Walton
